= Ferrara Charterhouse =

Former monastery in Ferrara, Italy

Coordinates: 44.8454°N 11.6268°E

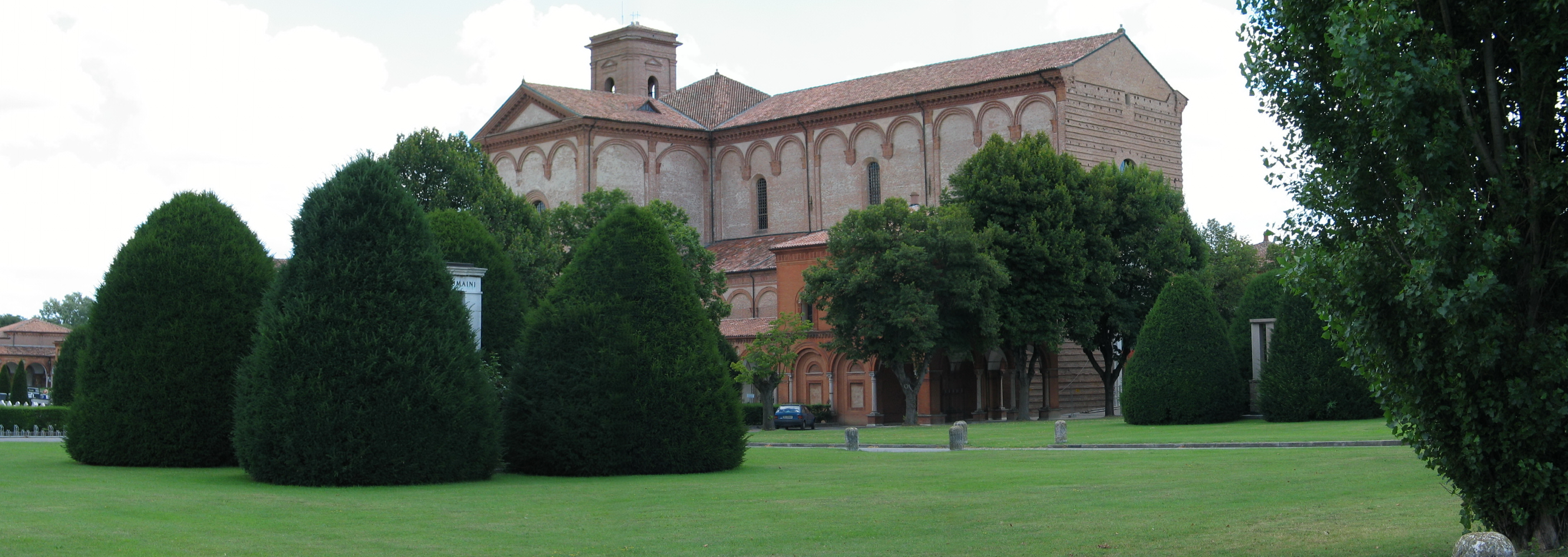
San Cristoforo alla Certosa, the former church of Ferrara Charterhouse

Ferrara Charterhouse (Italian: Certosa di Ferrara), of which the present Church of San Cristoforo alla Certosa was previously the monastic church, is a former charterhouse or Carthusian monastery built in Renaissance style, located on Piazza Borso 50 in Ferrara, Region of Emilia-Romagna, Italy. The monastery was suppressed in the time of Napoleon, but the church was reconsecrated in 1813 and remains in use. The site also accommodates a large municipal cemetery, which was established in 1813.

== History ==
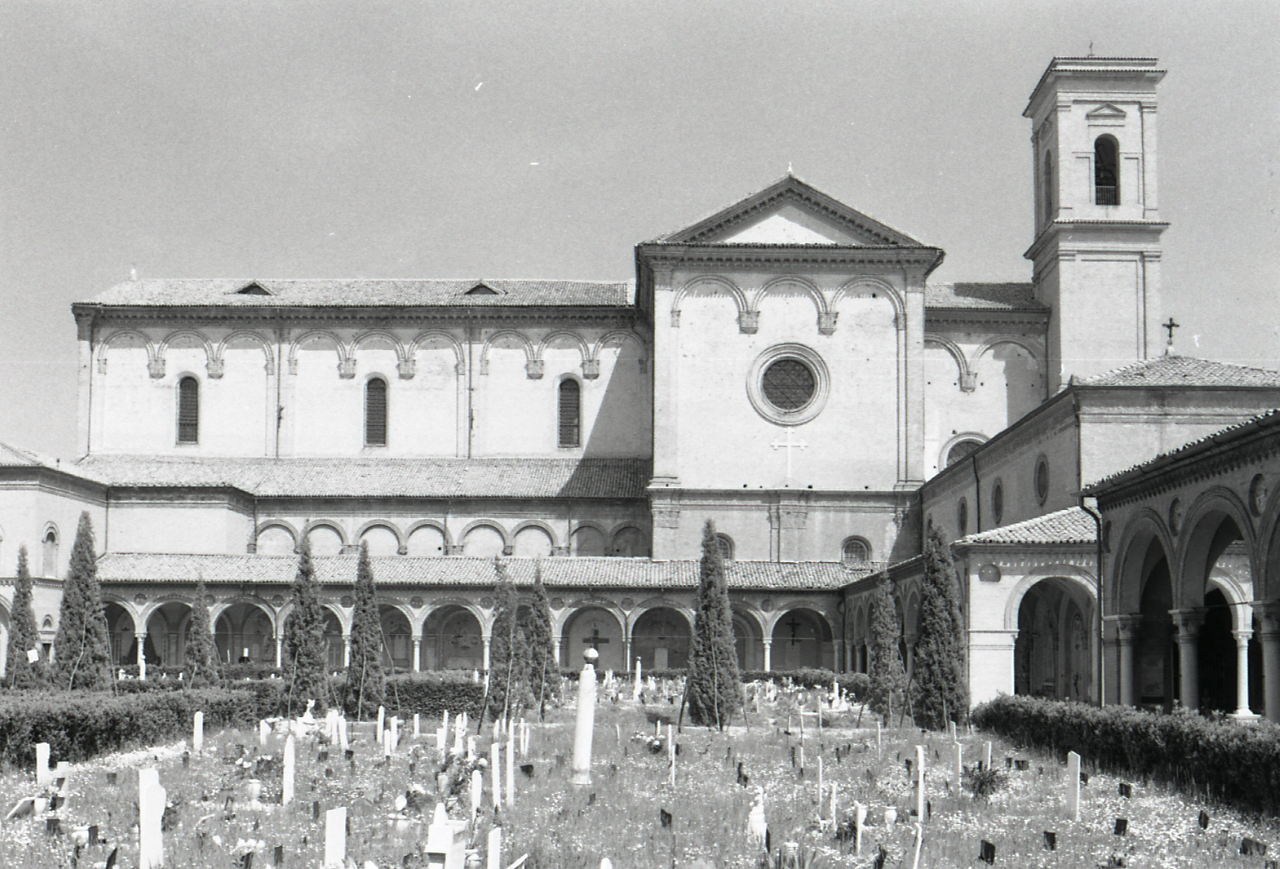
Church with the cemetery

In 1452, the Duke Borso d'Este sponsored the construction of a charterhouse (Italian: certosa) in Ferrara. As was the usual Carthusian practice, it was built outside the existing city walls, but ten years later new walls, the Addizione Erculea, brought it back within the city.

The present church, dedicated to Saint Christopher (San Cristoforo), was built in 1498, next to the original monastic church. The layout is that of a Latin cross with six lateral chapels. The project is attributed to Biagio Rossetti. The west front, which remains incomplete, was decorated in 1769 with a marble portal to the design of Gaetano Barbieri sculpted by Pietro Puttini, with angels by Francesco Zoppi. The side altars were decorated by Nicolò Roselli, and contained an altarpiece (1570) by Bastianino.

In the late 1700s, after the Napoleonic suppression, the monastery and church were closed and became the property of the city. The church was reconsecrated in 1813. The adjacent grounds, like those of Bologna Charterhouse, were converted for use as a municipal public cemetery (Cimitero Cittadino) by the architect Ferdinando Canonici, at which point the older church and part of the cloister were demolished. The grounds also contain a Jewish cemetery and a memorial statue to Leopoldo Cicognara by Antonio Canova.

Aerial bombing in 1944, during the Second World War, damaged the apse, choir, bell tower and south side of the church. The restorations were still incomplete, when the 2012 earthquake further damaged the foundations, limiting its use.

== Inventory in 1770 ==
The Napoleonic suppression of the monastery led to the dispersal of the works of movable art in the church and monastery. An inventory in 1770 lists the following:

The twelve chapels had canvases depicting the Passion of Christ by Roselli. The altar on the right of the crossing had a canvas with The Last Judgement with Sibyls by Sebastiano Filippi. This side of the crossing also had a St Jerome, copy of a work by Agostino Caracci for the Certosa of Bologna, copied by Francesco Naselli; a Blessed Niccolo Albergati, by an unknown Carthusian monk painter; and a St Bruno at Prayer in Squillace met by Roger I of Sicily by Ippolito Scarsellino. In the arches of the main chapel were two canvases depicting Carthusian Beati Stefano Macconi and Pietro Petroni (Blessed Monks) by Bononi.

The main altar tabernacle had paintings by Agostino Caracci. On the Baldacchino was a canvas by Francesco Ferrari. To the statuary of the main altar were works contributed by Pietro Turchi. The lateral canvases depicted the Virgin pleads with San Bruno and colleagues to return to the Hermitage and San Bruno before Roger I of Sicily by Giuseppe Avanzi. In the center, in the facade of the partition that separates the monk's choir, was a depiction of St Christopher by Sebastiano Filippi. Fillipi also painted a canvas next to the presbytery, depicting the Ascension of Christ. In the counter-facade were two holy bishops by Maurelio Scanavini.

The oratory next to the Presbytery had a St Bruno and fellow monks at Prayer and the Refectory had a Marriage at Cana (1622) by Bononi. The Prior's chapel had a Madonna and Child and St Bruno by the school of Guercino.

Other works in the monastery included paintings by the following:

- Giacomo Bambini: Last Supper
- Carlo Bononi: Madonna and Child in Glory with Cherubim, a Blessed Pietro Petronio (half-portrait) (by Leonello Bononi but retouched by Carlo), and a St Peter Apostle (Bust portrait)
- Lorenzo Costa: Pieta
- Dosso (attributed): Portrait of a Estense Princess, an Ark of Noah, a Madonna and Child with St Joseph and two other Saints
- Giovanni Battista Benvenuti (Ortolano Ferrarese): an Adoration of the Shepherd, an Adoration of the Magi, St Benedict, and a half-figure of Madonna and Child and another similar canvas with Holy Family with St Joseph; Ortolano also painted an arch lunette with the same topic.
- Sebastiano Filippi: Carthusian monk
- Garofalo (attributed): an Adoration of the Magi, a Visitation, a St Bruno, a Madonna and Child, and a St Jerome in Landscape
- Benedetto Gennari: St Paul
- Giuseppe Mazzuoli, (il Bastarolo): a St Francis before Crucifix
- Domenico Mona: Annunciation, a Christ Crucified with Sts Francis, Francis of Paola and Niccola, and a Madonna and Child (half-figures)
- Alessandro Naselli: Madonna and Child (half figure)
- Camillo Ricci: St Hyacinth of Poland
- Gabriello Rossi: facade of the cloister had a quadratura with columns and a fresco of St Bruno with Angels
- Scarsellino: Birth of the Virgin, Flagellation of Christ, and Madonna di Reggio
