= San Francesco, Ferrara =

Church in Emilia-Romagna, Italy

Coordinates: 44°50′2.33″N 11°37′30.36″E

San Francesco is a late-Renaissance, Roman Catholic minor basilica church located on via Terranuova in Ferrara, Emilia-Romagna, Italy.

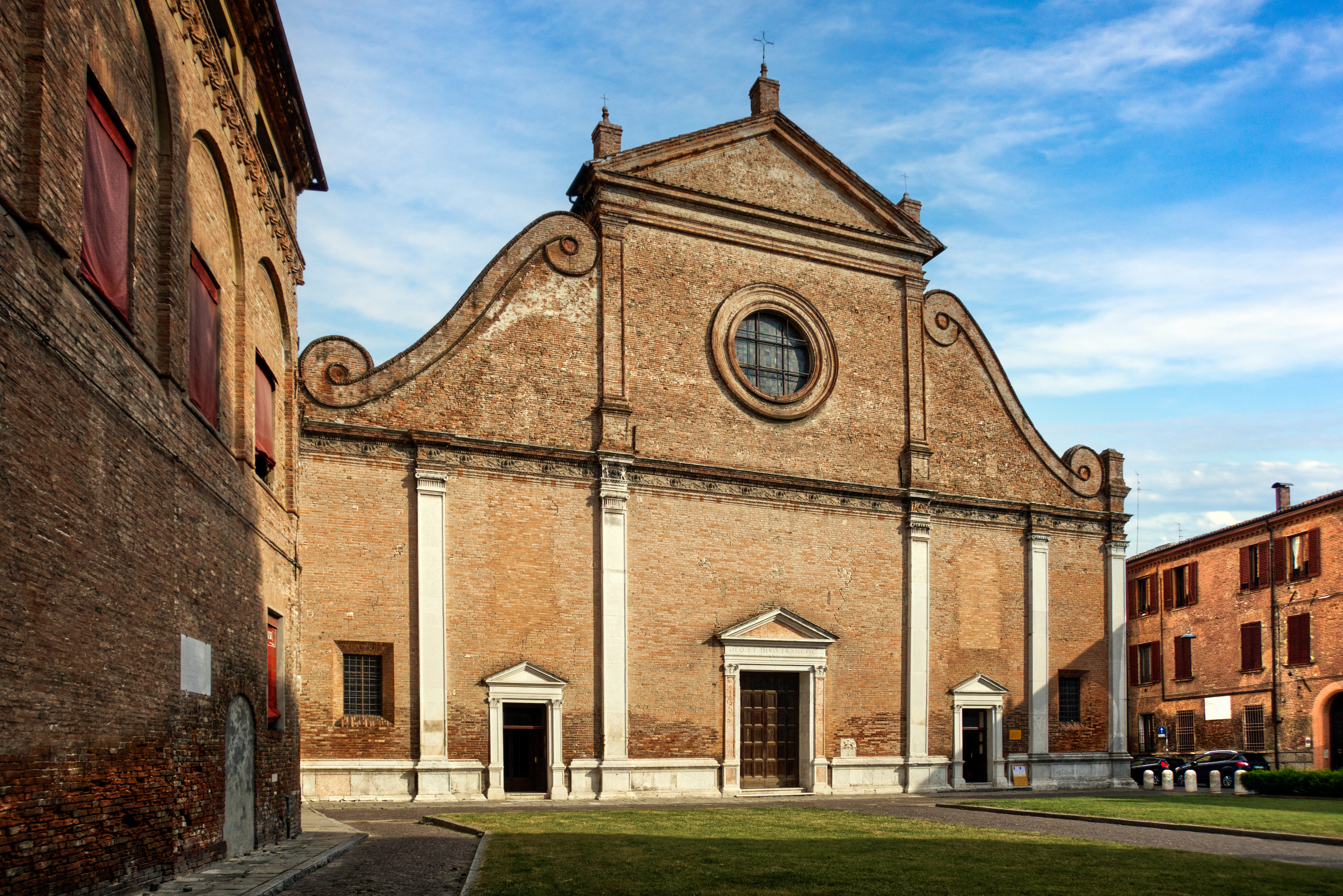
Facade of church

== History ==
A small Franciscan church and monastery was erected by 1232 at the site; but soon work began on a larger church. In 1341-1344 was built the present layout with a Gothic design is attributed to the masters Armanno, Taddeo and Falconetto da Fontana. Chapels were added over the next centuries.

During the Erculean Addition patronised by Ercole I d'Este, the church was reconstructed in a Renaissance-style by the architect Biagio Rossetti. In 1570, an earthquake razed the roof and collapsed part of the facade, and led to its present reconstruction. To the left of the brick facade were the Oratories of San Sebastiano and della Concezione. In 1864, the altarpieces depicting the Madonna del Pilastro and Child with St. Jerome, the Baptist, St. Anthony of Padua, another Saint, and Lodovica Trotti and the Resurrection of Lazarus (1532), both by Benvenuto Tisi (Garofalo) were moved to the civic museum. In 1957, Pope Pius XII elevated the church designation to a Minor Basilica. The earthquake of 2012 caused closure of the basilica.

In the 20th century, much of its artwork was moved to the Ferrara Pinacothek, and replaced by copies. Among the remaining works is the fresco of the Capture of Christ (1524) by Garofalo in the first chapel on left. The church still has the baroque cenotaph of marchese Ghiron Francesco Villa, a Ferrarese condottiero who, in 1668, led armies for Venice in the ill-fated defense of Candia against Ottoman armies. The memorial has a statue of the Marchese by Emanuel Tesauro and bas-reliefs depicting his feats as a general.

== Inventory of San Francesco in 1773 ==
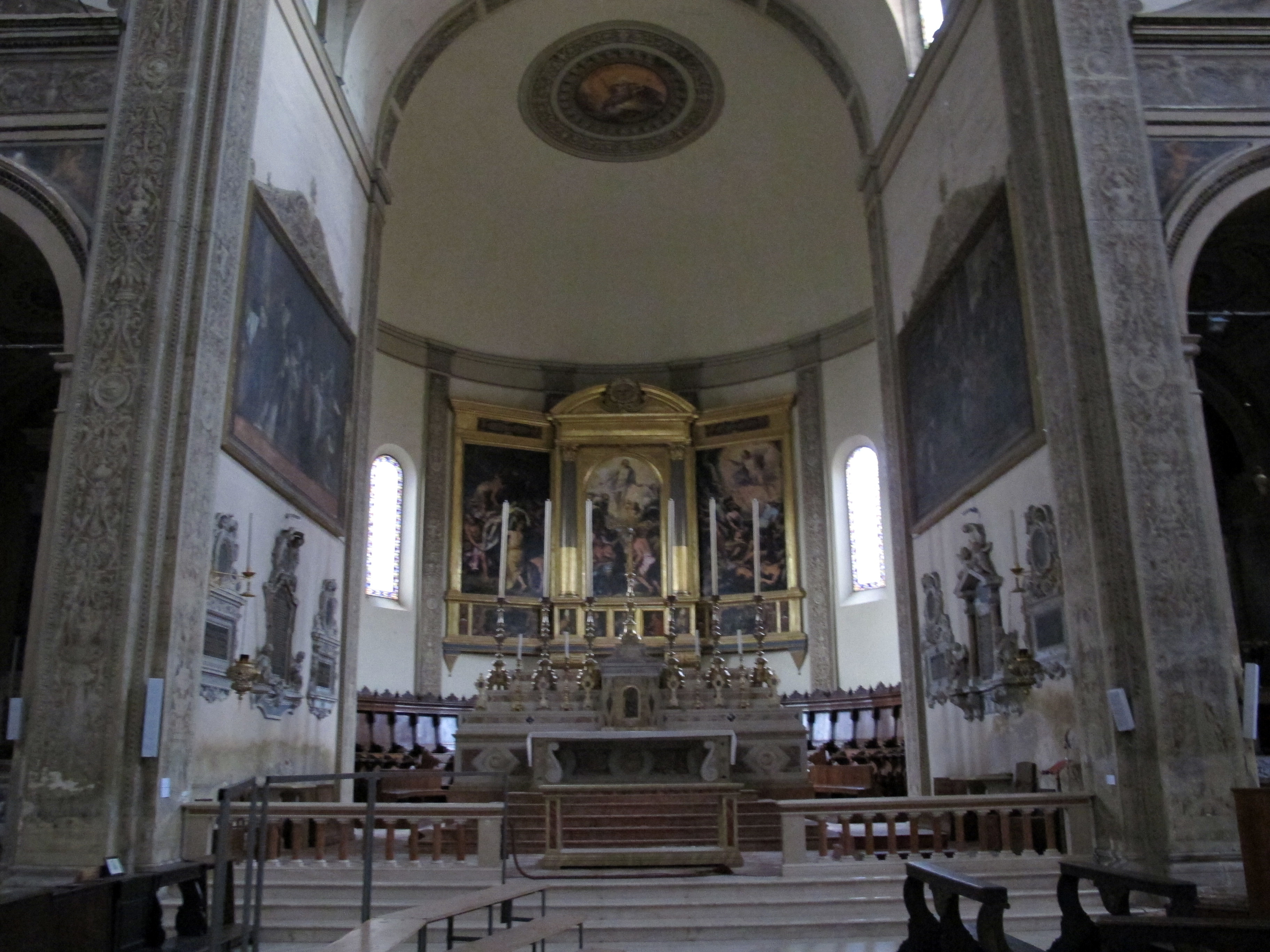
Apse with choir and main altar with three Mona canvases.

A guide to the city from 1773 chronicles the rich patrimony of San Francesco prior to the Napoleonic suppression.

The ceiling of the choir was frescoed by Francesco Ferrari. Three large canvases behind the main altar, a Deposition, Resurrection, and Assumption of Christ, were painted by Domenico Mona; below half-figures of Saints were painted by Niccolò Roselli. The chancel had two canvases flanking the altar, depicting a Virgin at the Temple and Christ among the Doctors by either Antonio Bonfanti or his brother.

The first chapel to the right of the nave held a stucco Immaculate Conception by Angiolo Pio with angels by Pietro Turchi. The next chapel belonged to the Rondinoli family. The following chapel had an image of the Blessed Andrea Conti by Giuseppe Alemani.

Below the organ at the choir, was an altar of the Novari family with a Saint Jerome attributed to Tomaso Laureatti and a Saint Francis attributed to Garofalo. The door entering had an Altar of the Assumption of the Virgin painted by Carpi, copied by Scarsellino. The original was taken to Rome. Adjacent walls had canvases of Saint Francis and various saints by Gabrielle Capellini, and an Ascent of Christ attributed to Niccolò Roselli.

The interior organ panels depicted an Annunciation, and Saint Francis by Ortolano; the outside panels, an Angel of the Annunciation and Saint Anthony of Padua by Giacomo Griego. The parapet before the organ a David and half figures of Saint Francis and Anthony attributed to Garofalo; other saints by Bononi.

The first chapel (Montachiese family) of the nave had an altarpiece of the Burial of Christ, attributed to either the Flemish Arrigo Clochero or the Milanese Ambrogio Fighini. It was flanked by a Saint John Evangelist by followers of Dossi, and a Saint Luke, a copy of a Pordenone work by Giuseppe Cremonesi.

The next chapel had a Virgin with Saint Elizabeth Queen of Hungary and Blessed Solomea by Giovanni Braccioli; the wall has an Annuciation by Francesco Naselli, and a Coronation of the Virgin by Scarsellino.

The next chapel houses a Holy Family by Ortolano; a God the father above by Garofalo, on walls; a Marriage of the Virgin by Leonello Bononi; and a Holy family with Saint Joseph attributed to either a follower of Naselli or the Flemish Giovanni Vengembes.

The next chapel had an altarpiece of the Virgin with Saints John the Baptist, Sebastian, and Bonaventure by Giuseppe Mazzuoli, a Salvatori nella Cimazio by Carlo Bononi. The walls had a Saint Francis receiving stigmata from Jesus-child by Monio; a Last Supper by Dionigio Calvart, others by Giovanni Vengembes.

The Riminaldi chapel housed an altarpiece depicting Rest on Flight to Egypt by Garofalo. The walls had a relief of the Nativity by Pietro Turchi. The next chapel (Bonacossi) had a Byzantine icon, the Virgin of Saint Luke. The parapet of the altar had an image of the Blessed Giovanni da Tossignano attributed to Garofolo. The marble pulpit was sculpted in 1623 by the Codegori family.

The Trotti chapel had an altarpiece of the Enthroned Virgin and Child with Saints John the Baptist, Bonaventure, and Jerome by Garofolo, flanked by two old panels with San Fiorentino, Sant' Antonino Martiri, and a third with Saint Bernardino by Cosimo Tura.

The last chapel clockwise (first on left, the Argenti chapel) had a marble altar with a Christ in Gesthemane, attributed to Girolamo Lombardi, Ferrara and God the Father by Garofalo, along with the still present Capture of Christ in the Garden.

The nave and counter facade were frescoed by Giuseppe Filippi. The statues of Saint Francis and Saint Anthony in the facade niches are by Antonio Magni.

The second chapel of the right nave (Lombardini) had an Addolorata statue attributed to the studio of the Lombardi. The third chapel had a Virgin with Franciscan Saints, San Carlo and a Holy Bishop by Francesco Parolini. The fourth chapel had a Massacre of the Innocents attributed to Guercino, and below were the Adoration of the Magi, Circumcision, and the Repose in Egypt with an oval depicting Flight to Egypt, all attributed to Garofalo; statues of Hosea and Jeremiah sculpted by Andrea Ferreri.

The next chapel had an icon of San Francesco di Paola by Domenico Monio, and an oval with saints by Giovanni Battista Cozza, with laterals depicting Saint Francis of Assisi and Saint Anthony of Padua, both in prayer, and both by Monio.

In the Chapel of San Francesco was a terracotta statue by Lorenzo Gheri, a Saint Francis lulled to sleep by Angel with Viola, and Saint Francis in ecstasy by Giuseppe Mazzoni.

In the next chapel, dedicated to Saint Caterina Vegri, a canvas depicted the Saint receiving the Child Jesus from the Virgin, by Giovanni Battista Cozza, in an oval was the Holy Family with Saint Anne also by Cozza. The altar was decorated by Giuseppe Filippi.

The nearby chapel of Saint Anthony of Padua. It had a copy of a fresco in the Basilica of Padua. Flanking this were two canvases depicting Miracles of the Saint by Carlo Bononi. There was also a painting by il Fiammingo .

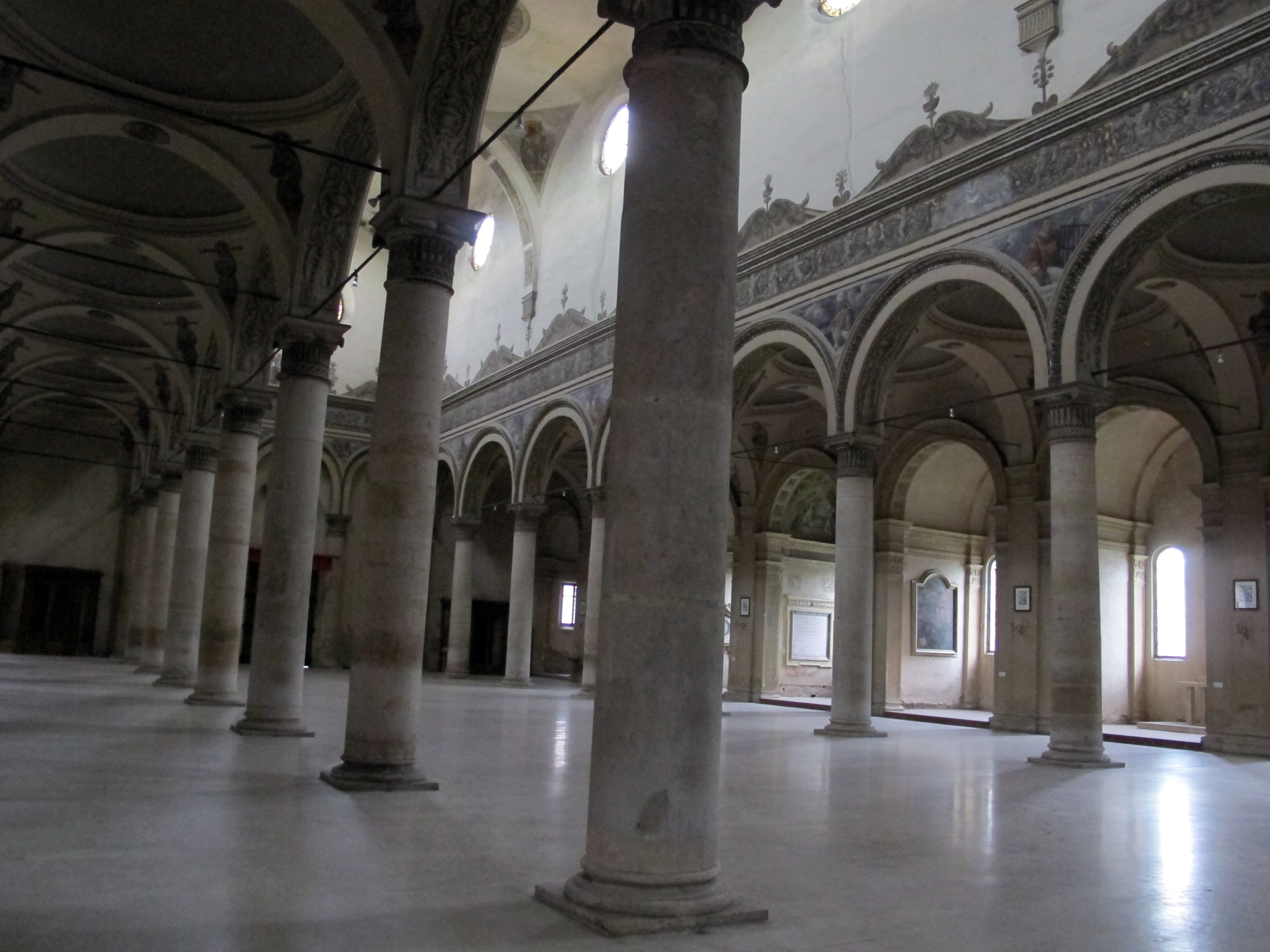
Nave of church.

In the nave crossing, the cenotaph of Marchese Ghiron Francesco Villa had a nearby Visitation by Domenico Panetti. The memorial has reliefs of his battles.

The first altar near the portal of the church has a canvas with Virgin and Saints and a Donor with God the Father, attributed to Camillo Filippi.

The nearby altarpiece depicted Dominican Saints and Donor Couple attributed to Camillo Filippi. The counterfacade was painted by Giuseppe Filippi; ovals with the virtues of Patience and Humility were painted by Giuseppe Ghedini.

The next chapel (Romei chapel) had a Repose in Egypt by Scarsellino. The next chapel has a Rapture of San Giuseppe da Copertino before Cross by Giuseppe Mazzoni. The side walls of the chapel were frescoed with the Miracles of the Saint by Girolamo Gregori.

The chapel of the Ciborium held an altarpiece with a Resurrection of Lazarus by Garofalo; while below the windows are Jesus at Gesthemane and Descent to Limbo by Andrea Bulzoni.

In the Vicenzi Chapel once hung four Flemish-style tapestries, woven in Ferrara to designs of either Dossi or Pordenone, depicting the Life and Death of Saint Francis.

In the sacristy were two large canvases, once in the first chapel, by Monio, depicting the Presentation of the Virgin and Annunciation with a God the father and Christ in Heaven with Angels above, Saint Francis and Bonaventure below by the Franciscan Agostino Righini.

The refectory had a crucifix and a Moses brings water from the Rock painted by Costanzo Cattanio and a Marriage of Cana by il Fiammingo. The second choir next to the Refectory had three lunettes depicting the Birth, Life, and Death of Saint Francis by Pomarancio. Among the relics of the church, brought from the Holy Land were putatively the desiccated bodies of two of the innocent children murdered by Herod and wood from the Holy Cross. The church also had the skulls of Saint Calixtus, Pope and Martyr, and of Saint Ippolito, Martyr.

The adjacent Novitiate had a terracotta statue of Vigilance at the foot of the staircase. In the dormitory was a wooden statue of Saint Giuseppe da Copertine by Andrea Ferreri. An adjacent oratory had a single altar with a Virgin and child and Saints Francis and Anthony by Sebastiano Filippi.

In the church the Estense family was buried in the Arca Rossa, so named because it was made in red marble. Here were buried the rulers from Marchese Azzo IX to Alberto III and wives. On the ground, near entrance was an inscription shield with the eagle. Costanza, wife of Malatesta, was buried here in 1392. The last burial in this tomb was Niccolò di Leonello, called Véla, decapitated in 1476 for having invaded the Duchy under Duke Ercole I d'Este.

A windowless room near the street in the convent putatively housed Saint Antony of Padua and Saint Bernardino of Siena, was also used to imprison rebellious members of Este family. Saint Bernardino had preached in town against vanity and long trains in women's dresses and fled after being made bishop of Ferrara.

== Inventory from 1851 ==
A guide in 1835 noted that the best pictures had been moved to the Pinacoteca Comunale, and that the structural foundations of the church were in poor state.

The frieze of the main nave was stuccoed by Girolamo Sellari of Carpi, restored in part by Luigi Pedrali and Girolamo Domenichini. Tommaso Sellari, the father of Girolamo, completed some of the half-figures in the arches.

The organ was new and completed by the brothers Quintino and Cesare Rasori of Bologna.

At the fourth altar on the right was a copy by Giovanni Pagliarini of a Massacre of the Innocents by Garofalo.

The main altar of polychrome marble, had an image of the Virgin in precious stones and bronze, donated by Cardinal Bonifazio Bevilacqua. The altar was designed by Antonio Tosi. In the choir, Mona's three large canvases were still present. One altar in the nave had a Deposition from the Cross by Flemish artist. The last chapel has a Capture of Jesus in Gesthemane (1524) by Garofalo, flanked by portraits of prophets with two donors of the Massa family. In this era, it was recalled that this temple held the remains of the ill-fated lovers Ugo d'Este and Parisina Malatesta.
