= Santo Stefano, Ferrara =

Coordinates: 44.8362°N 11.6170°E

The church of Santo Stefano or San Stefano Protomartire is among the oldest in Ferrara, Italy. It is located on Piazetta Sant'Etienne, a few blocks west of the Ferrara Cathedral.

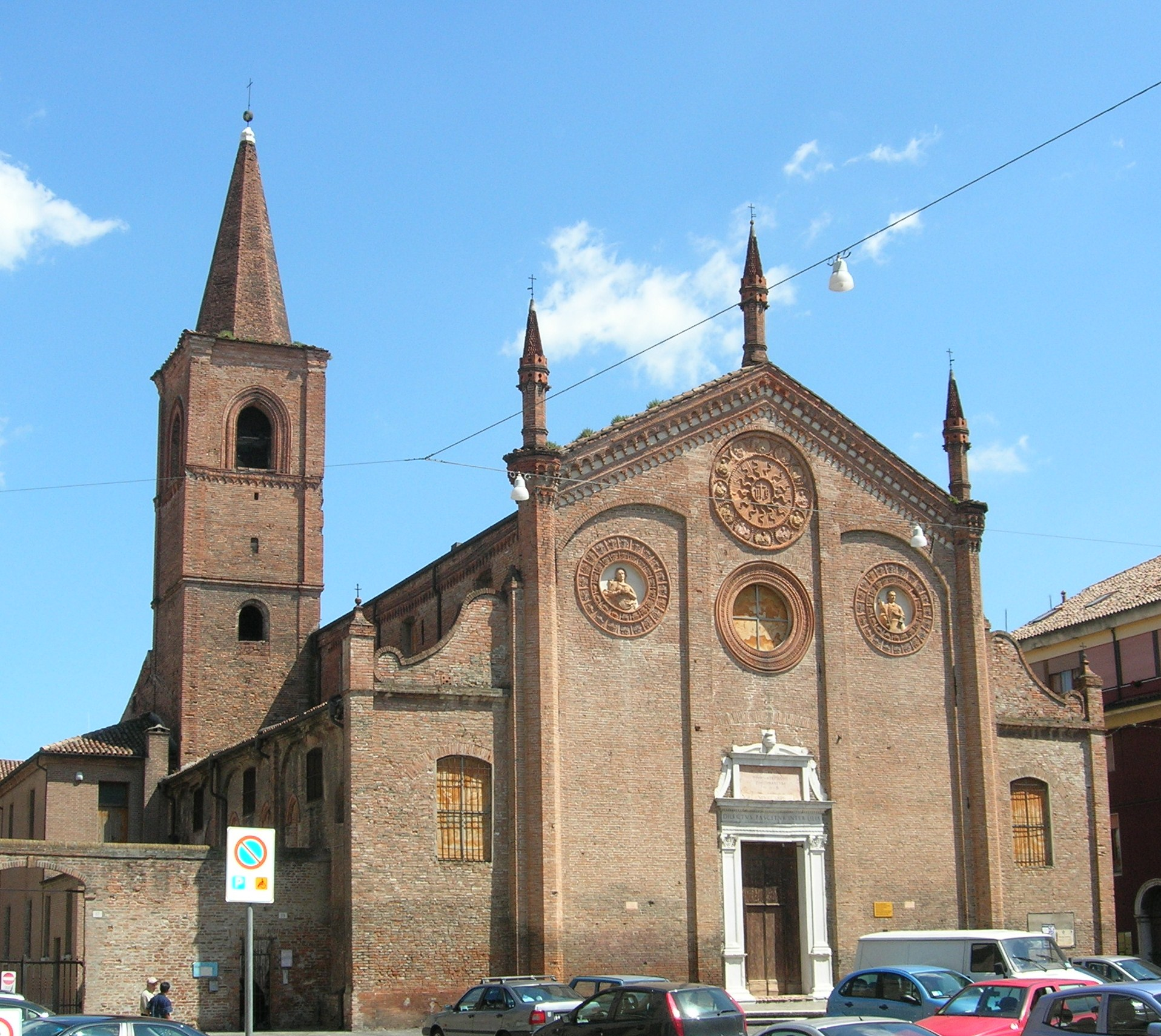
Facade of Santo Stefano.

== History ==
Founded about the year 960, the church has undergone a number of reconstructions. The Belltower, constructed in 1100, nearly collapsed in 1275. The earthquake of 1570 caused much damage. The present structure owes it structure to Biagio Rossetti. In 1657, the church was granted to the Congregation of the Oratory of San Filippo Neri. In 1796, the congregation was suppressed. Bombs in 1944 caused much damage to the ceiling frescoes (1882) by Francesco Ferrari. The portal in the church once belonged to the church of San Silvestro. The interior has altarpieces or work by Giacomo Parolini, Ippolito Scarsella, Carlo Bononi, Gaetano Gandolfi, Paganini, Giuseppe Avanzi, and Antonio Randa.
