= Bononi =

Bononi is a surname. Notable people with the surname include:

- Carlo Bononi (1569?–1632), Italian painter
- Lionello Bononi, Italian baroque period painter
- Bartolommeo Bononi (active 1491–1528), Italian renaissance painter
