= Giulio Cromer =

Italian painter

Giulio Cromer or Croma or Cremer (1572, Ferrara–1632) was a German-Italian painter of the Mannerist period, active for many years in Ferrara, Italy.

From an 1876 book:

Giulio Cromer, Carlo Bononi a pupil of Bastaruolo, and Alfonso Rivarola or Chenda, were the last artists of any eminence in Ferrara.

== Biography ==
Born in 1572, but While he was born in Silesia or to a German family in Ferrara, he trained in that city under Domenico Mona.

Known to have originally fled from a Silesian family, he was therefore given the nickname, the German – il Tedesco.

Jacopo Bambini was also a pupil of Mona. He died at Ferrara in 1632. In the latter city he painted a Preaching of St. Andrew. for the church dedicated to that saint; also 'The Calling of SS. Peter and Andrew.'
