= Chiesa dei Teatini, Ferrara =

Church and monastery in Emilia-Romagna, Italy

The Church of the Theatines (Teatini), also known as Santa Maria della Pietà, is a Roman Catholic, Baroque-style church and monastery located on Corso della Giovecca, in central Ferrara, region of Emilia-Romagna, Italy.

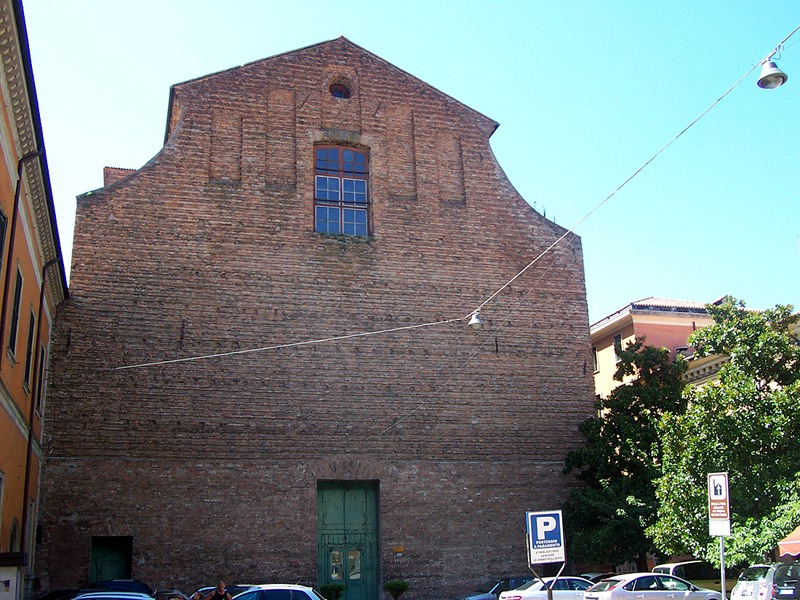
Facade

In 1618, prompted by Laura Sighizzi, along with Cardinal Carlo Emanuel Pio of Savoy bought a house in the neighborhood of Giovecca to open an oratory for the Theatine Order dedicated to the Madonna della Pieta. The architect Luca Danese was commissioned to design the church, which was completed in 1653 and decorated in Baroque fashion.

The facade remains incomplete in brick. The interiors are highly decorated according to an inventory from the late 18th century. In the choir were paintings depicting the Life of San Gaetano by Clemente Maiola. Maiola also frescoed angels in a ceiling for the chapel near the presbytery, which also has works by Scarsellino. The canvas depicting John the Baptist to the right of the main chapel was painted by Andrea Sacchi. The main chapel has a Mary at the Temple by Guercino. A Sant'Andrea Avellino was painted by Camillo Ricci. The ceiling of the sacristy is frescoed with a Glory of San Gaetano by Alessandro Naselli. In the first chapel is a San Gregorio Taumaturgo by Costanzo Cattanio. Another chapel has a San Gaetano and a Resurrection by Alfonso Rivarola known as il Chenda.

Among the columns and pilasters, are canvases depicting the Life of San Gaetano by Cesare Mezzogori. He also painted friezes of angels in chiaroscuro on the ceiling and canvases around the Altar of the Purification of the Virgin. The latter work was completed along with Giovanni Battista Felletti, who painted a San Gaetano and the Jesus Child.

Under the altar of St John the Baptist is the body of the San Secondino, Bishop and Martyr; and in chapel of the Virgin of the Graces, the relics of San Faustino Martire, both transported here supposedly from the Cemetery of Santa Lucina in Via Aurelia outside of Rome. The General Antonio Domenico Balbiani is buried in the last chapel. The general defended Ferrara for Pope Clement XI. He was named Grand Prior of Armenia and Grand Admiral of Malta.

The oratory of the Theatines adjacent to the church is also decorated with painted artworks. The main altarpiece was a Santissima Virgin by Costanzo Cattani. In the walls of the oratory were canvases depicting an Annunciation by Giovanni Braccioli; a Purification at the Temple by Camillo Setti; a Flight to Egypt by Alessandro Naselli, and others by Tommaso Capitanelli. The ceiling was painted by Francesco Ferrari.
