= Gregori (surname) =

Gregori or De Gregori is a surname. Notable people with the surname include:

- Damien Gregori, Irish musician
- Daniele Gregori (born 1977), Italian football player
- Diego Gregori (born 1995), Spanish football player
- Francesco De Gregori (born 1951), Italian singer-songwriter
- Gianluca Gregori, physicist
- Girolamo Gregori (1694–1773), Italian painter
- Hildebrand Gregori (1894–1985), Italian Benedictine monk
- José Gregori (1930–2023), Brazilian lawyer and politician
- Luigi Gregori (1819–1896), Italian artist
- Paul Gregori, French paralympic athlete
- Rio de Gregori (1919–1987), Swiss jazz pianist
- Sébastien Grégori (born 1981) is a French football player
