= Giuseppe Caletti =

Italian painter and engraver

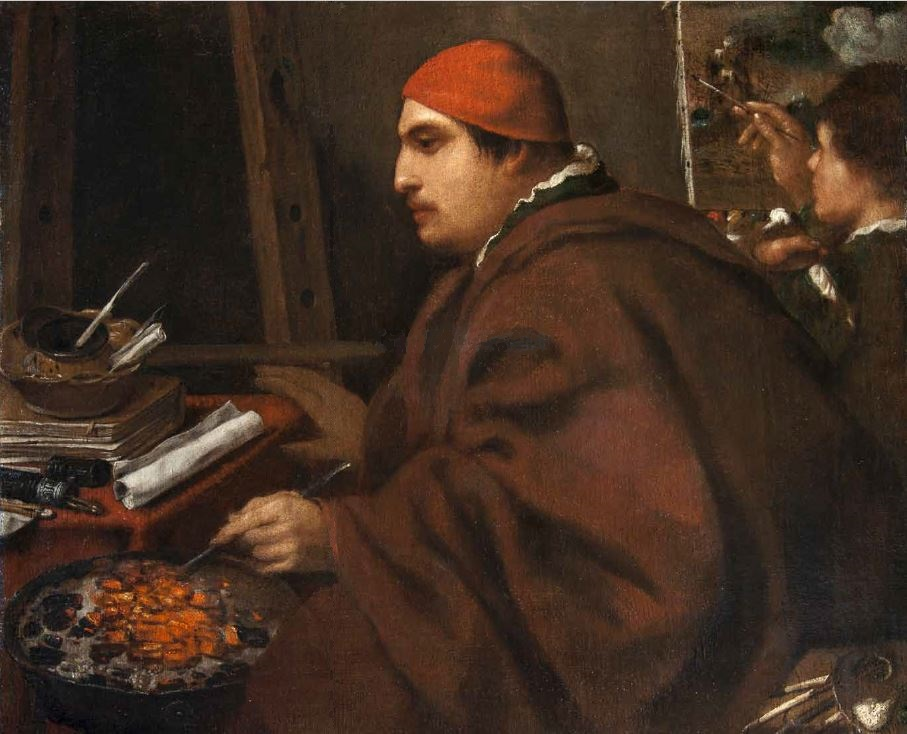
Self portrait of Giuseppe Caletti

Giuseppe Caletti or Calletti (1599-1641) was an Italian painter and engraver of the Baroque period, mainly active in Ferrara. He often painted religious themes in a genre like dress and surroundings, including the theme of Bacchanalia like Titian.

== Biography ==
Born in Isola Dovarese, near Cremona, where he was baptised on 9 February 1599, Giuseppe Caletti was also called il Cremonese. He is described by Camillo Laderchi as masterless, and of irregular life, always in trouble... disquieted, and untameable — although Cecilia Vicentini shows it is untrue. Like Dossi, the figures are generally smaller than life, and often placed in fantastic locales such as "wild boars in the sea, and dolphins in the forests". He painted the Four Doctors of the Church, and the Miracle of St. Mark, both for the church of San Benedetto at Ferrara. He engraved twenty-four plates characterized by a peculiar manner of treatment, consisting of the employment of bold parallel strokes without any cross-hatching. Among the more important of them are: David, whole-length, with the head of Goliath; David half-length, with the same.; Samson and Delilah; The Beheading of St John; St Roch kneeling; and Portraits of the Dukes of Ferrara.

His models have been variously listed as Guercino, Titian, and Dosso Dossi. He apparently befriended Antonio Randa, a Bolognese painter, but became involved in brawls and had to flee Bologna. Some of his works are found in churches of Ferrara, including the church of St. John the Baptist, where he collaborated with Francesco Naselli.
Caletti died in Ferrara on 22 September 1641.

== Gallery ==
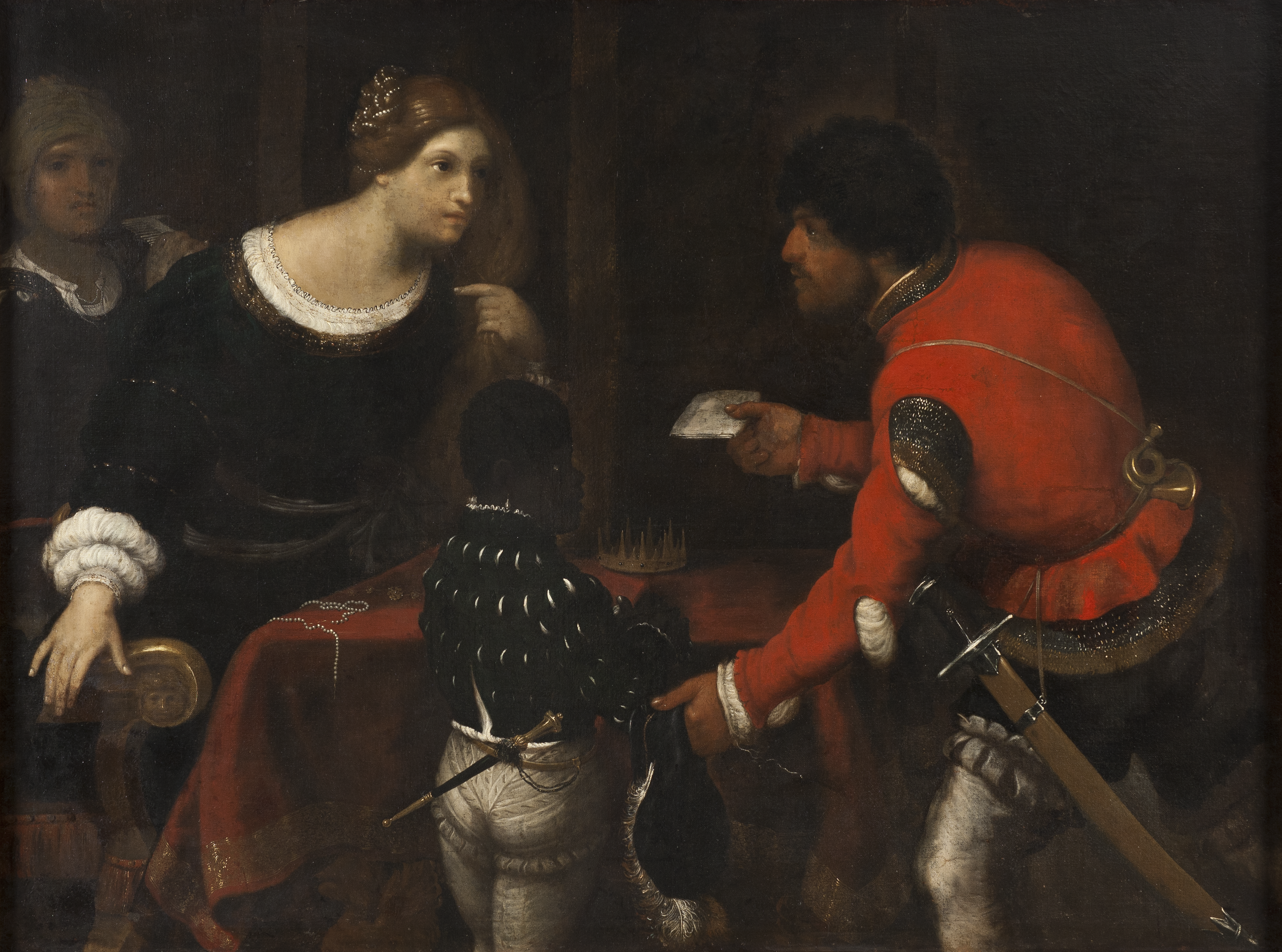
Caterina Cornaro, Queen of Cyprus, Receiving a Letter from the Venetian Council

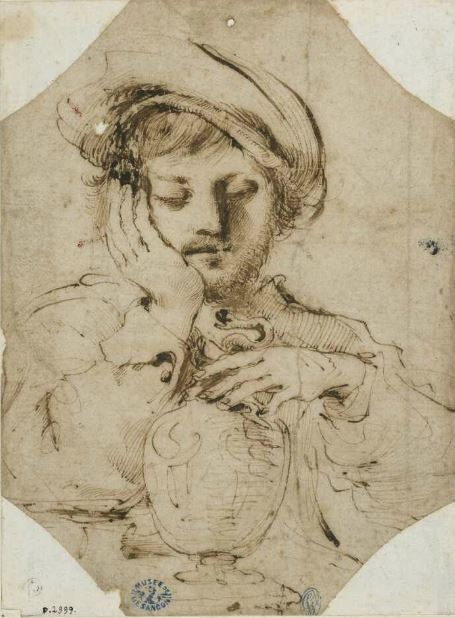
Man contemplating a vase from which appears a snake

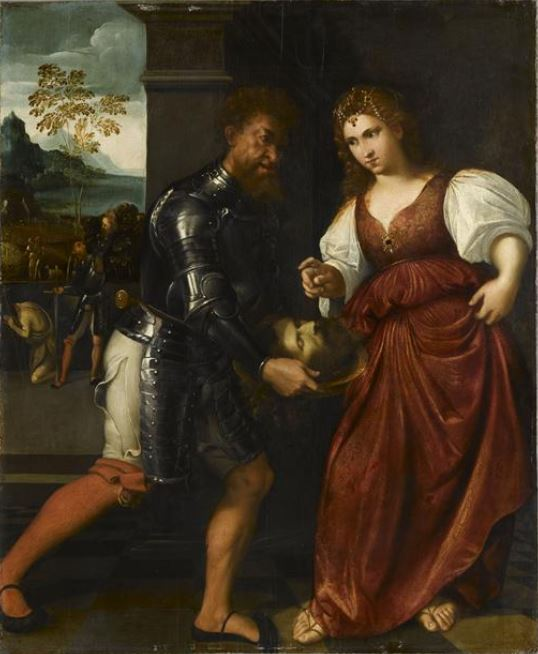
Salome receiving the head of St John the Baptist
