= Alfonso Rivarola =

Italian painter (1590–1640)

Alfonso Rivarola (1590 – January 8, 1640) was an Italian painter of the Baroque period, active mainly in Ferrara, where he was born. He is also known as il Chenda because of an inheritance he received from someone with that name.

From an 1876 book:

Giulio Cromer, Carlo Bononi a pupil of Bastaruolo, and Alfonso Rivarola or Chenda, were the last artists of any eminence in Ferrara.

== Biography ==
He was born to Francesco Rivarola and Giulia Panizza and baptised by June 1, 1590.

As a youth, he became a pupil of the painter Carlo Bononi. In Ferrara, he painted the Marriage of the Virgin in Santa Maria in Vado. He also painted for a San Nicola and a John the Baptist, and a ceiling canvas of the Baptism of St Augustine for Sant'Agostino (now lost); a St Cajetan prays before a Crucifix for the Church of the Theatines; a Destruction of the Brazen Serpent for the church of San Nicolò; and a Martyrdom of St Catherine for the church of San Guglielmo. He painted two canvases (Manna in Desert and Miracle of Loaves and Fish for the parish church of Quartesana. In the chapel of Saint Maria Maddalena de'Pazzi of the church of San Paolo, he painted a St Francis in Glory. He completed an unfinished canvas of Bononi depicting the Marriage of the Virgin for Santa Maria in Vado

He was also employed in the production of transient decorations for spectacles, festivities, and also the theater, and was employed in Ferrara by the Count Borso Bonacossi, and in Parma by the Duke. For example, in 1631, Borso celebrated a tournament in celebration of the marriage of Beatrice Estense Tassoni, daughter of the Marchese Ferrante, to Giovanni Francesco Sacchetti, brother of Cardinal Giulio Cesare Sacchetti, then legate of Ferrara. The tournament was held in the Sala dei Giganti, a hall in the Giardino Estense della Fontana. The theatrical presentation represented the story of Alcina the Sorceress, a Fisherman's Tale. In 1636, he worked for the Marchese Pio Enea degli Obizzi in a celebration held in the Prato della Valle in Padua. In 1638, again in Padua, he helped decorate a performance and tournament in the Hall of the Montartone Monastery.

In 1638, he helped with the creation of a theatrical tableau, a mixed metaphor of pagan and Catholic themes, set up in a piazza near the Palazzo de' Marchesi Bevilacqua in Ferrara; the occasion was the celebration Coronation of Mary, as the Virgin of the Rosary and the arrival of the new cardinal Ciriaco Rocci. At a cost of over 11,000 crowns, over 80 feet tall and 70 feet long, spouting fireworks, a column in the piazza was converted into a seven headed hydra with each head representing heretic notions of the Virgin Mary. The masque had a cloud descend with Archangel Gabriel, incinerating the hydra.

He died in Ferrara.

== Sources ==
- Farquhar, Maria (1855). Ralph Nicholson Wornum (ed.). Biographical catalogue of the principal Italian painters. London: Woodfall & Kinder. p. 45.
- Bryan, Michael (1889). Walter Armstrong; Robert Edmund Graves (eds.). Dictionary of Painters and Engravers, Biographical and Critical. Vol. II L-Z. London: George Bell and Sons. p. 388.
