= Bambini =

Bambini may refer to:

- Bambini, short movie by Francesco Maselli
- Giorgio Bambini, Italian boxer
- Jacopo Bambini, Italian painter
- Niccolò Bambini, Italian painter
- Another name for a Halo hat
