= Setti =

Setti is a surname. Notable people with the surname include:

- Camillo Setti, Italian Baroque painter
- Duilio Setti (1912–1972), Italian footballer
- Emanuela Setti Carraro (1950–1982), Italian nurse
- Ercole Setti, Italian Renaissance engraver
- Giulio Setti (1869–1938), Italian choral conductor
- Kilza Setti (born 1932), Brazilian ethnomusicologist, composer and pianist
- Maurizio Setti (born 1963), Italian businessman
- Sebastián Setti (born 1984), Argentine footballer

== See also ==
- Riccardo Levi-Setti (1927–2018), Italian physicist and paleontologist
