= Santa Maria Annunziata di Fossolo, Bologna =

Church in Bologna, Italy

Santa Maria Annunziata di Fossolo is an ancient Roman Catholic parish church in central Bologna, Italy.

Inscriptions in the church document the original consecration of a church at the site was in the year 1122. Tradition holds that the initial entry of Christianity into Bologna occurred near this site, where the now covered Savena canal was located. The church was rebuilt in 1500, after a fire destroyed the roof and cupola. In 1700, a further rebuilding added the present portico. More recent reconstructions occurred between 2007 and 2009, eliminating some of the additions to the original to the ancient church building. The main altarpiece is an 18th-century Annunciation by Giuseppe Varotti. The church has a number of works from the 16th and 17th centuries, including a cycle of the Via Crucis (1600s), a canvas with Saints Elias and Teresa of Avila, a canvas depicting a Crucifixion, and a sculpted wood Crucifix (1500). A chapel (1975) is dedicated to Pope John XXIII.
