= Saint Sebastian and the Angel =

Painting by Carlo Bononi

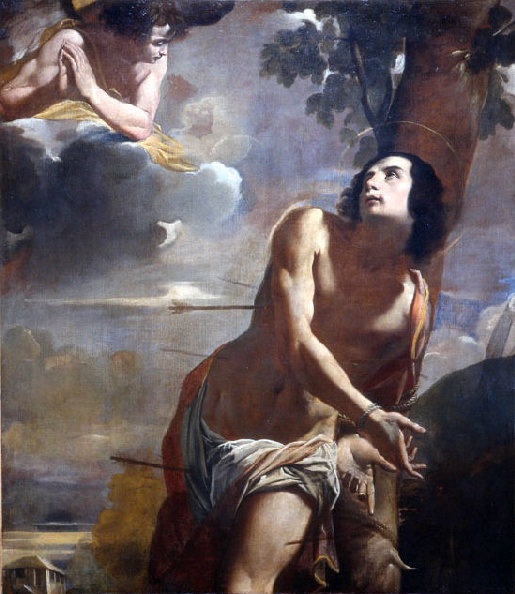
- Artist: Carlo Bononi
- Year: late 1620s
- Medium: oil painting on canvas
- Movement: Baroque painting Catholic art
- Subject: Saint Sebastian conversing with an angel
- Dimensions: 158 cm × 137 cm (62 in × 54 in)
- Location: Musée des Beaux-Arts, Strasbourg
- Accession: 1987

Saint Sebastian and the Angel is a late 1620s painting by the Italian artist from Ferrara, Carlo Bononi. The work is now in the Musée des Beaux-Arts of Strasbourg, France.

The unusual painting depicts a martyred Saint Sebastian in almost casual conversation (hand gestures included) with an angel resting on a cloud next to him. It had originally been painted for Ferrara's Oratorio di San Sebastiano, which was dissolved in 1772, and was cut down on all four sides before being sold to private collectors. The painting presents pictorial similarities with The Guardian Angel (Angelo custode), Bononi's acknowledged masterpiece in the Galleria Estense, and was probably painted at roughly the same time, i.e. towards the end of the 1620s. A slightly earlier painting of the martyred Saint Sebastian (c. 1622–1623, Reggio Emilia Cathedral) displays more conventional attitudes, and the influence of Guido Reni, less conspicuous in the Strasbourg version.

The painting was bought in Venice in November 1985 by the collectors Othon Kaufmann and François Schlageter, and presented to the museum in 1987. Its inventory number is 44.987.3.1.
