= Bombing of Ferrara in World War II =

Bombing of Ferrara
- Part of World War II
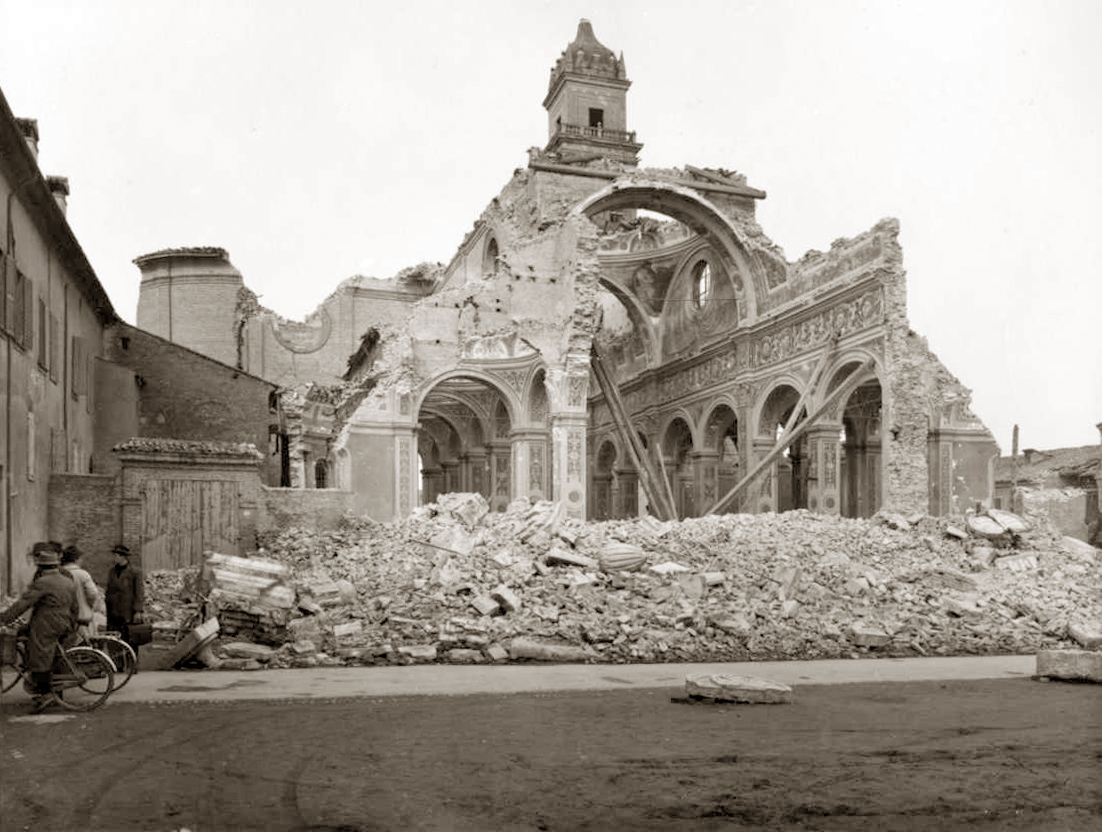
- The ruins of the 16th century church of San Benedetto after an air raid
Date	1943-1945
Location	Ferrara, Italy

Belligerents
United States; United Kingdom	Italian Social Republic

The bombing of Ferrara was a series of attacks by the United States Army Air Force and the Royal Air Force on the Italian city of Ferrara, Emilia-Romagna, during the final two years of World War II. The purpose of these raids was to disable the city's marshalling yard, but they also resulted in considerable collateral damage to the city itself, and over a thousand deaths among the population.

== Chronology of the main air raids ==
=== 29 December 1943 ===
First air raid on Ferrara: bombers of the 15th Air Force attacked the marshalling yard. A large part of the bombs, however, fell on the city, causing 312 victims among the population.

=== 28 January 1944 ===
Raid by the 15th Air Force, targeting the marshalling yard; the objective was hit, but many bombs fell on the city, destroying 140 homes, damaging another 600 and causing 202 dead and 172 wounded among the population.

=== 7 April 1944 ===
Raid by the 15th Air Force, targeting the marshalling yard; both the objective and the industrial districts were hit.

=== 25 April 1944 ===
Raid by the 15th U.S. Air Force, targeting the marshalling yard.

=== 12 May 1944 ===
Another raid by the 15th Air Force, targeting the marshalling yard.

=== 14 May 1944 ===
Another raid on the marshalling yard by the 15th U.S. Air Force.

=== 5 June 1944 ===
The 15th U.S. Air Force attacks once again the marshalling yard.

=== 10 June 1944 ===
Raid by the 15th U.S. Air Force, targeting the airfield.

=== 8 July 1944 ===
Raid by the 12th Air Force, targeting the marshalling yard.

=== 31 August 1944 ===
Night raid by the RAF: 74 bombers dropped their bombs on the marshalling yard.

=== 2 September 1944 ===
78 RAF bombers (two of which were shot down) attacked the marshalling yard.

=== 5 September 1944 ===
Another night raid by the RAF (62 bombers) against the marshalling yard.

=== 24 February 1945 ===
Raid by the 15th U.S. Air Force, targeting the marshalling yard.

== Damage and casualties ==
By the end of the war, 40% of all homes in Ferrara had been destroyed or damaged; most of the destruction occurred in the area surrounding the marshalling yard and in the newer districts, Giardino and Arianuova. The cultural heritage also suffered, with serious damage to the Palazzo dei Diamanti, the Palazzo Prosperi-Sacrati, the Cathedral, the churches of Gesù, Santa Maria in Vado, San Paolo and Santo Stefano; the Castello Estense was damaged as well, with the destruction of the northern ravelin. Industries also suffered damage; Ferrara's two large sugar factories were almost completely destroyed.

1,071 inhabitants of Ferrara, according to data of the local civil registry, lost their lives in the air raids.
