= Camillo Setti =

Italian painter

Camillo Setti (active 1675) was an Italian painter, active in a Baroque style mainly in his native Ferrara.

== Biography ==
He was a pupil of the painter Costanzo Cattaneo. Among his works are a Purification of the Virgin Mary for the Oratory of the Theatines; an Archangel St Michael for the choir of the parish church of St Michele; and a St Francis of Assisi for the church of San Nicola da Tolentino in Ferrara.
