= Giovanni Battista dalla Torre =

Italian painter

Giovanni Battista dalla Torre or Della Torre (1585–1641) was an Italian painter of the Baroque era. He was born in Rovigo but grew up in Ferrara. He trained under Carlo Bononi. He painted in the chapel of San Domenico in the church of the Franciscan Order. He painted in San Nicolo de Somaschi, in the apse over the choir. He also painted in Ferrara. He was murdered in Venice in 1631.

== Sources ==
- Bartoli, Francesco (1793). Le pitture, sculture ed architetture della città di Rovigo: con indici ed illustrazioni. Googlebooks. Pietro Savoni, Venice. pp. 313–314.
