= Camillo Berlinghieri =

Italian painter

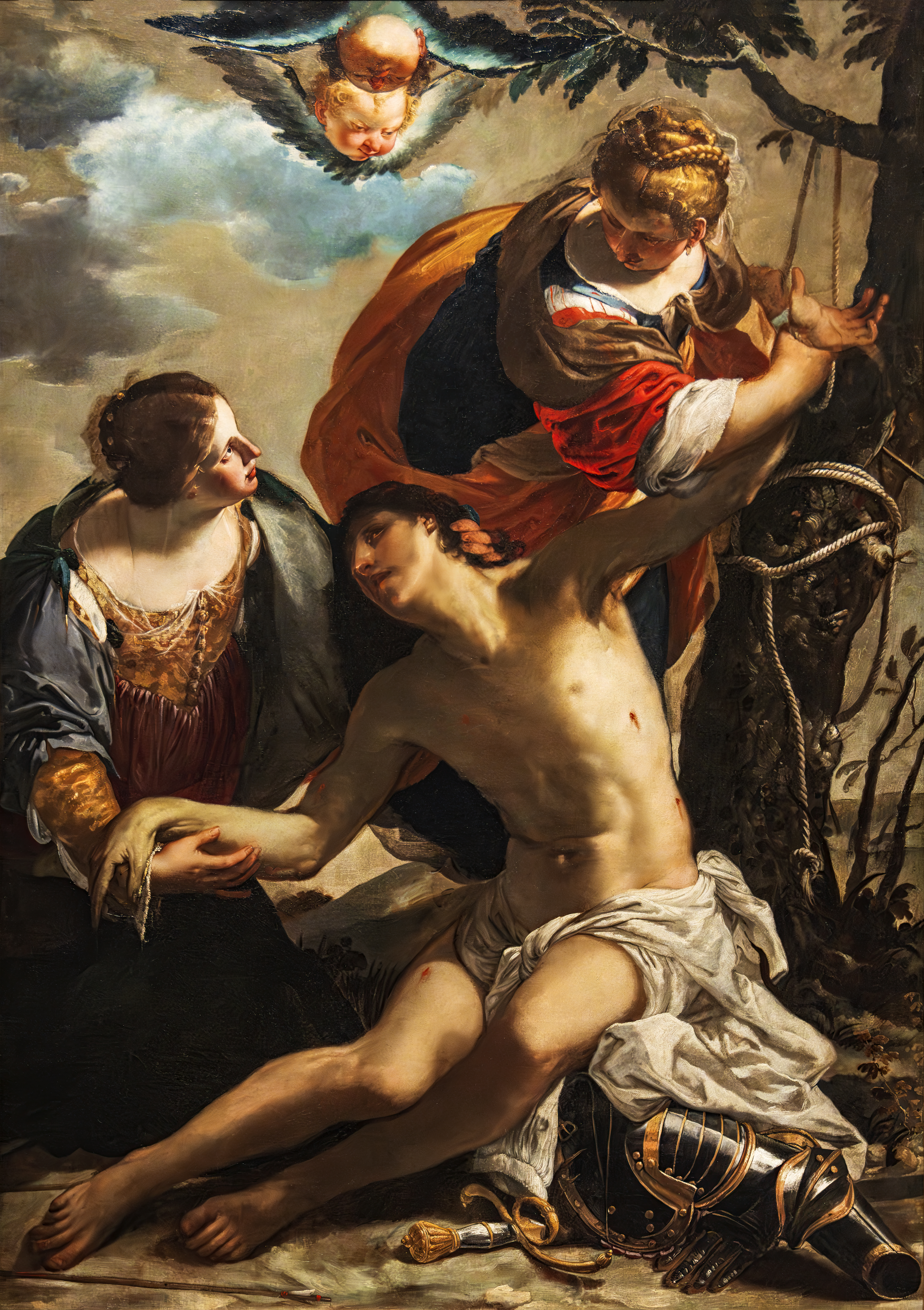
Saint Sebastian Tended by the Pious Women, Gallerie Accademia

Camillo Berlinghieri (1590 or 1605 – 1635) was an Italian painter of the Baroque period. Born in Ferrara. He trained with Carlo Bononi. Among his paintings was a Gathering of the Manna in San Niccolo; and an Annunciation for Sant Antonio Abbate in Ferrara. His works are chiefly at Ferrara and at Venice, where he was called Il Ferraresino. He died at Ferrara.
