= Alessandro Naselli =

Italian painter

Alessandro Naselli was an Italian painter, active in his native Ferrara in the mid to late 17th century. He was active in a late Mannerist style during the Baroque period. In addition to his tutelage of his father, the Ferrarese painter, Francesco Naselli, he was a pupil of Costanzo Cattani Some of his works can be seen in the Church of Theatines, Ferrara.

There is controversy about whether he is Francesco's son, since the Oxford Index states Alessandro's birth year as 1660, while Francesco died in 1630. Judging from the time of the decoration of the Church of the Theatines, it is likely that Alessandro was born in decades prior to 1630. The year 1660 may be the year of his death.
