= Rocca di Cave =

- Comune
- Comune di Rocca di Cave
- Location within Italy Location within Lazio
- Coordinates: 41°51′N 12°57′E
- Country: Italy
- Region: Lazio
- Metropolitan city: Rome (RM)

Government
  - Mayor: Gabriella Federici

Area
  - Total: 11.09 km^{2} (4.28 sq mi)
- Elevation: 933 m (3,061 ft)

Population (1 January 2016)
  - Total: 377
  - Density: 34.0/km^{2} (88.0/sq mi)
- Demonym: Roccheggiani
- Time zone: UTC+1 (CET)
  - Summer (DST): UTC+2 (CEST)
- Postal code: 00030
- Dialing code: 06
- Website: Official website

Rocca di Cave is a comune (municipality) in the Metropolitan City of Rome in the Italian region of Latium, located about 40 kilometres (25 miles) east of Rome.

It is home to the remains of the Colonna family's castle, which today houses a Geo-Palaeontological Museum and an astronomical observation point.
