= Antonio Bonfanti =

Italian painter

Antonio Bonfanti (active 1600) was an Italian painter. He was also called Il Torricella. He was a native of Ferrara, where he painted a Presentation of Mary at Temple and Dispute among Doctors for the chancel of the church of San Francesco and a Holy Family for the church of La Santissima Trinità. He was a pupil or follower of Guercino. His brother Giulio was also a painter.
