= Domenico Panetti =

Italian painter

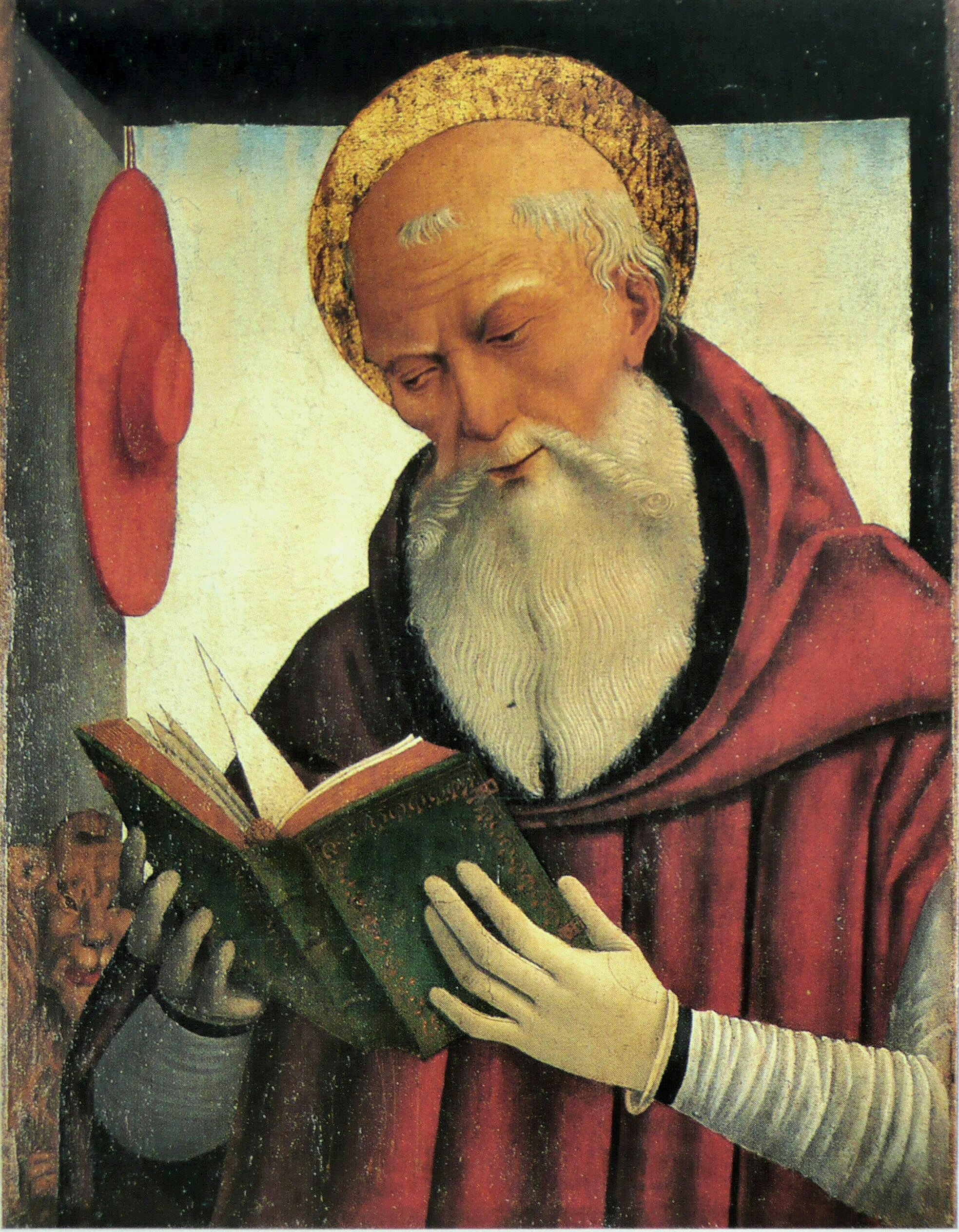
Saint Jerome, Museum Jacquemart-André, Chaalis Abbey

Domenico Panetti (1460–1530) was an Italian painter of the Renaissance period, active mainly in his native Ferrara. Among his early pupils was Garofalo. He painted a Deposition from the Cross for the church of San Niccolo and a Visitation for San Francesco in Ferrara.
