= Jacopo Alessandro Calvi =

Italian painter

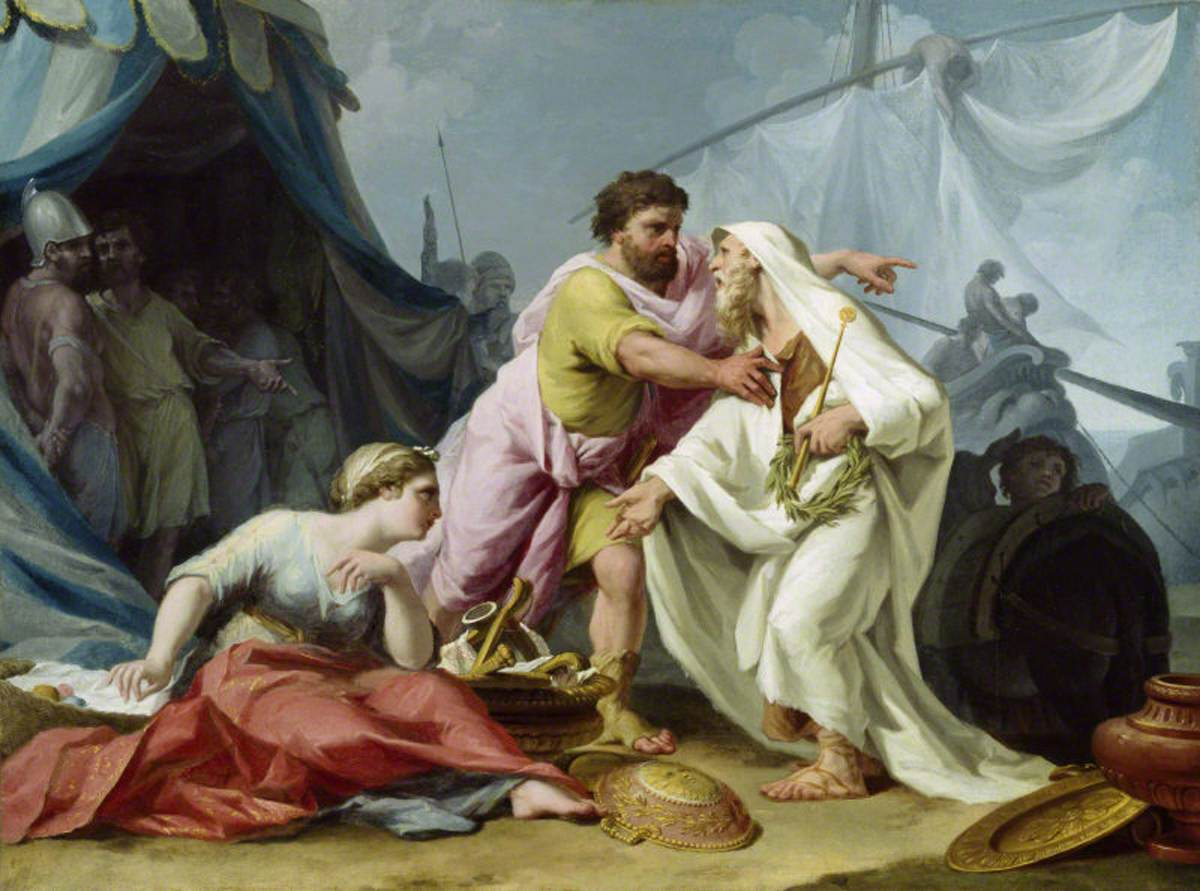
Chryses Vainly Soliciting the Return of Chryseis before the Tent of Agamemnon

Jacopo Alessandro Calvi (23 February 1740 – 15 May 1815) was an Italian painter and art critic who painted sacred and historical subjects in a late-Baroque style.

== Biography ==
He was born in Bologna. He became deaf at the age of eight years, and due to his short stature, he was nicknamed il Sordino. He trained with Giuseppe Varotti and later with Giampietro Cavazzoni Zanotti, from whom he also learned poetry. Among Calvi's writing are:

- Verses and Prose in quarto about a series of paintings owned by the Marquis Filippo Hercolani. Bologna 1780.
- La Certosa di Bologna descritta nelle sue pitture. Bologna 1793 by Luigi Crespi in 1772; with notes and corrections by Calvi.
- Notizie della vita e delle opere del Cav. Gian Francesco Barbieri, detto il Guercino da Cento. Bologna 1808.
- Memorie della vita e delle opere di Francesco Raibolini, detto il Francia. Bologna 1812.

Calvi painted in the cloister of the church of San Michele in Bosco and the Church of Sant'Agostino, Ferrara. Calvi also made engravings and was considered an excellent draughtsman. His best-known engravings were after frescoes by Ludovico Carracci in San Michele in Bosco, Bologna. The same frescoes were the subject of a study first published in 1776 by Zanotti, of which Calvi edited a second edition, eventually published in 1847. His literary pursuits are in fact of a certain art-historical interest. He published biographical studies of three Bolognese artists: Guercino, Mauro Antonio Tesi and Francesco Francia. There is also an unpublished manuscript by him on Ubaldo and Gaetano Gandolfi. Calvi died in Bologna on 23 February 1740. Anna Mignani was one of his pupils.
