= Girolamo Gregori =

Italian painter

Girolamo Gregori (Ferrara, 1694 – Ferrara, January 31, 1773) was an Italian painter, active in a late-Baroque style, mainly depicting religious and historic subjects.

== Biography ==
He was initially a pupil of Giacomo Parolini in Ferrara, but then moved to Bologna to work in the studio of Giovanni Gioseffo dal Sole. He was a close friend and collaborator of his fellow Ferrarese Giovanni Francesco Braccioli and Giuseppe Zolla.

He was very prolific in Ferrara. Among the works was a Holy Family with a young St John for the church of Ognissanti. He painted the chapel of the Church of San Domenico, he painted angels, and in the ceiling, a San Vincenzo Ferrerio, St Pius V, St Peter Martyr, St Thomas Aquinas, and San Cristoforo. He also painted in that church the figures in the Altar of Saint Pius, including a Genuflecting Pope with Saints and the Child Jesus. He also painted for the Sacristy and Refectory of the adjacent monastery. In the Rooms of the Inquisition, he painted figures for landscapes completed by Margherita, daughter of Giuseppe Zola. In the parish church of San Michele, he frescoed the ceiling. In the Chiesa Nuova, he painted three Archangels. In the Parish church of San Agnese, he painted two large canvases: Repose in Egypt and Angel comforts the dreaming St Joseph. In the chapel of St Joseph of Copertino, of the church of San Francesco, he painted two canvases with the miracles of the saint. For the church of San Bartolomeo, he painted two large ovals for the sacristy. He also painted in palaces in Mantua and Ravenna.
