= Sant'Agostino (church), Ferrara =

Italian parish church

Coordinates: 44°47′33.82″N 11°23′10.75″E

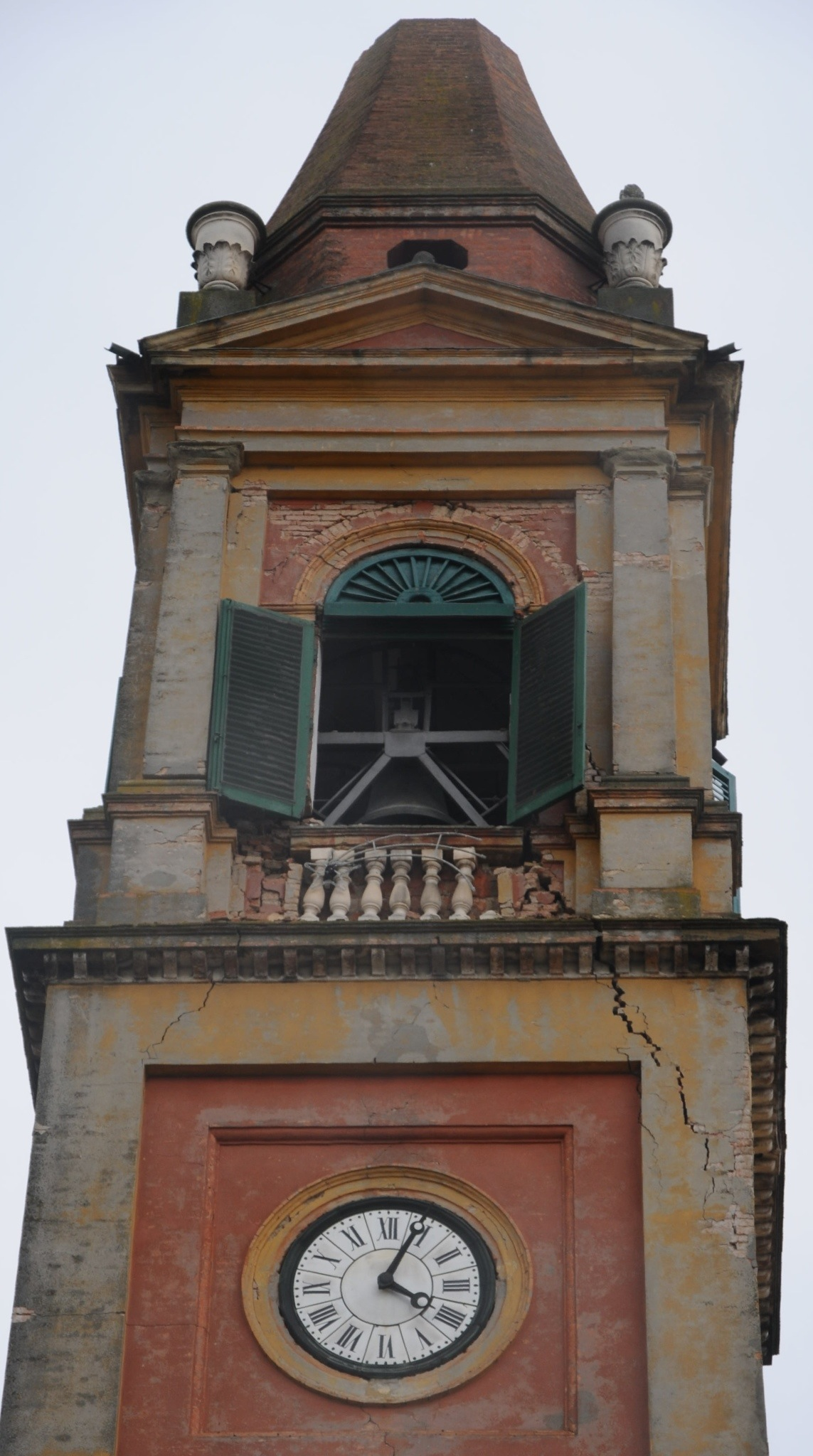
The belltower of the church

The Church of Sant'Agostino Parish is a Roman Catholic parish church in the frazione of Sant'Agostino, part of the comune (municipality) of Terre del Reno in the Province of Ferrara, Italy. The original church built in 1507 by commission from the Bianchetti family. By 1566, the church had its first reconstruction, and in 1626, the belltower was added; this was reconstructed in 1823. Just prior to becoming a parish church, the site had been part of the Oratorio dei Sacchi. In 1791–1792, the lateral naves were added and the nave elongated. The present Neoclassic facade dates to 1879.

The main altarpiece was once attributed to Fra Stefano da Carpi (1710-1796), but more recent documents point to Jacopo Calvi, also called il Sordino (1740-1815).
