= Giuseppe Varotti =

Italian painter

Giuseppe Varotti (Bologna, 1715- Bologna, 1780) was an Italian painter, active depicting sacred and historical subjects in a late-Baroque or Rococo style.

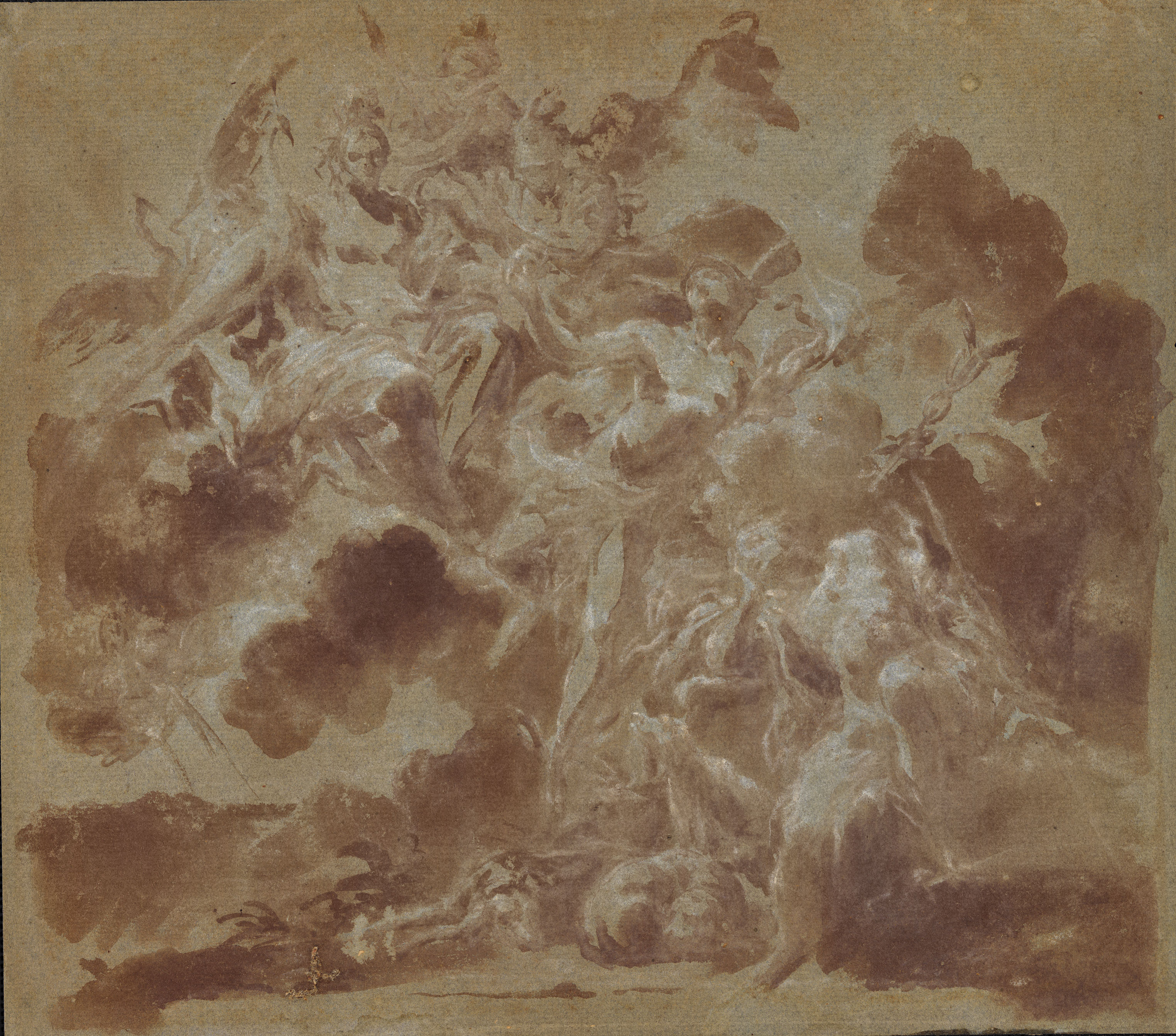
Mercury leads goddesses to the judgement of the Trojan prince, Paris

== Biography ==
He trained with his father, Pier Paolo Varotti (1686-1732), a follower of Giuseppe Maria Crespi. Giuseppe Varotti painted a St Roch once in the church of Santa Maria delle Grazie in Carpi. One of his pupils was Jacopo Alessandro Calvi (1740-1815).
