= Francesco Costanzo Catanio =

Italian Baroque painter

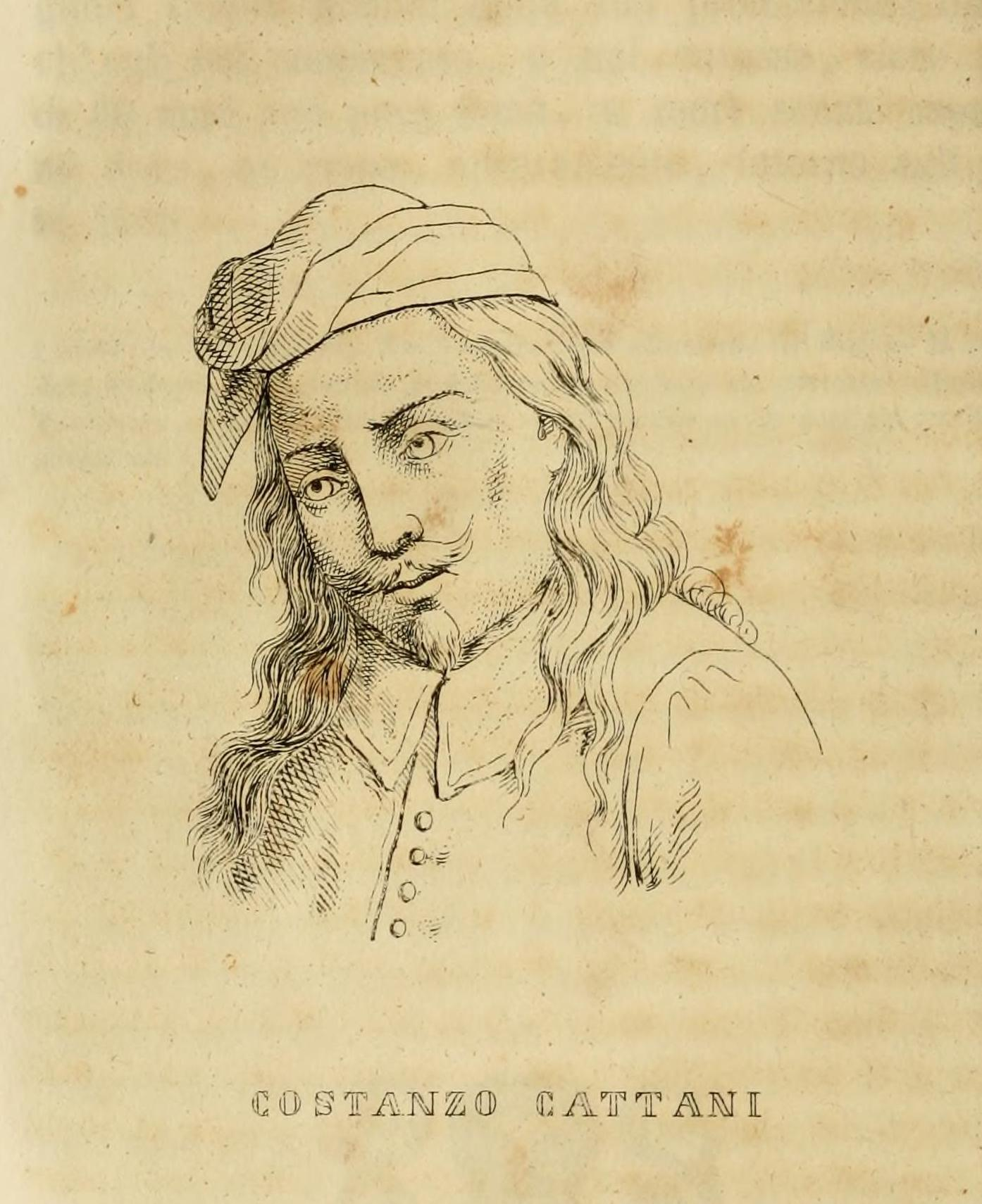
- Portrait engraving after a self-portrait (from Girolamo Baruffaldi, Vite de' pittori e scultori ferraresi, 1844 edition)
- Born: 1602; Ferrara
- Died: 3 July 1665 (aged 62–63); Ferrara
- Education: Ippolito Scarsellino; Guido Reni; Carlo Bononi

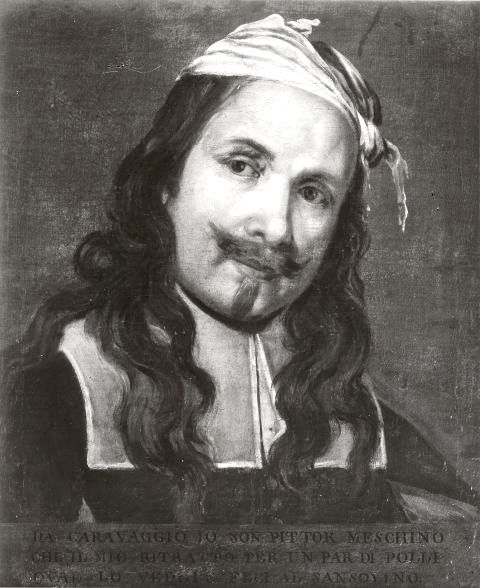
Self-portrait, formerly believed to be of Caravaggio; Szépmüvészeti Múzeum, Budapest, Hungary

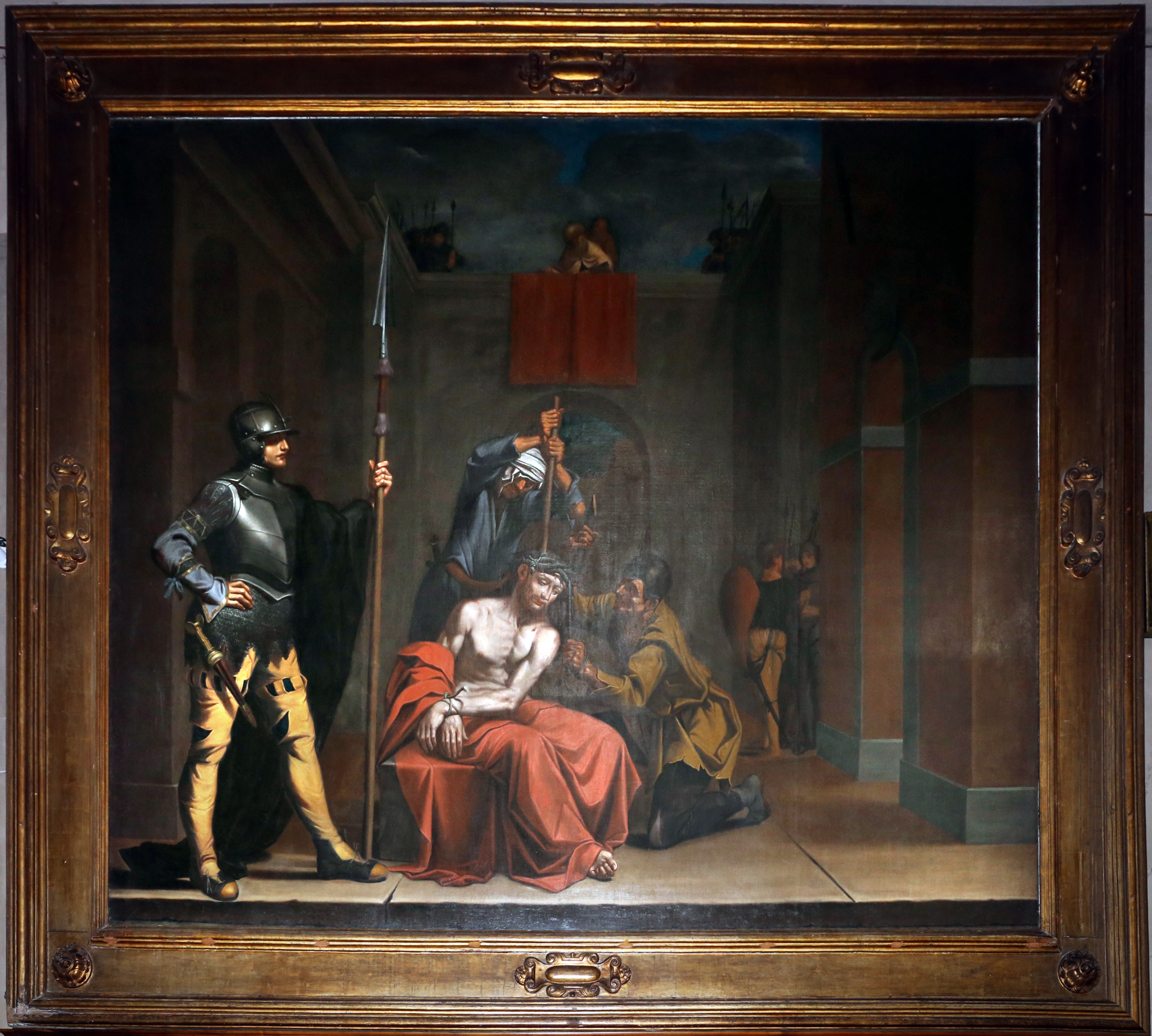
Christ Mocked, San Giorgio, Ferrara

Francesco Costanzo Catanio (1602 – 3 July 1665) was a painter of the Italian Baroque period, born and mainly active in Ferrara. He was variously known as Catanio, Cattani, Cattaneo, or Cattanio, sometimes without the forename Francesco.

== Life ==
Catanio was born in 1602 in Ferrara, at that time in the Papal States, now in Emilia-Romagna, the son of Giulio Cesare Catanio. He initially trained under Ippolito Scarsellino in Ferrara, until – because of his "...litigious and ill-tempered..." manner – his father sent him to Bologna to study in the school of Guido Reni. On the death of his father in 1627, he returned to Ferrara, where he came under the influence of Carlo Bononi, and began to paint in a style less influenced by Ludovico Carracci and more by Caravaggio.

Catanio was described as being prone to carrying a sword, hunting, and engaging in brawls. He was so quarrelsome and had such a turbulent disposition that he passed the greater portion of his life in exile or in disgrace. After injuring a soldier, Catanio was forced to seek refuge in the monastery of San Francesco, where he was employed in painting frescoes. He was able to travel with the Marchese Giraldi throughout Italy. In 1654, he travelled briefly to Rome in the patronage of Cardinal Carlo Pio di Savoia.

== Works ==
In his earliest works in Ferrara – a San Gregorio originally painted soon after 1630 for the church of that saint, now in Santa Maria dei Teatini, and the Coronazione di spine and Flagellazione in the Duomo from before 1636 – already show the influence of Caravaggio. He also painted studio portraits.

His Martirio di San Matteo for the church of Santo Spirito was probably painted soon after 1636, when the building was enlarged. During the Second World War two of his paintings were destroyed: a S. Luigi Gonzaga che rinuncia alla signoria di Castiglione in Santo Stefano (formerly in the Gesù); and an Orazione nell'Orto in San Benedetto.
