= Gianluca Gregori =

Physicist

- Education: University of Bologna; University of Minnesota
- Scientific career
- Workplaces: University of Oxford
- Website: www2.physics.ox.ac.uk/contacts/people/gregori

Gianluca Gregori is professor of physics within the Department of Physics, University of Oxford, and fellow and tutor in physics at Lady Margaret Hall, Oxford.

His awards include the Daiwa Adrian Prize in 2007, the Edouard Fabre prize in 2014, and the John Dawson Award for Excellence in Plasma Physics Research of the American Physical Society in both 2019 and 2020.
