= Giuseppe Avanzi =

Italian painter

Giuseppe Avanzi (30 August 1645 – 29 May 1718) was an Italian painter of the Baroque period, active mainly in Ferrara.

He trained with Cattaneo in Ferrara. He was a prolific painter of religious canvases in his natal city, including for the Certosa of Ferrara and the church of the Madonna della Pieta.
