= Antonio Randa =

Italian painter (1595–c. 1657)

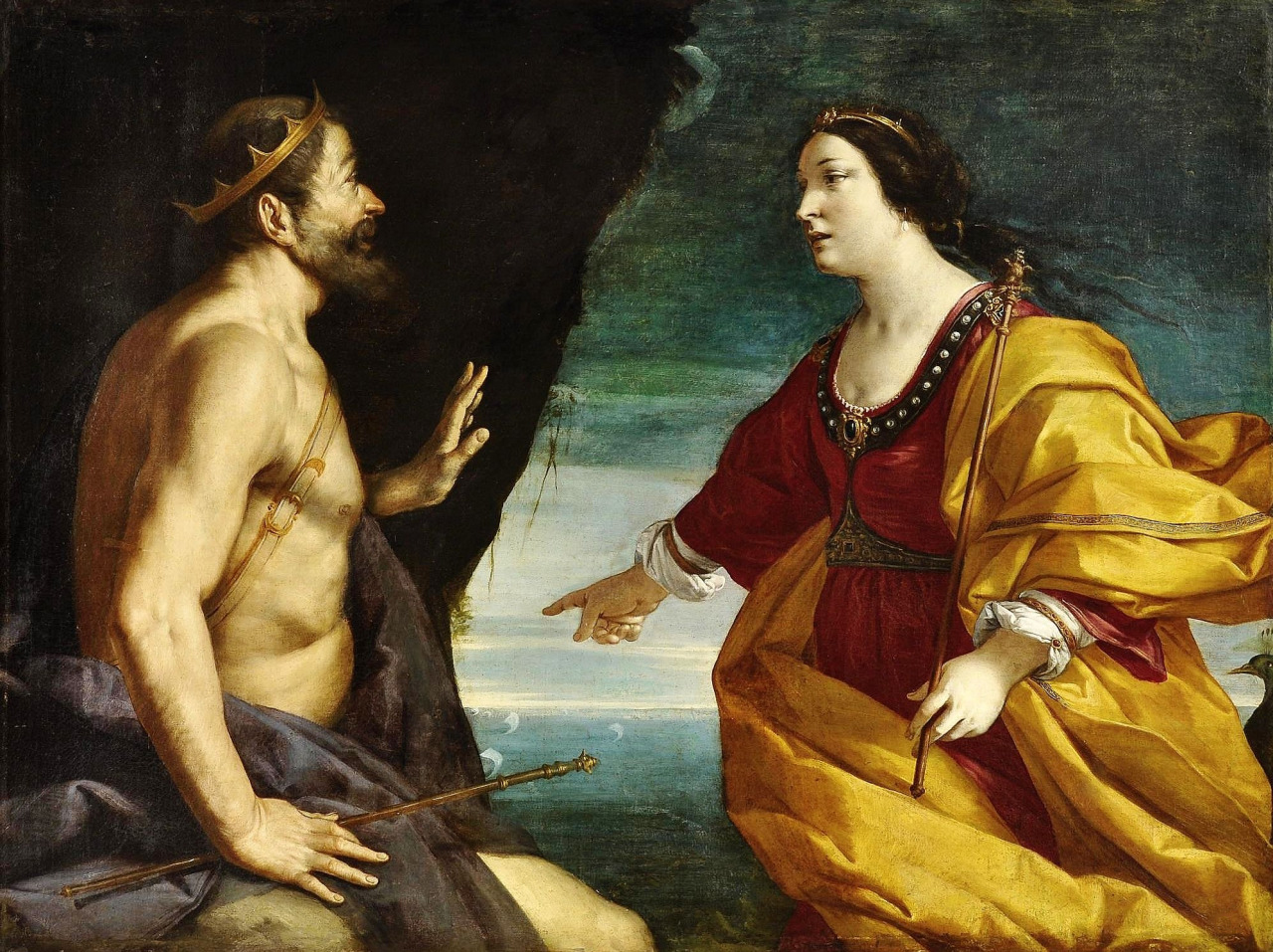
"Juno and Aeolus at the Cave of the Winds". Oil on canvas, Private Collection. About 1640

Antonio Randa (born around Bologna about 1595, died maybe in Ferrara after 1657) was an Italian painter of the classicist period, active in Ferrara, Modena, Rovigo, Florence, Comacchio and his native Bologna.

== Biography ==
Randa first trained with Guido Reni, but afterwards worked under Lucio Massari and later, as a colleague, with the same Massari and with Girolamo Curti. He left Bologna for Modena in 1614 after committing murder.

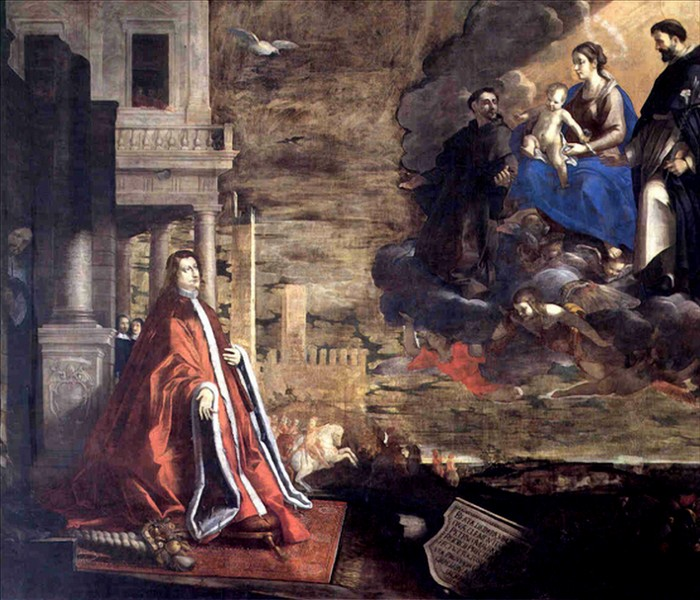
"Mayor Pietro Morosini Glorification" Rovigo, "Rotonda" Church, Oil on Canvas. Signed 1644

Many of his paintings are lost. At present we can see works of him in Milan (Cardinal's residence), San Giorgio di Piano (main church), Gherghenzano (local church), Bologna (Santa Maria della Vita Oratory), San Giovanni in Persiceto (Holy Art Museum), Modena (Estense Gallery), Rovigo ("Rotonda" church), Florence (altarpiece, two paintings and frescoes in the Certosa del Galluzzo), Comacchio (two altarpieces in the Suffragio church) and in private collections ("St. Cecilia singing"; "Juno and Aeolus at the Cave of the Winds").

In his last known painting, in Comacchio, Randa portrayed himself among the souls in the fires of Purgatory.

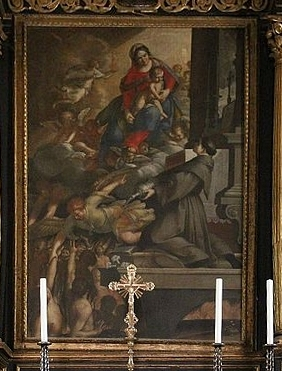
"Suffragio Madonna with Saint Anthony" Comacchio, Suffragio Oratory, Oil on Canvas. Post 1648

The painters Alessandro Provagli (died 1636) and Giuseppe Caletti (called "Cremonese") were his friends.
