= Domenico Mona =

Italian painter

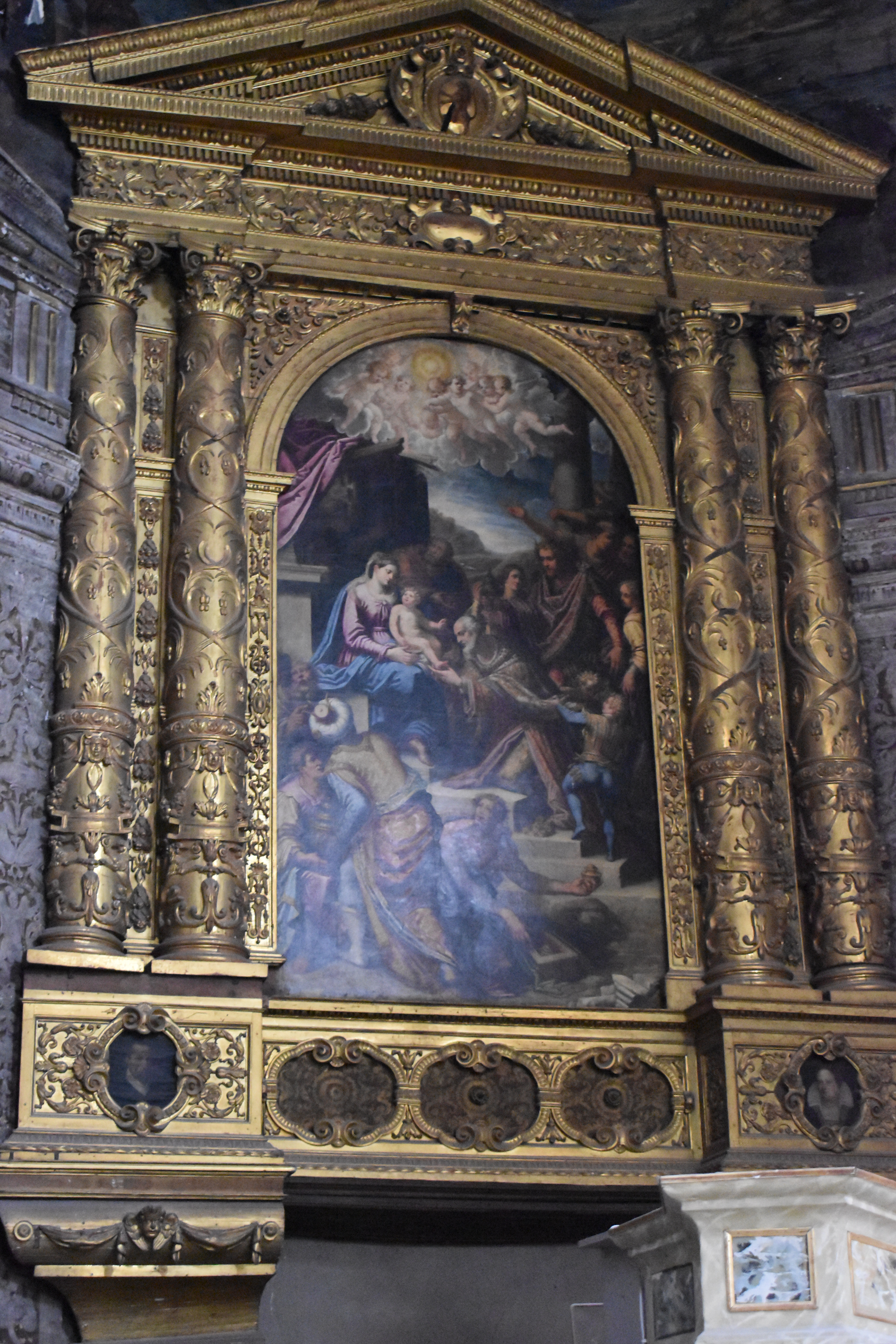
Adorazione dei Magi, Chiesa di San Paolo (Ferrara)

Domenico Mona (also called Moni, Monna, or Monio) (1550–1602) was an Italian painter of the late-Renaissance period, born in Ferrara.

== Biography ==
His biographer Cesare Cittadella (1782) describes a stormy early manhood, wherein Mona, born to a prestigious family, chose to become a cloistered monk at the Certosa of Ferrara. But a wish for more involvement in the world, and a romance, caused his departure the monastery. He initially contemplated studying philosophy, medicine, or law. He finally entered the studio of his godfather, the painter Giuseppe Mazzuoli, where he:

saw how through an excellent paintbrush, they represented the truth without deceit, they never arrived at too fantastic a metaphysics, or to an excessively vain and blind medicine, or a corrupt jurisprudence.

His work in Ferrara was prolific. He painted three large altarpieces for the church of San Francesco in Ferrara. Many works can be found in the church of Santa Maria in Vado. He painted for many other churches in Ferrara. However, his temper caused him to attack a visiting papal legate, and he had to flee to Bologna, then Modena and Parma, for safety.

Among his disciples were Giacomo Bambini and Giulio Cromer.
