= Camillo Rizzi =

Italian painter

Camillo Rizzi (or Ricci) (1590–1626) was an Italian painter of the Renaissance period, active mainly in Ferrara. He was a pupil of the painter Ippolito Scarsella.

Born at Ferrara, he was mainly active producing altarpieces for the churches of Ferrara including a S. Vincenzo and Santa Margherita for the cathedral; an Annunciation for the church of Spirito Santo; and his ceiling in the church of S. Niccolo, representing in eighty-four compartments, the Life and miracles of San Niccolo. Ricci died at Ferrara.
