= Bartolommeo Bonone =

Italian painter

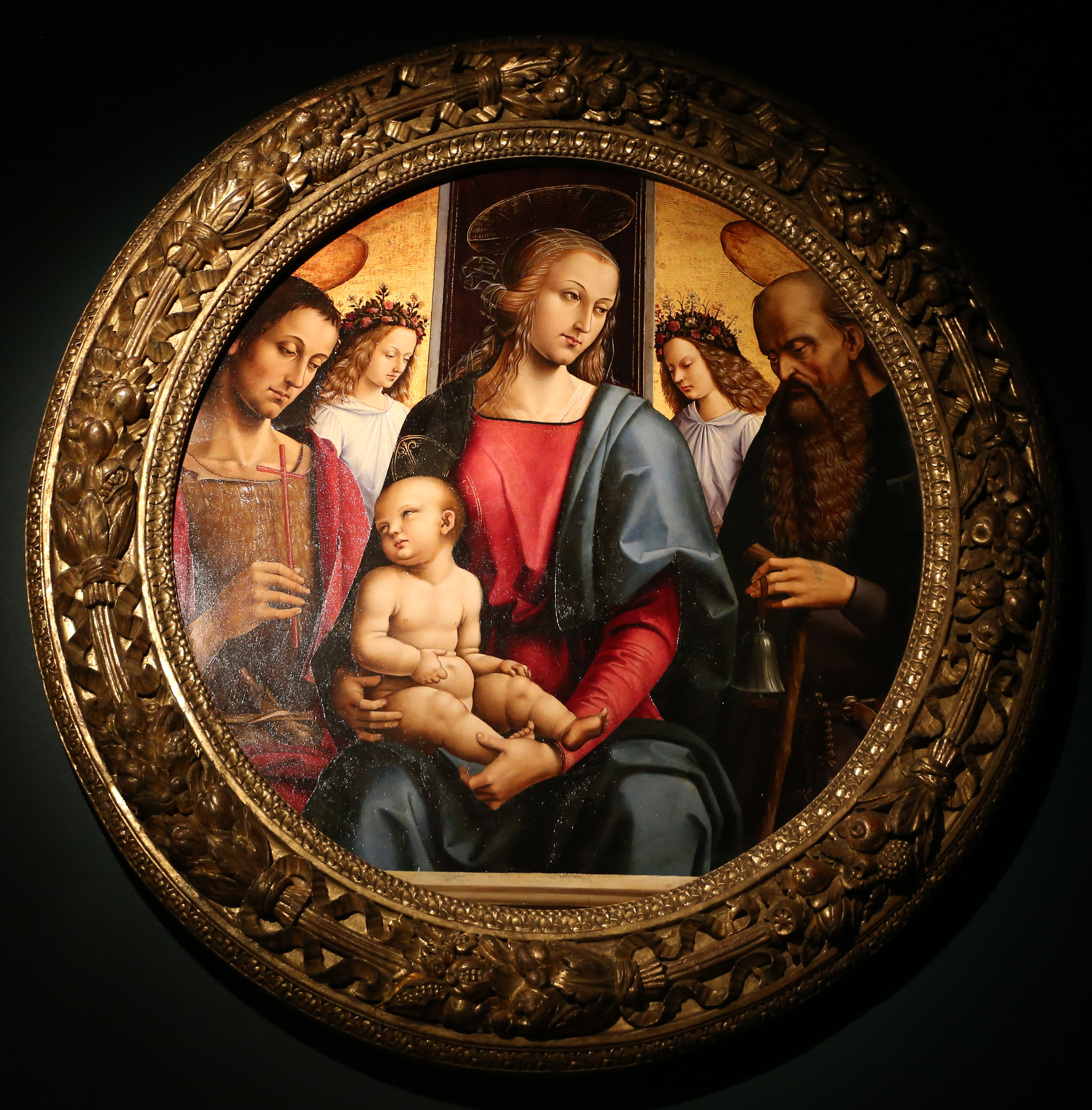
Madonna and saints, private collection

Bartolommeo Bonone, also called Bartolomeo Bernardi, (active 1491–1528) was an Italian painter of the Renaissance period.

He was son of an architect named Bologna or Bonone from Fontanella in the province of Bologna. He painted an altarpiece for the church of San Francesco, Pavia, now in the Petit Palais, Avignon. He is also the author of a Crucifixion fresco in the Duomo of Piacenza. He is the author of a Virgin in Glory (1507). He is thought to have been a native of Pavia.
