= Carlo Cozza =

Italian painter

Carlo Cozza (c. 1700–1769) was an Italian painter, the son of Giovanni Battista Cozza (1676–1742). He was born and died in Ferrara. He trained under his father, and painted mainly for the churches of his native city. In the Chiesa Nuova is a picture by him of the Annunciation; in the church of Santa Lucia of St. Anthony the Abbot; and in San Matteo of St. Francis of Paola.
