= Giacomo Parolini =

Italian painter (1663–1733)

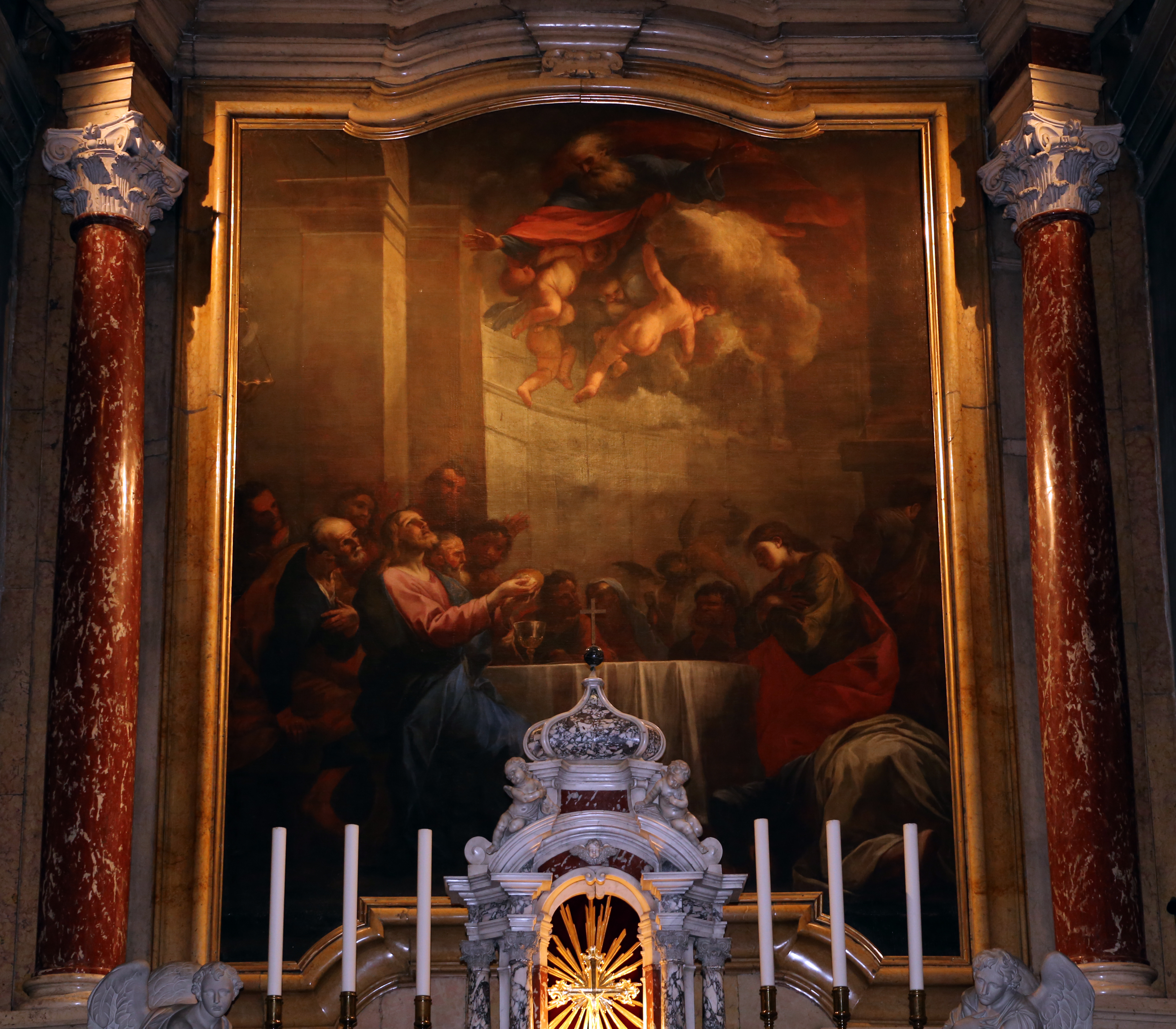
Last Supper, Ferrara Cathedral

Giacomo Parolini (May 1, 1663 – 1733) was an Italian painter of the Baroque period, mainly active in Ferrara.

He initially traveled with Giovanni Francesco Viterbi to Turin to study law, but then went to study painting in Turin with Peruzzini Anconitano, who had trained with Simone Cantarini. He travels with Viterbi to Bologna in 1679, where he apprentices with Carlo Cignani in Bologna, till the latter leaves for Forlì. In Bologna he worked with Giovanni Gioseffo dal Sole and Giuseppe Maria Crespi. He then traveled to Turin, Venice and Rome. In about 1699, he returns to Ferrara where he marries.

He painted the ceiling of Carmine in San Paolo. In the Certosa he painted a Crucifixion. He painted numerous other altarpieces in Ferrara, including a Last supper in cathedral and a St. Sebastian for the church of San Sebastiano of Verona. Among his pupils were Girolamo Gregori and Giovanni Francesco Braccioli.
