= Jacopo Bambini =

Italian painter

Jacopo Bambini (1582–1629, also known as Giacomo Bambini) was an Italian painter of the Baroque period, active mainly in Ferrara.

He trained with Domenico Mona. Along with Giulio Croma (Giulio Cromer), he set up a painter's academy in Ferrara. He painted three altarpieces for the cathedral: a Flight into Egypt, an Annunciation, and a Conversion of St. Paul. He died at Ferrara. An account of his other works will be found in Barotti's Future e Scolture di Ferrara.
