= Giuseppe Mazzuoli (c. 1536 – 1589) =

Italian painter

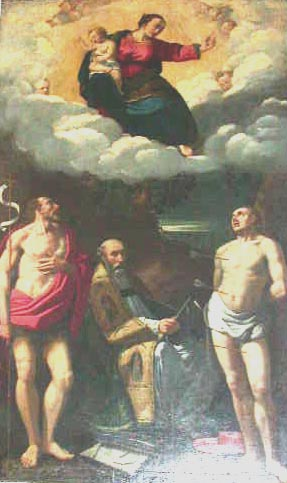
Virgin and Child with Saints by Mazzuoli

Giuseppe Mazzuoli (c. 1536 – 9 November 1589) was an Italian painter of the Mannerist period, active mainly in the court of Alfonso II d'Este of Ferrara.

He is nicknamed il Bastaruolo (or il Bastarolo by authors writing in English), from a dialect term describing his father's profession selling foodstuffs, including corn (biade). He painted the ceiling of the church of the Gesu in Ferrara, a work started by Giovanni Francesco Surchi. Mazzuoli was reportedly a pupil of Dosso Dossi, and the teacher of Carlo Bononi and Domenico Moni. Among his works were some altarpieces for the Cathedral of Ferrara.

== Bibliography ==
- Camillo Laderchi (1856). La pittura ferrarese, memorie. Googlebooks. pp. 114–115.
