= Giovanni Francesco Braccioli =

Italian painter (1697–1762)

Giovanni Francesco Braccioli (1697 – 16 July 1762) was an Italian painter of the Baroque period, mainly active in Ferrara.

Born in Ferrara, he first trained with Giacomo Parolini, and then with Giuseppe Maria Crespi in Bologna. He painted mainly religious altarpieces in Ferrara. On his return to Ferrara he painted for churches and convents. For the Oratory of the Theatines, he painted an Annunciation and in the church of St Catherine there are two pictures, one Flagellation and the other Christ crowned with Thorns. He died at Ferrara. Laderchi stated that his melancholy diverged into madness.
