= Lionello Bononi =

Italian painter

Lionello Bononi was an Italian painter of the Baroque period. He was the nephew and pupil of Carlo Bononi, and active c. 1649. The excellent instruction of his uncle might have enabled him to arrive at celebrity in the art, but his negligence and depravity of conduct prevented his ever going beyond mediocrity. His most creditable performances are two pictures he painted for trie chapel of the hospital of Santa Maria Novella, representing The Visitation of the Virgin to St. Elizabeth and The Holy Family.
