= Francesco Naselli =

Italian painter

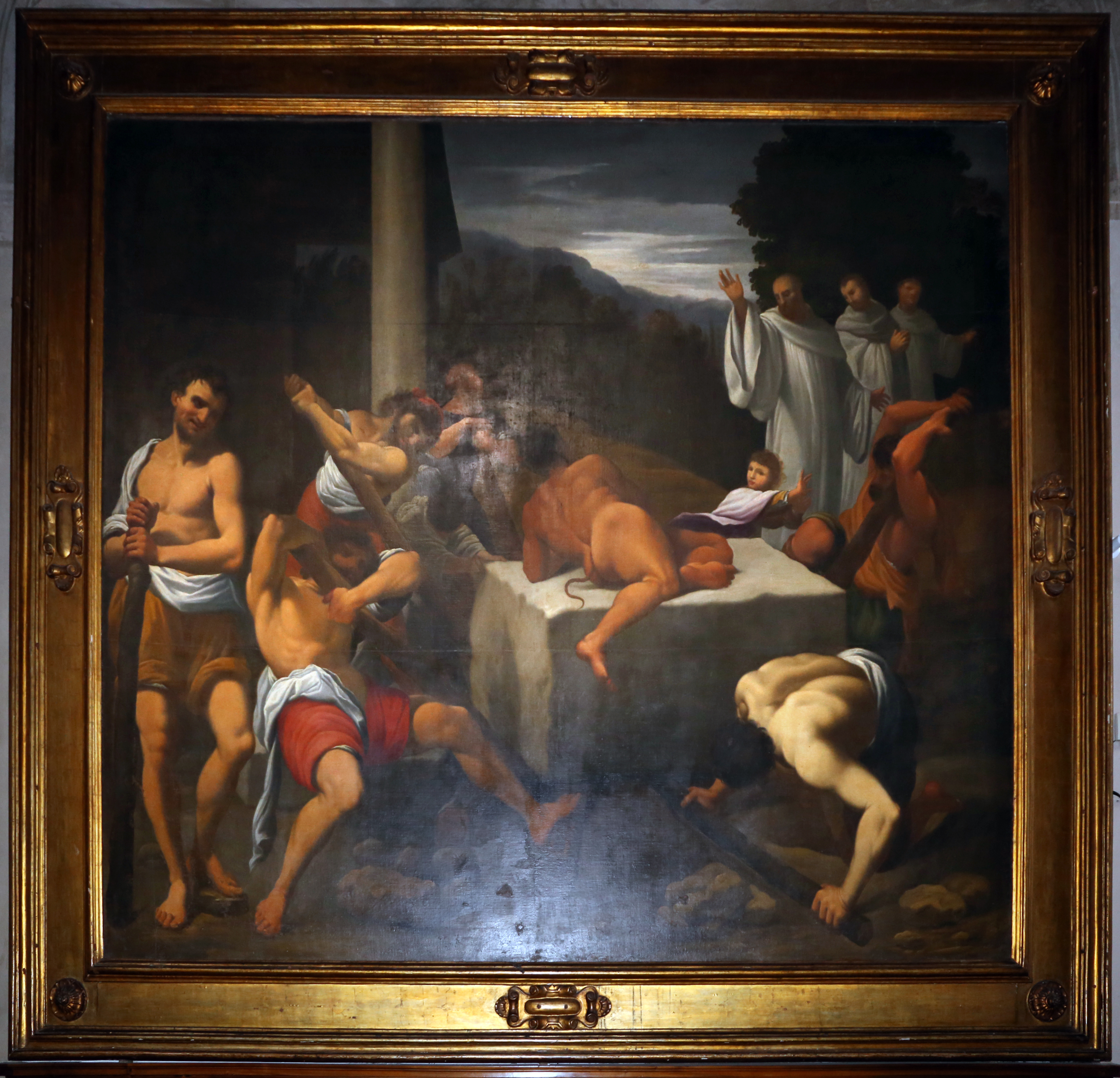
Saint benedict miracle (after Ludovico carracci), San Giorgio, Ferrara

Francesco Naselli was an Italian painter of the Baroque period.

== Biography ==
He was born at Ferrara, and flourished about the year 1610. When young, he studied the works of the Carracci and Guercino, which he copied with surprising success, but afterwards devoted himself to the manner of his countryman Giuseppe Mazzola. He was employed for several of the churches in Ferrara. In the Cathedral there is an altarpiece by him, representing the Nativity; in the church of Santa Maria de' Servi, a large picture of the Last Supper; and in the church of Santa Francesca, the Assumption of the Virgin.

Naselli died at Ferrara about 1630. He is said to be the father of Alessandro Naselli, another Ferrarese painter.
