= Carlo Bononi =

Italian painter (c.1569–1632)

Carlo Bononi (1569? - 1632) was an Italian painter. An 1876 book lists him among "the last artists of any eminence in Ferrara".

== Biography ==
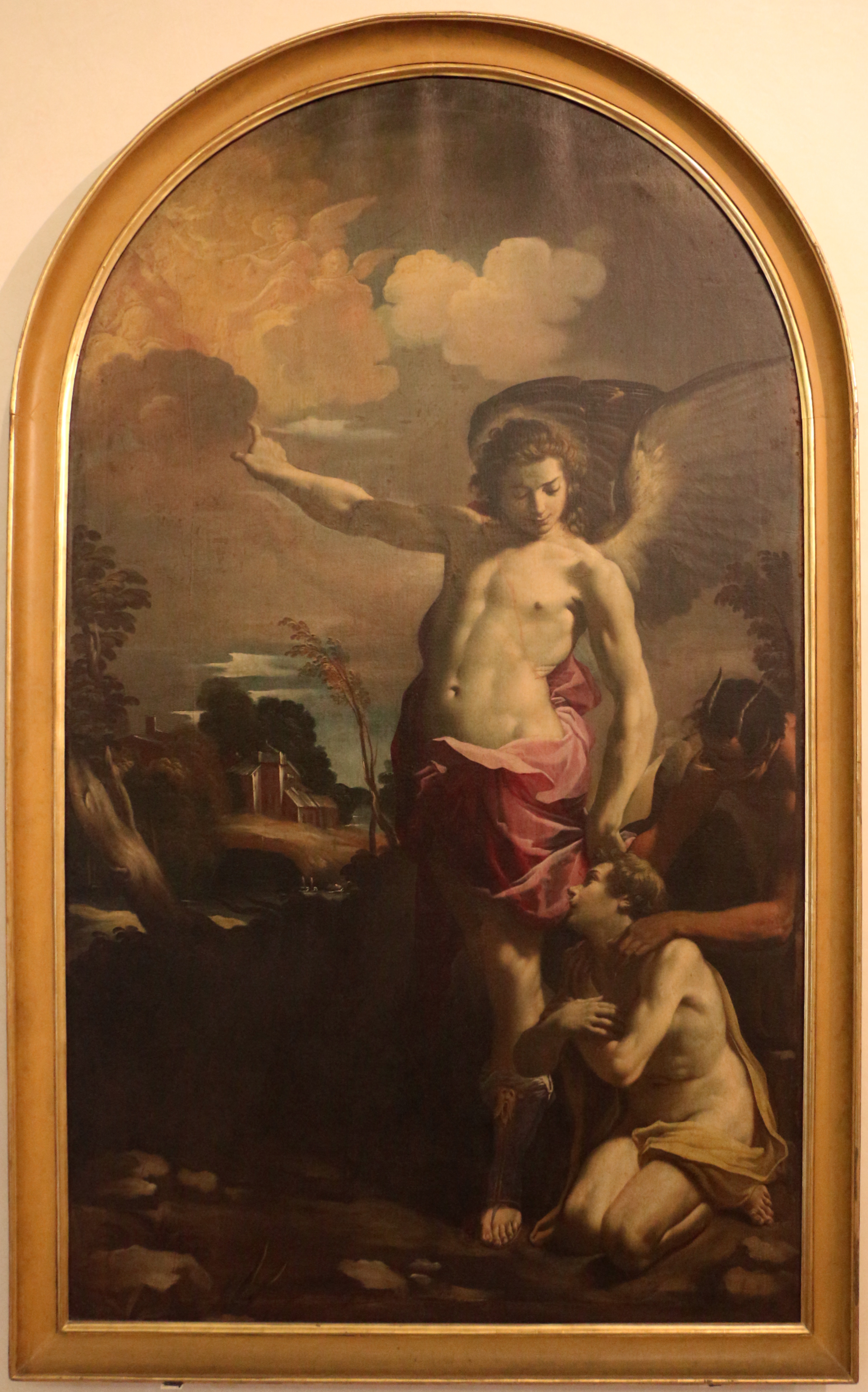
Guardian Angel, (late 1620s, National picture gallery at Palazzo dei Diamanti, Ferrara)

Bononi was active mainly in his home territories of Emilia and Ferrara, and is considered to be a painter of the School of Ferrara. He studied under Giuseppe Mazzuoli, known as il Bastarolo. He knew Guercino and was eulogized by Guido Reni as having a "bounty of a most honest life, a great knowledge of design, and strength in colorizing". Bononi rose to prominence in Ferrara after the death of the painter Scarsellino, and was subsequently called to Rome. He was initially buried in Santa Maria in Vado, for which he had helped decorate the ceiling with various canvases.

Among his pupils were Alfonso Rivarola (il Chenda), Giovanni Battista dalla Torre, and Camillo Berlinghieri. His nephew, Leonello Bononi was also a painter.

An important exhibition has been held at Palazzo dei Diamanti in Ferrara in Autumn 2017.

== Selected works ==
- Second of four chapels, (Basilica della Ghiara, Reggio Emilia)
- St Louis of Toulouse Praying for the end of the Plague (Kunsthistoriches Museum, Vienna)
- Madonna of Loreto appearing to Saints John the Evangelist, Bartholemew, and James the Great,
- Guardian Angel (late 1620s, National picture gallery at Palazzo dei Diamanti, Ferrara)
- Ste Barbara
- Saint Dominic in Soriano, Church of St Dominic, Ferrara.
- Saint Sebastian and the Angel , late 1620s, Musée des Beaux-Arts de Strasbourg

== Sources ==
- Fondazione Manodori website.
- Francis P. Smyth and John P. O'Neill (Editors in Chief (1986). National Gallery of Art, Washington DC (ed.). The Age of Correggio and the Carracci: Emilian Painting of the 16th and 17th Centuries. pp. 379–85.
- Camillo Laderchi (1856). La pittura ferrarese, memorie. Googlebooks. pp. 148–153.
