= Scarsellino =

Italian painter

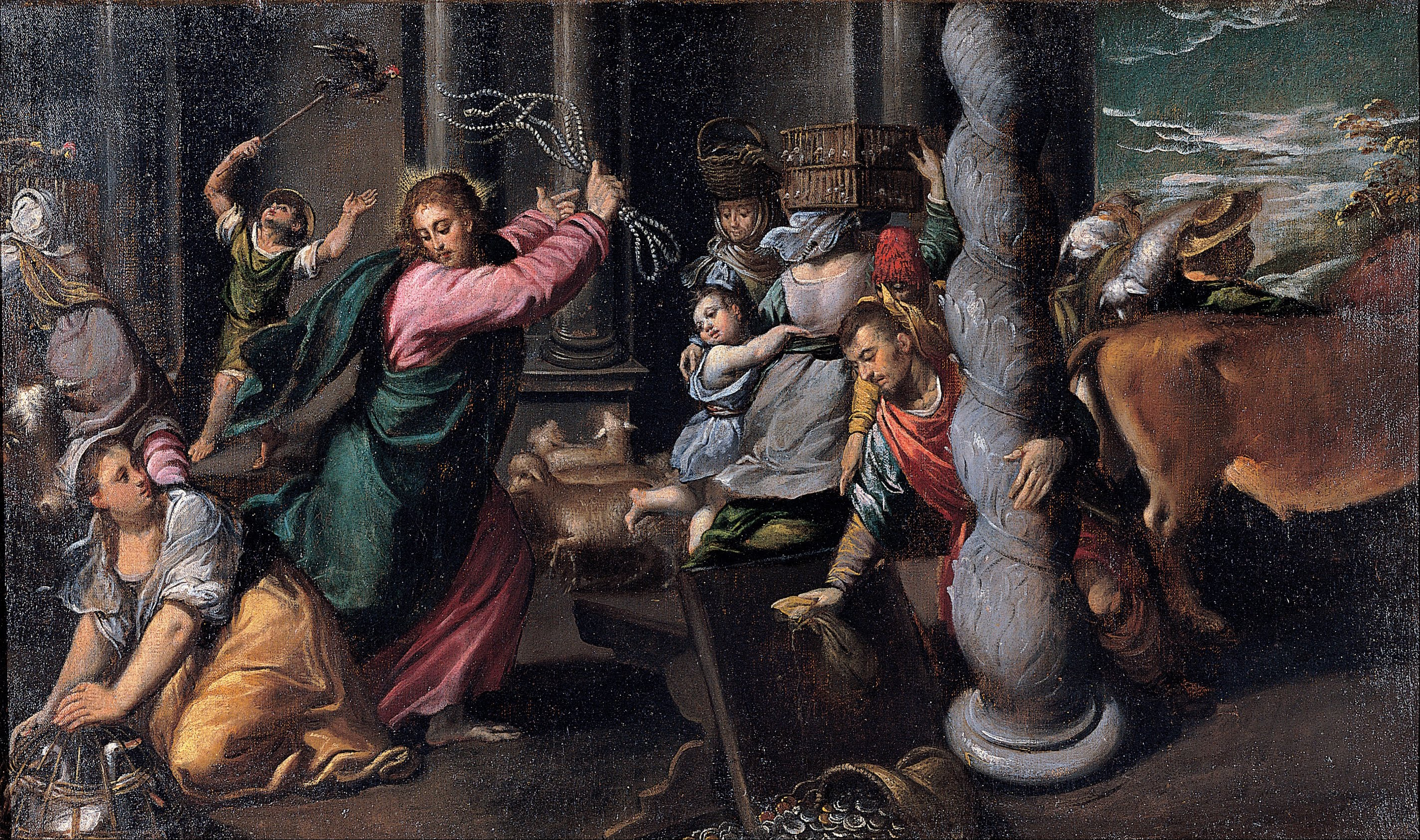
Driving of the merchants from the temple

Scarsellino or Ippolito Scarsella (1550 (or 1551) – 28 October 1620) was an Italian mid-to-late sixteenth century reformist painter and one of the most important representatives of the School of Ferrara. His landscapes of both sacred and secular themes strongly anticipate the landscape painting traditions of the 17th century.

== Life ==
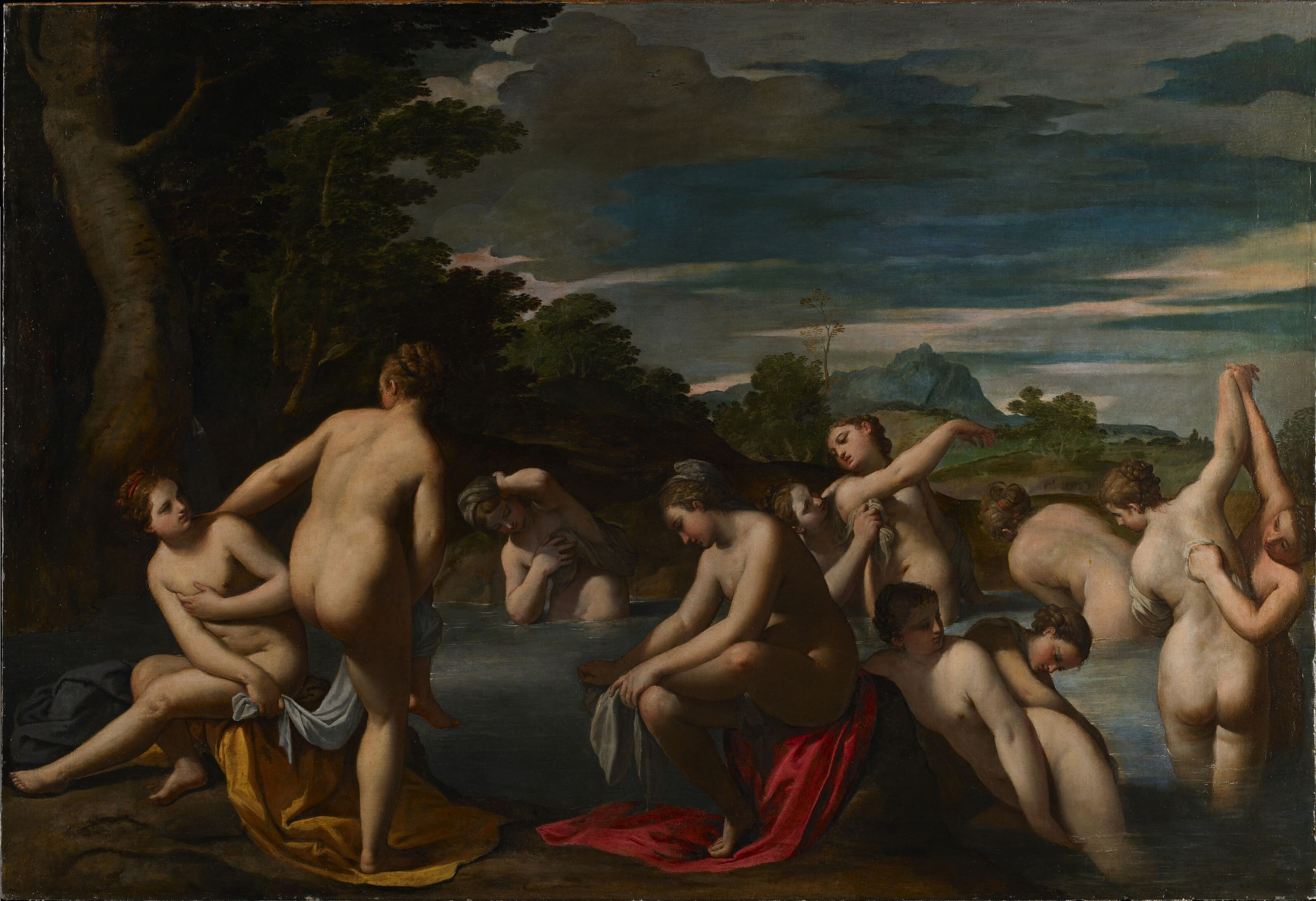
Nymphs at the Bath

Ippolito Scarsella was born and died in Ferrara. His father was the lesser-known painter Sigismondo Scarsella, who was particularly skilled as an architect. Scarsellino traveled and worked extensively across Italy, encountering many influences.

He lived in Venice for four years around 1570. The exact date is not known. He reportedly trained in Venice in the studio of Veronese. Scarsellino worked alongside the brothers Carracci in the Palazzo dei Diamanti in Ferrara. As can be observed from their works, the Ferrarese artist and the Bolognese painters exhibited a reciprocal influence upon one another. To name just one of many examples, Ludovico Carracci's 1616 Martyrdom of Saint Margaret for the Church of San Maurizio in Mantua takes its inspiration from Scarsellino's painting of the same subject, executed five years prior for the Oratory of Saint Margaret in Ferrara.

One of Scarsellino's most important pupils was Costanzo Cattani.

== Work ==
Scarsellino was an easel painter as well as a fresco artist. He often painted the same subject with variations, in a range of different formats and supports. His early works show the influences of various contemporary styles. Initially he was inspired by the elegant figures of Parmigianino (1503–1540), which were introduced in Ferrara by Girolamo da Carpi (1501 – c. 1557). He later set himself apart from this intellectual and highly formal vision of Mannerism by turning towards the magical, mood-driven world of Dosso Dossi. During his stay in Venice he was introduced to the late works of Giorgione and those of Veronese and Titian, which were an important influence on his work.

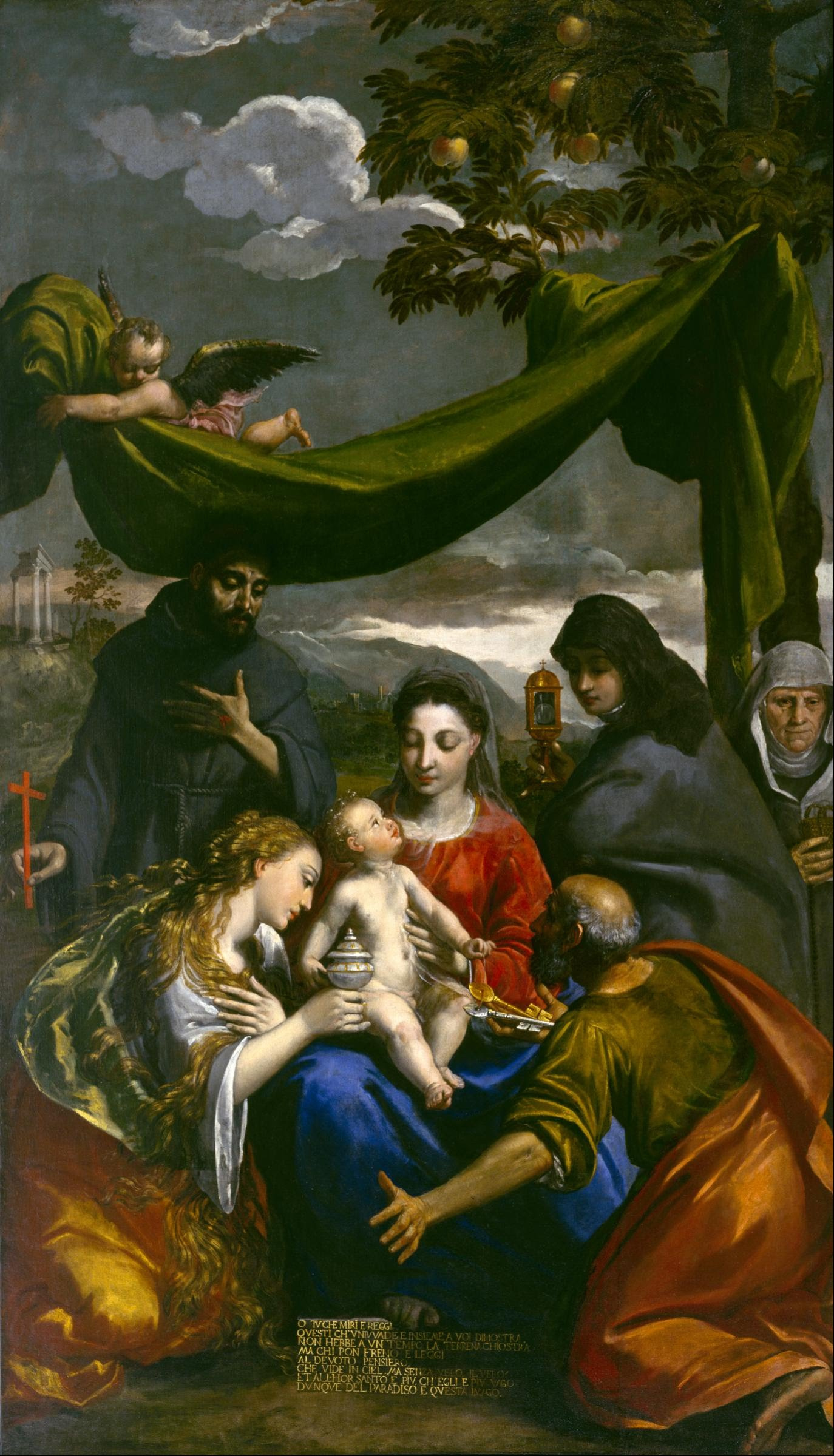
Virgin and Child with Saints Mary Magdalene, Peter, Clare, Francis, and an Abbess

A number of his works are in the collection of the Galleria Borghese in Rome, The Bathing Venus, Diana and Endymion and Venus and Adonis. Two of his paintings were destroyed during the bombing of Dresden at the end of World War II: Flight into Egypt and Holy Family at Work.

== Selected works ==
- The Way to Calvary (Museum of Fine Arts, Boston)
- The Martyrdom of Saint Venanatius of Camerino (Houston)
- Fame Conquering Time (Wadsworth Atheneum, Hartford).
- Virgin Adored by Saints (1609; Metropolitan Museum of Art, New York)
- Landscape with Abraham and Isaac (Fitzwilliam Museum, Cambridge)
- Apollo (MFA, San Francisco)
- Madonna with Saints (c1600; MFA, Houston)
- Adoration of the Magi (c1600, Capitoline Museums, Rome)
- Allegorical Scene (Pinacoteca Nazionale, Ferrara)
- Saint Demetrius (Museum of Fine Arts, Boston)
- Virgin and Angels Imploring Christ not to Punish Lust, Avarice, and Pride (Pinacoteca, Vatican)
- Judgment of Paris (Uffizi Gallery, Florence)
