= Palazzo dei Diamanti =

Coordinates: 44.84208°N 11.62106°E

National Art Gallery of Ferrara Pinacoteca Nazionale di Ferrara
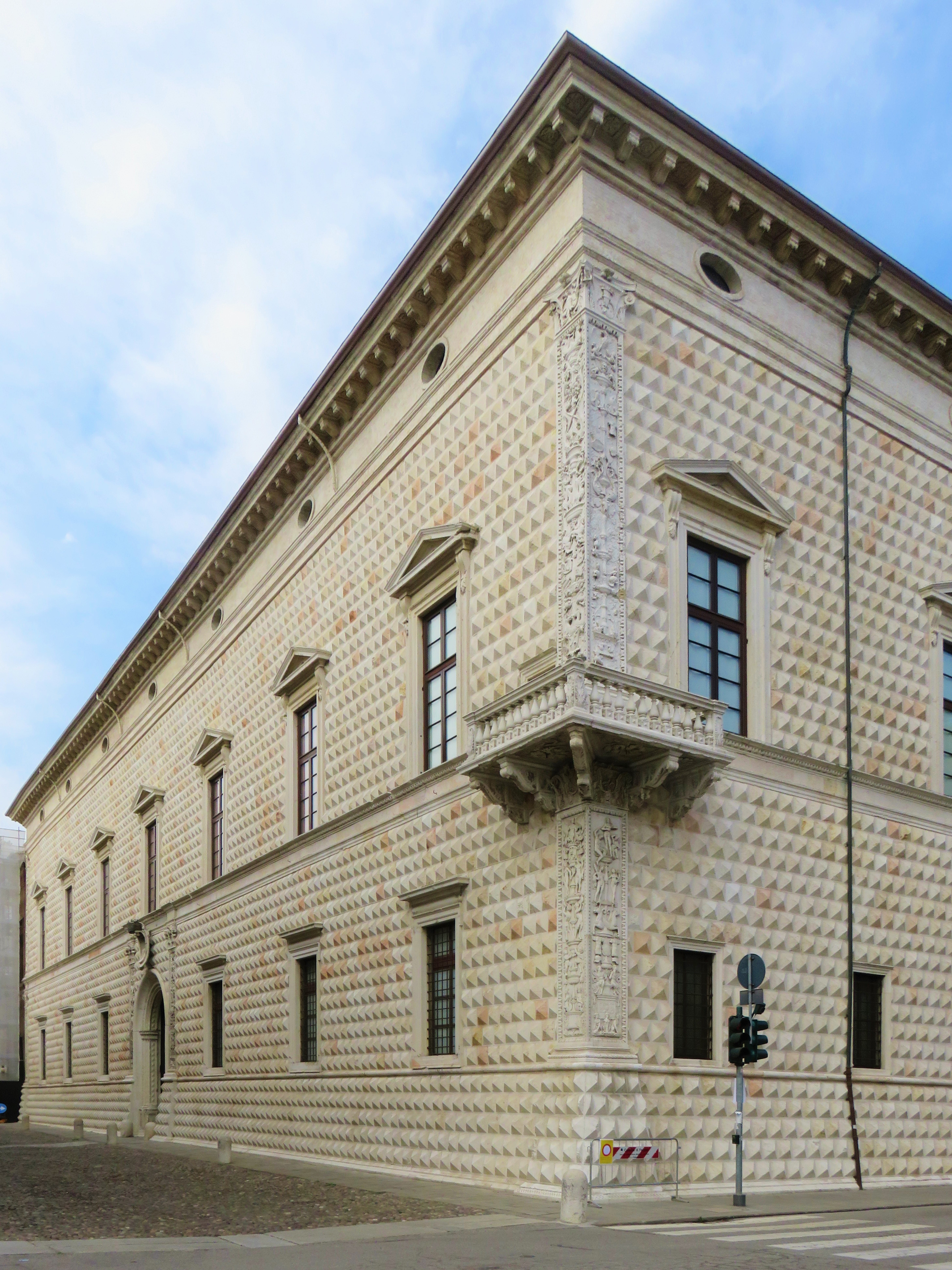
- Location: Corso Ercole I d'Este, 21, Ferrara, Italy
- Type: Art gallery
- Website: www.gallerie-estensi.beniculturali.it/pinacoteca-nazionale

The Palazzo dei Diamanti is a Renaissance palace located on Corso Ercole I d'Este 21 in Ferrara, a city in the Italian region of Emilia Romagna. The main floor of the palace houses the Pinacoteca Nazionale di Ferrara (National Painting Gallery of Ferrara).

== History ==
To accommodate the growth of Ferrara, in 1492 the Duke Ercole I d'Este demolished the medieval walls of the city on the north and had the court architect, Biagio Rossetti, design an urban expansion known as the Addizione Erculea. Rosetti was commissioned by Sigismondo d'Este, brother of the Duke Ercole I, to build this palace at the prestigious intersection of what was to be the Decumanus Maximus (now encompassing Corsi Porta Po, Biagio Rossetti, and Porta Mare) and Cardo Maximus (Corso Ercole I d'Este) of the "urban addition". It was built between 1493 and 1503. Used as a residential home by the Este family and, starting in 1641, by the Villa marquis, in 1832 the palace was acquired by the municipality of Ferrara to house the National Gallery of Art and the Civic University.

== Architecture ==
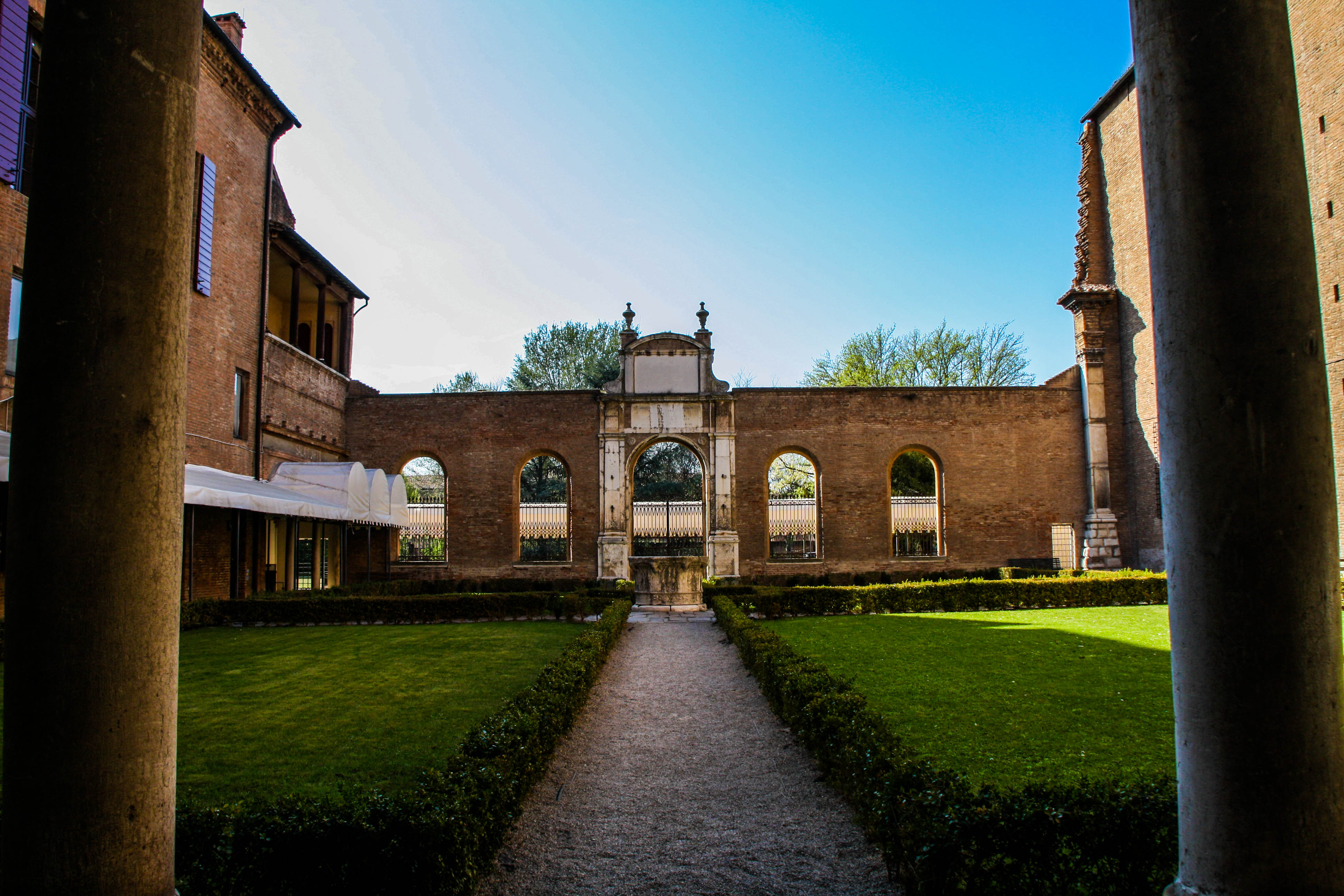
View across the courtyard

The most striking feature is the bugnato of the exterior walls: it consists of some 8,500 white (with pink veins) marble blocks carved to represent diamonds, hence its name. The positioning of the diamonds varies in order to maximize the light reflected off the building, creating quite the visual effect. The palace is also well known for its candelabra and the phytomorphic corner motifs. Inside, it has a typical Renaissance courtyard with a cloister and a marble well; the latter is a characteristic typical of gardens in Ferrara.

== Pinacoteca Nazionale di Ferrara ==
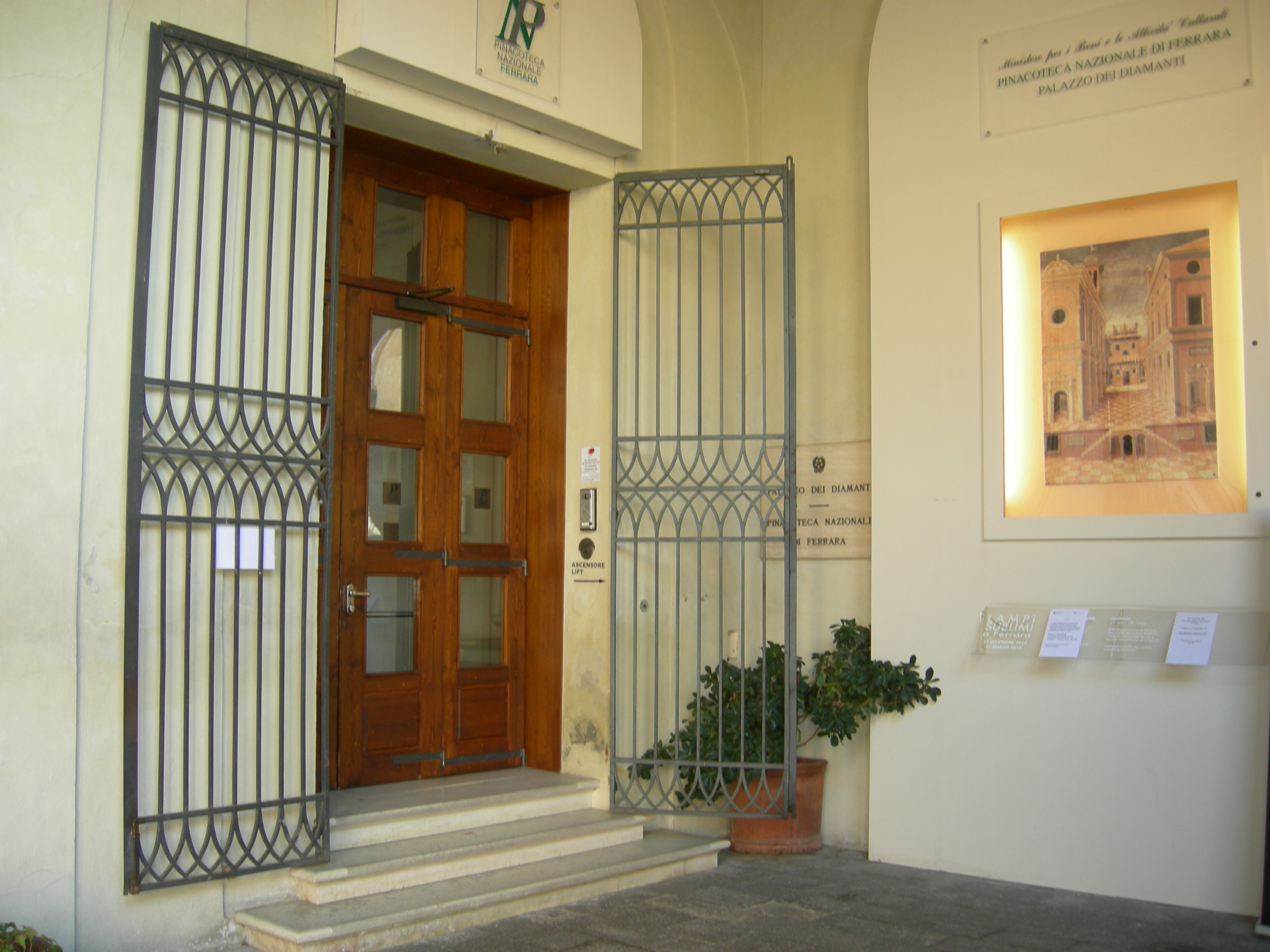
Entrance to the Pinacoteca Nazionale

The main floor of the palazzo houses the Pinacoteca Nazionale, with paintings from the Ferrarese school from the Middle Ages up to the 18th century. The oldest paintings are large frescoes (The Triumph of Saint Augustine by Serafino da Modena) and wooden panels with gold-leaf backgrounds, such as the Madonna and Child by Gentile da Fabriano. The main artists from the 15th century in Ferrara represented in the museum are Cosmè Tura (Justice and The Martyrdom of Saint Maurelius), Ercole de' Roberti, Vicino da Ferrara and Michele Pannonio. There are works from the Este family collections, including a work by Andrea Mantegna (Christ Bearing the Soul of the Virgin). There are also two works by unidentified artists from the collection of the Marquis Leonello d'Este at the Palazzo Belfiore.

The major 16th-century Ferrarese painter, Garofalo, is represented by a number of works, including the Pala Costabili, done in collaboration with Dosso Dossi. The period of mannerism is represented by Bastianino, who uses a technique similar to that of Michelangelo in his works. Among the other artists in the collection are Amerigo Aspertini, Giuseppe Avanzi, Baldassarre d'Este, Jacopo Bambini, Bastarolo (Giuseppe Mazzuoli), Giovanni Bellini, Jacopo Bellini, il Ortolano, Carlo Bononi (1569–1632), Vittore Carpaccio, Girolamo da Carpi (1500–1556), Agostino Carracci, Ludovico Carracci, Coltellini (1480–1535/42), Francesco del Cossa (1435/1436–1478), Lorenzo Costa (c. 1460–1535), Giulio Cromer, Girolamo Domenichini, Battista Dossi (c. 1490–1548), Francesco Francia (1450–1517), Gaetano Gandolfi, Ubaldo Gandolfi, Maestro degli Occhi Spalancati, Maineri, Giovanni da Modena (active 1398), Ludovico Mazzolino (c. 1480), Panetti, Giacomo Parolini, Nicolò Pisano (Nicolò dell'Abrugia), Nicolò Roselli (1500–c. 1580), Maurelio Scannavini, Scarsellino (c. 1550–1620), Simone de Crocifissi, Tintoretto, Bartolomeo Vivarini, and Giuseppe Zola (1672–1743).

== Civic Gallery of Modern and Contemporary Art ==
On the lower floor is the Civic Gallery of Modern and Contemporary Art, which has hosted high-level temporary shows since 1992, when the space was inaugurated by the show on Claude Monet and His Friends. Some of the most important shows held here have included:

- From Dahl to Edvard Munch and Alfred Sisley: Poet of Impressionism in 2002,
- Edgar Degas and the Italians in Paris in 2003,
- Cubism: Revolution and Tradition in 2004,
- Corot: Nature, Emotions, Memory in 2006,
- André Derain and Symbolism in 2007,
- Cosmè Tura and Francesco del Cossa: The Art of Ferrara at the Time of Borso d'Este and Joan Miró: The Land in 2008,
- Turner and Italy in 2009,
- Giovanni Boldini in Paris During Impressionism, From Braque to Kandinsky to Chagall: Aimé Maeght and His Artists in 2010
- Jean-Baptiste-Siméon Chardin: The Painter of Silence in 2010–2011,
- Gli anni folli. La Parigi di Modigliani, Picasso, Dalì 1918–1933 in 2011–2012,
- Sorolla. Giardini di luce in 2012,
- Lo sguardo di Michelangelo Antonioni e le arti and Zurbarán (1598–1664) in 2013,
- Matisse. La Figura. La forza della linea, l'emozione del colore in 2014.
- La Rosa de Foc Picasso and Gaudí's Barcelona in 2015.

== See also ==
- Casa dos Bicos
- Palace of Facets
