= School of Ferrara =

Group of painters

The School of Ferrara was a group of painters which flourished in the Duchy of Ferrara during the Renaissance. Ferrara was ruled by the Este family, well known for its patronage of the arts. Patronage was extended with the ascent of Ercole d'Este I in 1470, and the family continued in power till Alfonso II, Ercole's great-grandson, died without an heir in 1597. The duchy was then occupied in succession by Papal and Austrian forces. The school evolved styles of painting that appeared to blend influences from Mantua, Venice, Lombardy, Bologna, and Florence.

The ties to Bolognese School were particularly strong. Much of the local collections, like those of the Gonzaga family in Mantua, were dispersed with the end of the Este line in 1598. Especially in the late 15th century Ferrara was also a main centre of engraving in Italy. The most famous prints it produced are the two sets traditionally, if inaccurately, known as the Mantegna Tarocchi, each by an unidentified master. A list of painters of the School of Ferrara, with the page for the title entry in Camillo Laderchi's 1856 artist biography, includes:

== 14th century and before ==
- Gelasio di Nicoló, p20
- Cristoforo da Bologna, p28
- Antonio Alberti, p29

== 15th century ==
- Galasso Galassi
- Cosimo Tura, p30
- Francesco Cossa, p32
- Bono da Ferrara, p33
- Stefano da Ferrara, p37
- Baldassare Estense, p38
- Antonio Aleotti, p39
- Ercole Grandi, p51
- Ludovico Mazzolino, p54
- Michele Cortellini, p39
- Ercole de' Roberti
- Lorenzo Costa, p57
- Francesco and Bernardino Zaganelli da Cotignola, p58
- Benedetto Coda, p59
- Boccaccio Boccaccino
- Domenico Panetti, p61
- Giovanni Battista Benvenuti (also called L'Ortolano Ferrarese) (1490–1525)
- Taddeo Crivelli

== 16th century ==
- Nicolo Pisano
- Dosso Dossi, p62
- Giovanni Battista Dossi
- Girolamo da Carpi, p105
- Niccolò Roselli, p109
- Benvenuto Tisi (il Garofalo), p73
- Ludovico Mazzolino
- Sigismondo Scarsella, p124
- Scarsellino (Ippolito Scarsella), p125
- Costanzo Cattanio
- Giovanni Francesco Surchi
- Camillo Ricci, p135
- Domenico Mona, p121
- Sebastiano Filippi (Bastianino)
- Gaspare Venturini, p137
- Giovanni Andrea Ghirardoni, p138
- Giovanni Paolo Grazzini, p138
- Jacopo Bambini, p139
- Giulio Cromer, p140

== 17th–18th centuries ==
- Carlo Bononi (also active in Bologna and Mantua), p141
- Alfonso Rivarola, p153
- Giovanni Battista della Torre, p154
- Camillo Berlinghieri, p155
- Ippolito Caselli, p155
- Francesco Naselli, p156
- Ercole Sarti, p157
- Giovanni Francesco Barbieri (Guercino) born in Cento, p159
- Paolo Antonio Barbieri, p168
- Benedetto Genari the elder, p158
- Cesare Genari, p170
- Giuseppe Caletti, p170
- Ludovico Lana, p172
- Francesco Costanzo Cattaneo, p172
- Giuseppe Bonati, p173
- Giuseppe Avanzi, p175
- Orazio and Cesare Mornasi, p175
- Francesco and Antonio Ferrari, p176
- Francesco Scala, p177
- Maurelio Scanavini, p178
- Giacomo Parolini, p179
- Giuseppe Zola, p181
- Giovanni Francesco Braccioli, p182
- Antonio Contri, p183
- Giuseppe Ghedini, p183
- Giovanni Monti, p184
- Alberto Muchiatti, p184
- Giuseppe Santi, p184
- Giovanni Masi, p185

== See also ==
- Lucchese School
- Florentine painting
- Sienese School
- Renaissance in Emilia
