= Costabili collection =

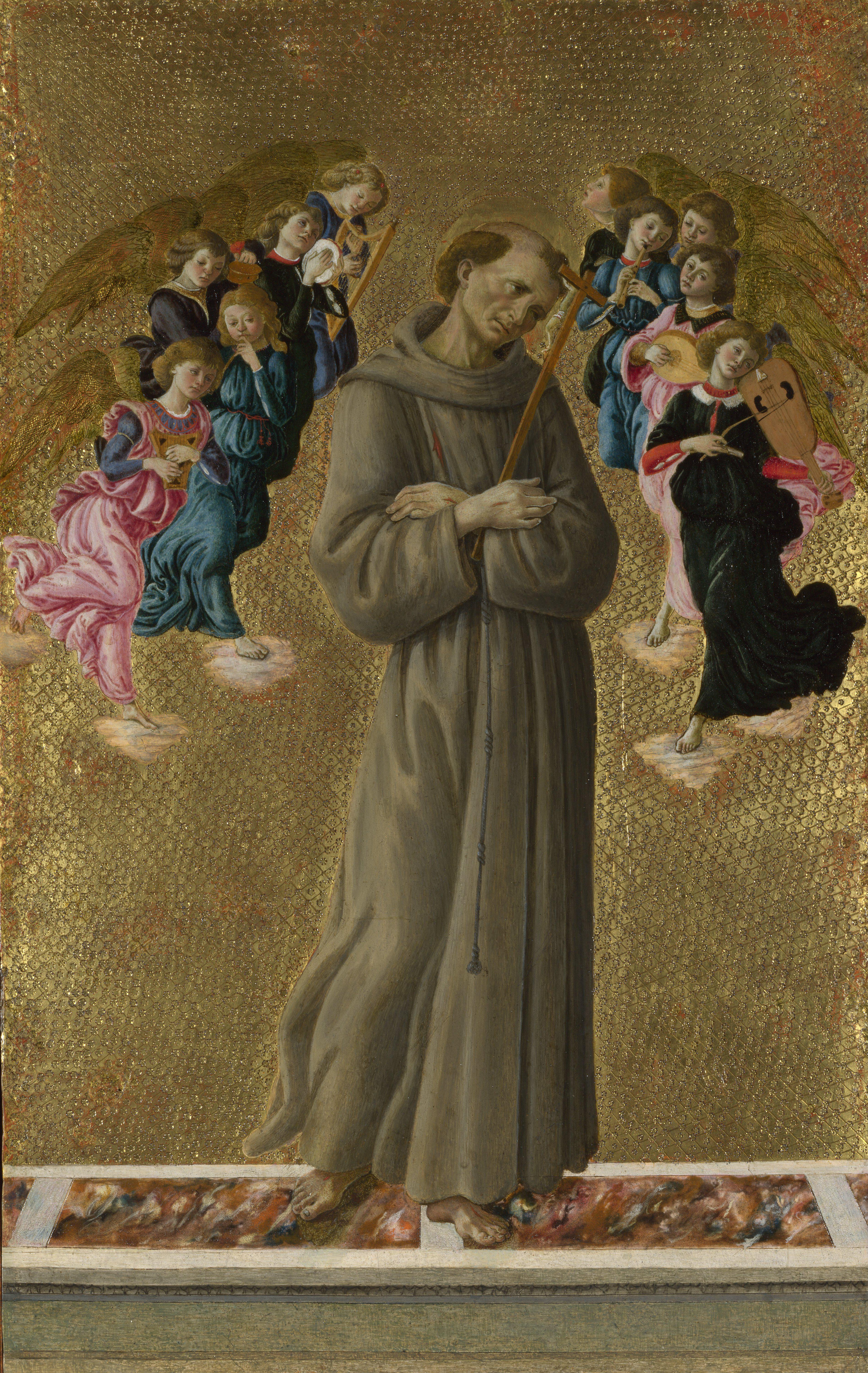
Saint Francis of Assisi with Angels by Sandro Botticelli, now in the National Gallery in London

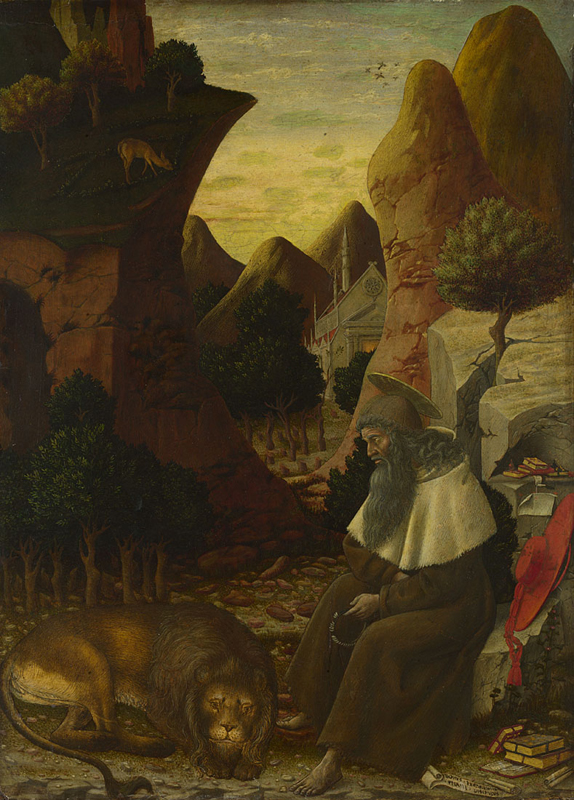
Saint Jerome in a Landscape by Bono da Ferrara, ca. 1440, now in the National Gallery

The Costabili collection or Costabili Gallery was a large art collection in Ferrara in the 19th century, mainly consisting of Ferrarese art. Works from the collection were purchased by mid and late 19th-century art collectors like Giovanni Morelli, Austen Henry Layard and Charles Eastlake, eventually ending in many of the major collections of art around the world. A significant group of paintings ended up in the National Gallery in London.

== History ==
The collection was created by Marchese Giovanni Battista Costabili Contain and continued by his grand-nephew Marchese Giovanni Costabili Contain. By the late 1850s, the collection was deteriorating, with many works in poor condition, and Marchese started selling works to pay off his debts. His son Marchese Alfonso Costabili Contain eventually sold the remainder of the collection in 1885.

The Costabili collection also included a library with some 400 manuscripts, 400 incunables, and 800 books from the Aldine Press. It was sold in four sales in 1858 and 1859.

== Selected works ==
- Still life with plates by Paolo Antonio Barbieri, sold by Sotheby's in 2008 for $181,000.
- Saint Francis by Sandro Botticelli, now in the National Gallery
- Deposizione by Baldassarre Carrari the Elder
- Santa Caterina martirizzata by Michele Coltellini, now in the Musée Jacquemart-André
- Saint Sebastian by Lorenzo Costa, now in the Gemäldegalerie Alte Meister
- Saint Jerome by Bono da Ferrara, now in the National Gallery
- Madonna in adoration of the Christ Child by Ortolano Ferrarese, now in the Philadelphia Museum of Art
- Madonna and Child with the Donor, Pietro de' Lardi, Presented by Saint Nicholas by Master G.Z., now in the Metropolitan Museum of Art
- Unidentified work by Ludovico Mazzolino, now in the Wawel Castle in Poland
- Madonna and Child; Saint John the Baptist; Saint Jerome by Sano di Pietro, now in the Metropolitan Museum of Art
- Virgin and Child with Saints George and Anthony by Pisanello, now in the National Gallery
- Unidentified work by Ercole Setti, now in the Galleria Estense
- Saint Bernardino by Benvenuto Tisi, now in the Alberto Saibene collection in Milan, and two other saints and a The Madonna and Child enthroned with Saints John the Baptist and Peter and an Angel holding back a Curtain by the same painter
- Saint Jerome by Cosimo Tura, now in the National Gallery, and a Portrait of a Young Man in the Metropolitan Museum of Art
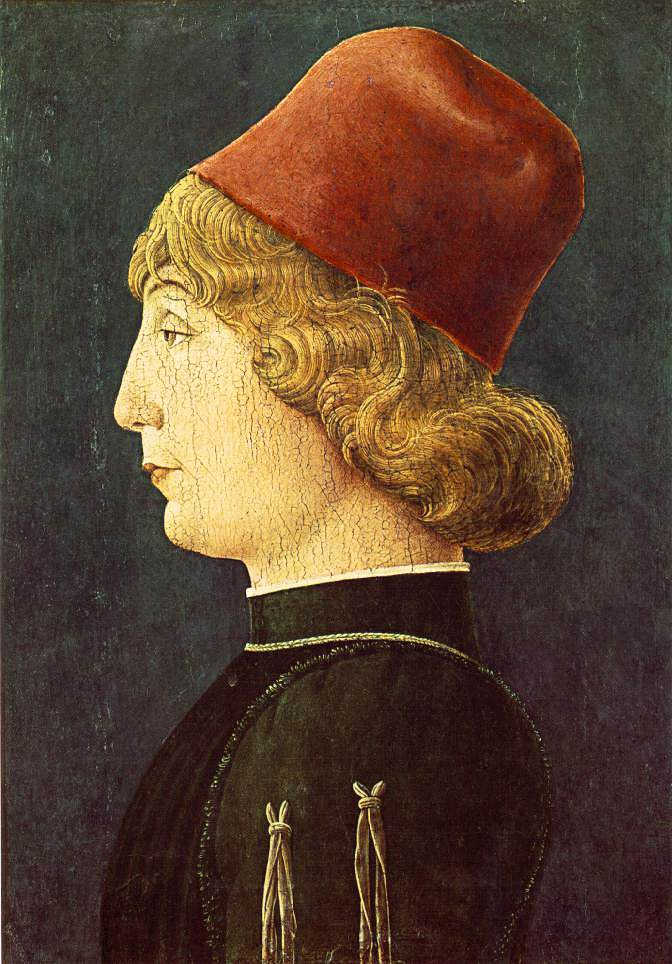
Portrait of a Young Man by Cosimo Tura

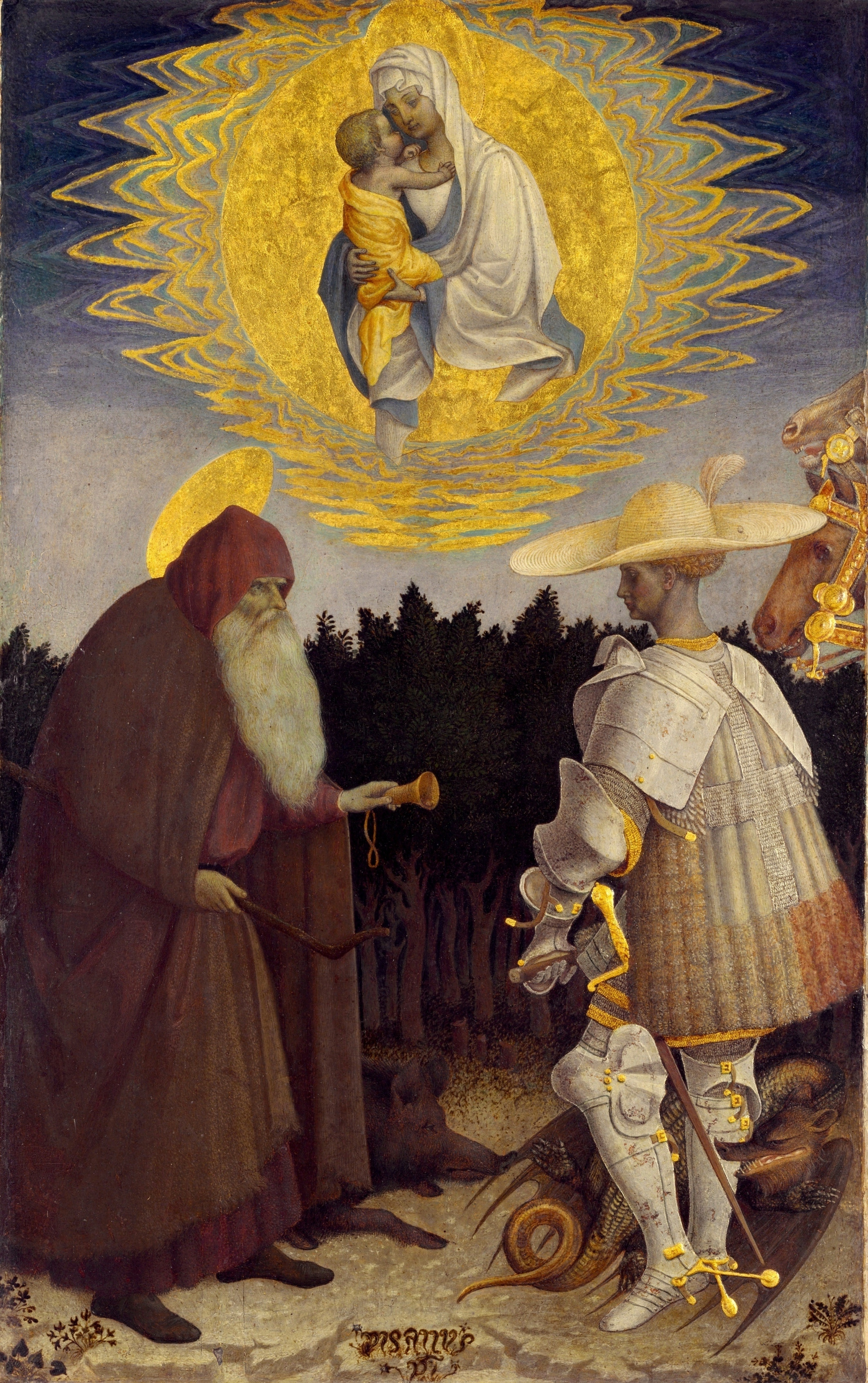
Virgin and Child with Saints George and Anthony by Pisanello
