= Contri =

Contri is an Italian surname. Notable people with the surname include:

- Antonio Contri (before 1701–1731), Italian Baroque painter
- Fernanda Contri (1935–2025), Italian jurist and politician
- Gianfranco Contri (born 1970), Italian cyclist
- Pat Contri (born 1980), American youtuber and writer
