= Jacopo Ripanda =

Italian painter

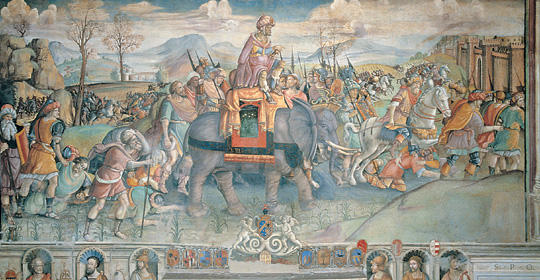
Hannibal's crossing of the Alps, one of Ripanda's frescoes for the Palazzo dei Conservatori.

Jacopo Ripanda (Bologna, 15th century - Rome, c.1516) was an Italian painter of the Renaissance era.

His works were mainly undertaken in his home town of Bologna, and in Rome, as a result of his numerous papal commissions for frescoes in churches and Vatican palaces.

== Early work ==
Little is known of the life and work of this painter, though he was highly admired in his lifetime. He was probably born in Bologna in the second half of the fifteenth century, from which the artist must have left at a fairly young age to travel to Rome during the pontificate of Pope Alexander VI, to study the ancient remains. His great interest in Roman antiquity led him to detailed observation of Trajan's Column, which he documented precisely using a viewing device to observe the detail of farthermost friezes. This apparatus caused a great deal of discussion and made Ripanda famous. As a result of his optical device, he was able to produce numerous detailed drawings of the designs. These were published as engravings in 1576 by Girolamo Muziano.

== Frescoes and later work ==
The fame of these works was enough to attract the patronage of the Pope and other church officials. Alexander bought the Trajan's column designs, and also entrusted Ripanda with the task of painting four rooms depicting scenes from classical history, inside the Palazzo dei Conservatori, on the Capitoline Hill. The paintings in the Sala di Annibale and the Sala della Lupa still exist. In 1505-7 Ripanda painted chiaroscuro frescoes depicting the lives of Julius Caesar and Trajan. These formed part of the palace of Cardinal Fazio Santorio (now the Palazzo Doria-Pamphili). However, these paintings no longer survive. Ripanda's Vatican commissions were cancelled by Pope Alexander's successor Pope Julius II. However, he apparently executed decorations for the funeral of Julius in 1513. His last known work is a sketchbook dated 1516, which is presumed to be around the date of his death.

== Style ==
According to the Grove Dictionary of Art, Ripanda's style is "basically Emilian, influenced by Ercole Grandi and Lorenzo Costa, but adapted to the style of painters such as Bernardo Pinturicchio and Girolamo Genga."

Sources of the period suggest that his work was most admired for his ability to document in accurate detail numerous classical motifs. His work influenced Baldassare Peruzzi's own chiaroscuro frescoes of the life of Trajan in the episcopal palace of Ostia.
