= Giovanni Monti =

Italian painter

Giovanni Monti (7 May 1765 – 1 June 1825) was an Italian landscape painter, mainly active in Ferrara and Rome. He was born in Maiano near Fusignano and was a nephew of the poet Vincenzo Monti. Some of his works were acquired by the Ateneo de Ferrara, and two small tondi by Monti were included in the Costabili collection. He should not be confused with two earlier Italian painters, Giovanni Battista Monti of Genoa (died 1657) or Giovanni Giacomo Monti of Bologna (born 1692).

== Sources ==
- Laderchi, Camillo. La pittura ferrarese: memorie, Ferrara: Abram Servadio Editore, 1856, p. 184.
- Mattaliano, Emanuele. La collezione Costabili, Venezia: Marsilio; Ferrara: Fondazione Cassa di risparmio di Ferrara, 1998, pp. 13, 117.
