= The Vestal Claudia Towing the Ship Bearing the Statue of Cybele =

Painting by Benvenuto Tisi

- La vestale Claudia Quinta traina la nave con la statua di Cibele
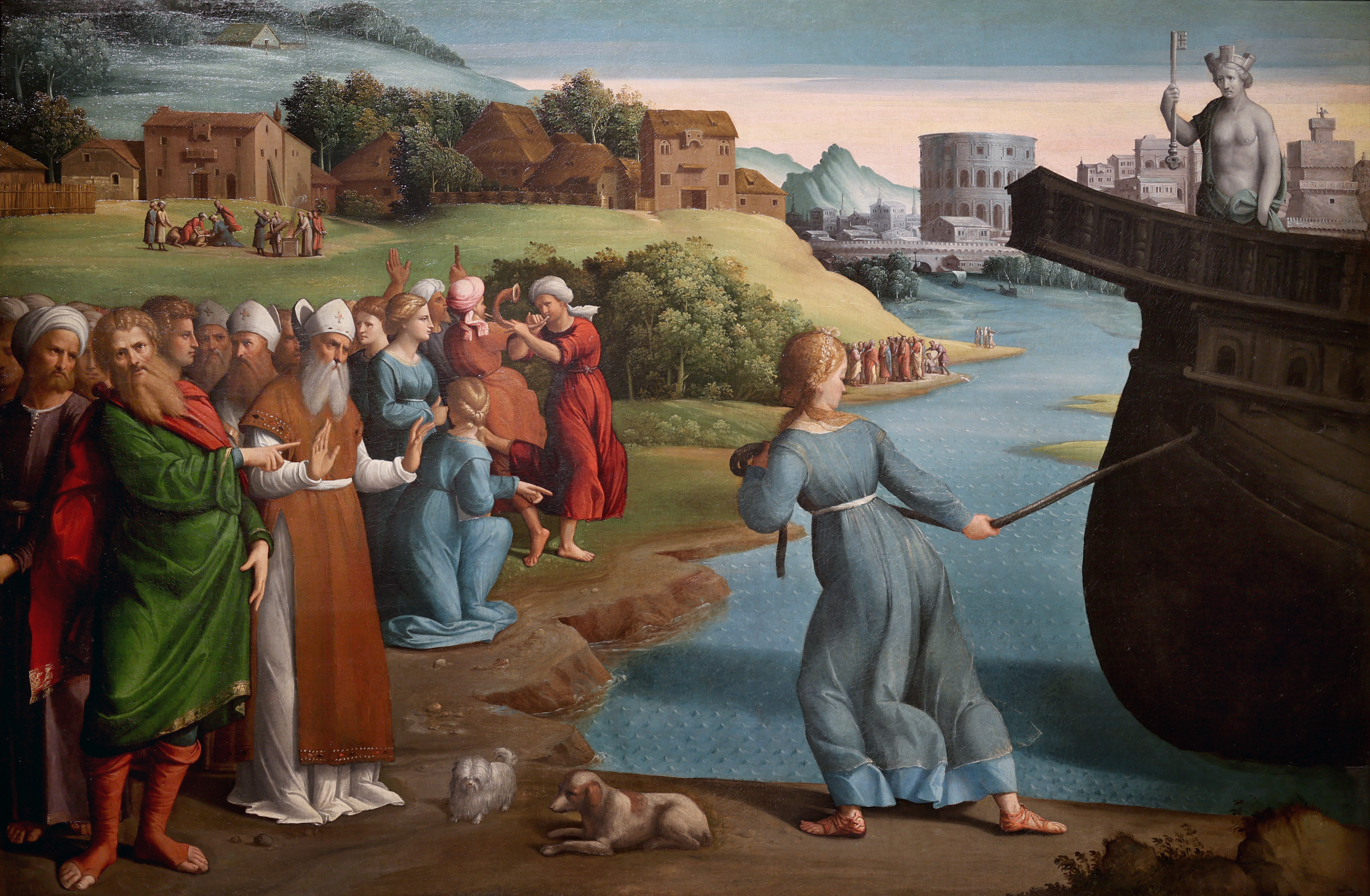
- Artist: Benvenuto Tisi (il Garofalo)
- Year: circa 1535
- Medium: Oil on canvas
- Dimensions: 129 cm × 195 cm (51 in × 77 in)
- Location: Galleria Nazionale d'Arte Antica, Rome

The Vestal Claudia Towing the Ship Bearing the Statue of Cybele is a painting by the Italian Renaissance painter Benvenuto Tisi (il Garofalo) in the Galleria Nazionale d'Arte Antica at Palazzo Barberini in Rome, Italy.

== Description ==
The painting celebrates a semi-historic event occurring in Rome at the end of the Second Punic War. Rome, stymied in its pursuit of outright victory, and assailed by poor harvests and other misfortunes, had sought the blessings of a new mother goddess (Cybele) by purchasing a venerable sculpture in Phrygia (Asia Minor). However, as narrated in the Fasti by Ovid, the omens became nefarious when the ship porting the statue up the Tiber to Rome became grounded in a sandbar of the river. Claudia Quinta, a Roman Matron, later identified as a Vestal Virgin, prayed to Cybele for prodigious strength, and was able to wrench the boat from its marooned state, and tow the boat to the city, which the new goddess showered with fortune.

Such classical conceits were common artistic subjects in the court of Ferrara of this period, where il Garofano worked. The artist is known for painting allegories and classical scenes. At Claudia's feet two dogs represent loyalty, while a crowd of men watch in amazement at her miraculous feat. In the background is an imaginary depiction of Rome.
