= Stefano Falzagalloni =

Italian painter

Stefano Falzagalloni (c. 1480 – 1551) was an Italian painter, active in his Ferrara.

Corrado Ricci thought he imitated or passed off his works as those of his master, il Garofalo.
