= Ercole Grandi =

Italian painter

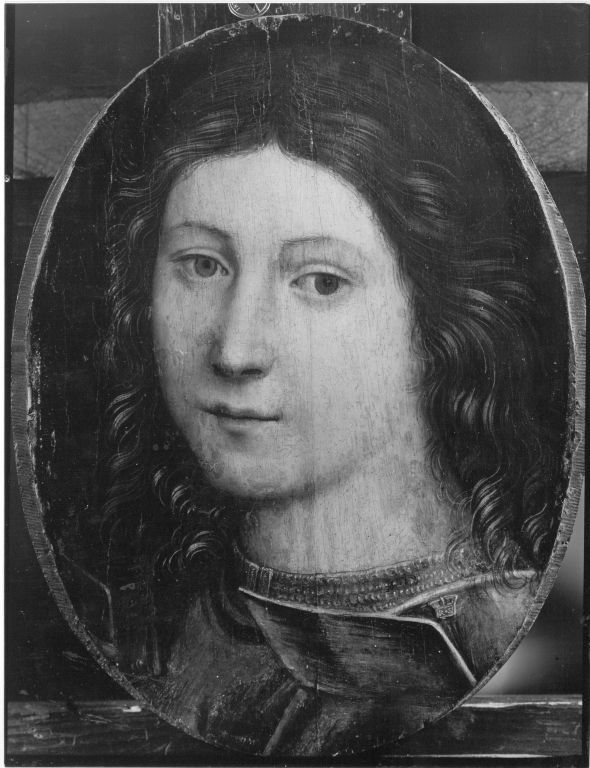
Ercole Grandi

Ercole Grandi (c. 1463–before 1 November 1525) was an Italian painter of the early-Renaissance period, active mainly in Ferrara. Also known as Ercole da Ferrara and Ercole di Giulio Cesare Grandi, he has been claimed to be a favourite pupil of the painter Lorenzo Costa. Ercole Grandi first appeared in the historical record as being in the service of the house of Este in 1489. Between 1489 and 1495, Ercole Grandi seems to have been working in Bologna, both in San Petronio and in the Cappella Bentivoglio of San Giacomo Maggiore, as an assistant to Lorenzo Costa. In 1495, he was in Ferrara as the chief architect for realising Duke Ercole's plans to embellish the city and renovate the churches; the facade and interior of Santa Maria in Vado were executed from his design. He worked with Ludovico Mazzolino and others on the decoration of the Castello, and painted in the apartments of Lucretia Borgia. Also in Ferrara, he painted the frescoes for the church of San Pietro Martire (now demolished), although some frescoes are preserved. One problem in assigning attribution to the hand of Ercole Grandi is that none of his works is signed or dated, or accompanied by supporting documents, but he is thought by some scholars to have painted—in the manner of Mantegna—or had a hand in, the decorative frescoed ceiling in the Sala del Tesoro of the Palazzo Costabili (Palazzo di Ludovico il Moro) in Ferrara between 1503 and 1506. Other scholars attribute the work to Benvenuto Tisi da Garofalo. Confusingly, the identity of Ercole Grandi is sometimes conflated with Garofalo, and an Ercole da Bologna, and (most famously by the Renaissance historian, Giorgio Vasari) with that of Ercole di Antonio Roberti or Ercole de' Roberti (and see Filippini), who was first documented as being in Ferrara in 1479, and was author of the great frescoes of the Garganelli chapel in Bologna. Most of Ercole Grandi's works have been reattributed to other Ferrarese painters, such as Giovan Francesco Maineri and Lorenzo Costa, while other scholars insist that Ercole Grandi is a mythical character.
