= Gelasio di Nicoló =

Gelasio di Nicoló was an Italian painter of the School of Ferrara active in the 13th century.

== Life ==
Only fragmentary evidence remains on his life and birth. Azzo VII d'Este, lord of Ferrara, commissioned a painting of The Fall of Phaeton from him in 1242. The bishop of Ferrara Filippo Fontana also commissioned from him an image of the Madonna and a gonfalone of Saint George, the city's patron saint.
