= Niccolò Pisano =

Italian painter

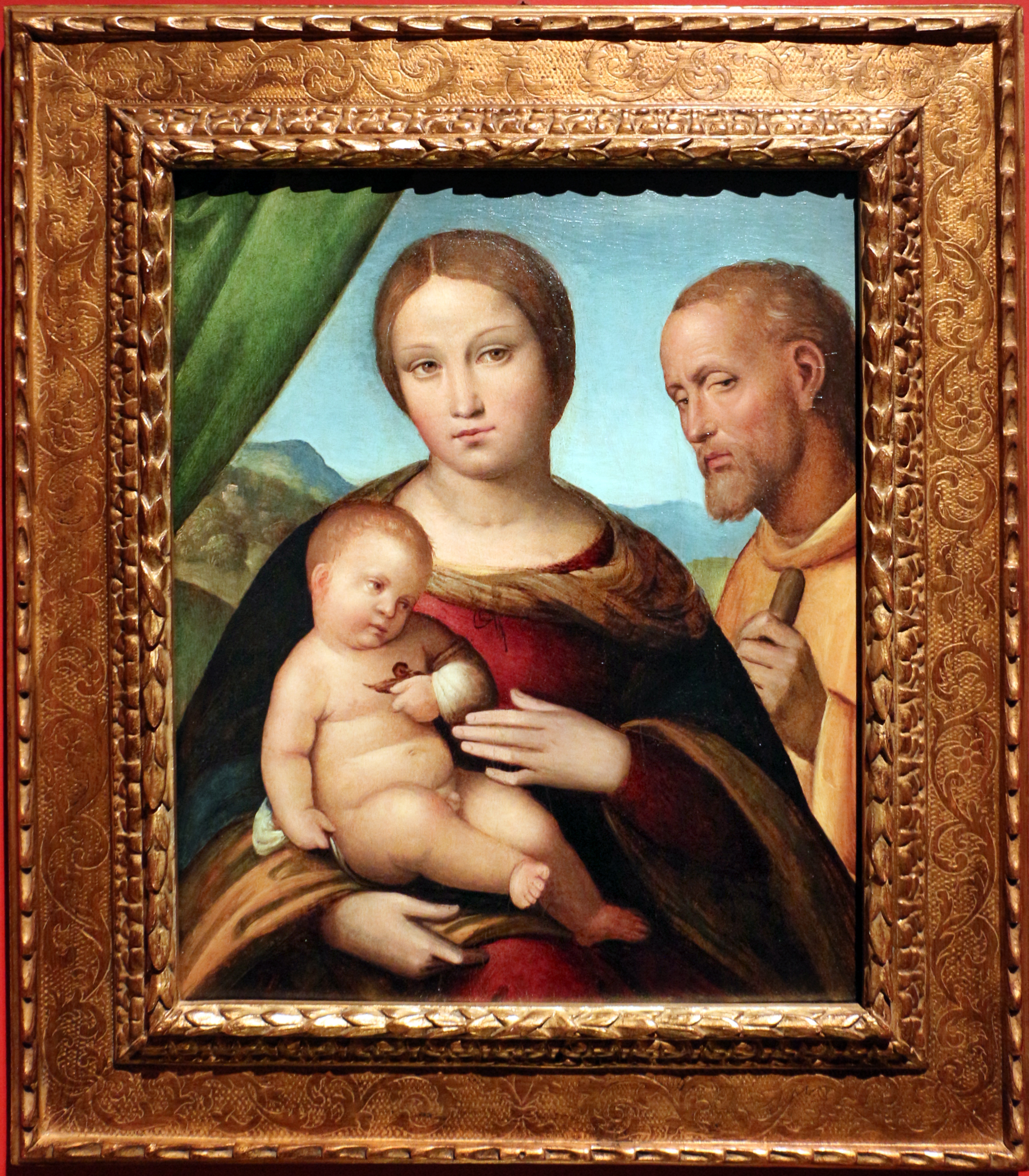
Holy Family, Fondazione Cavallini Sgarbi

Niccolò Pisano or Niccolò dell'Abbrugia (15 March 1470 - after 1536) was an Italian painter.

== Life ==
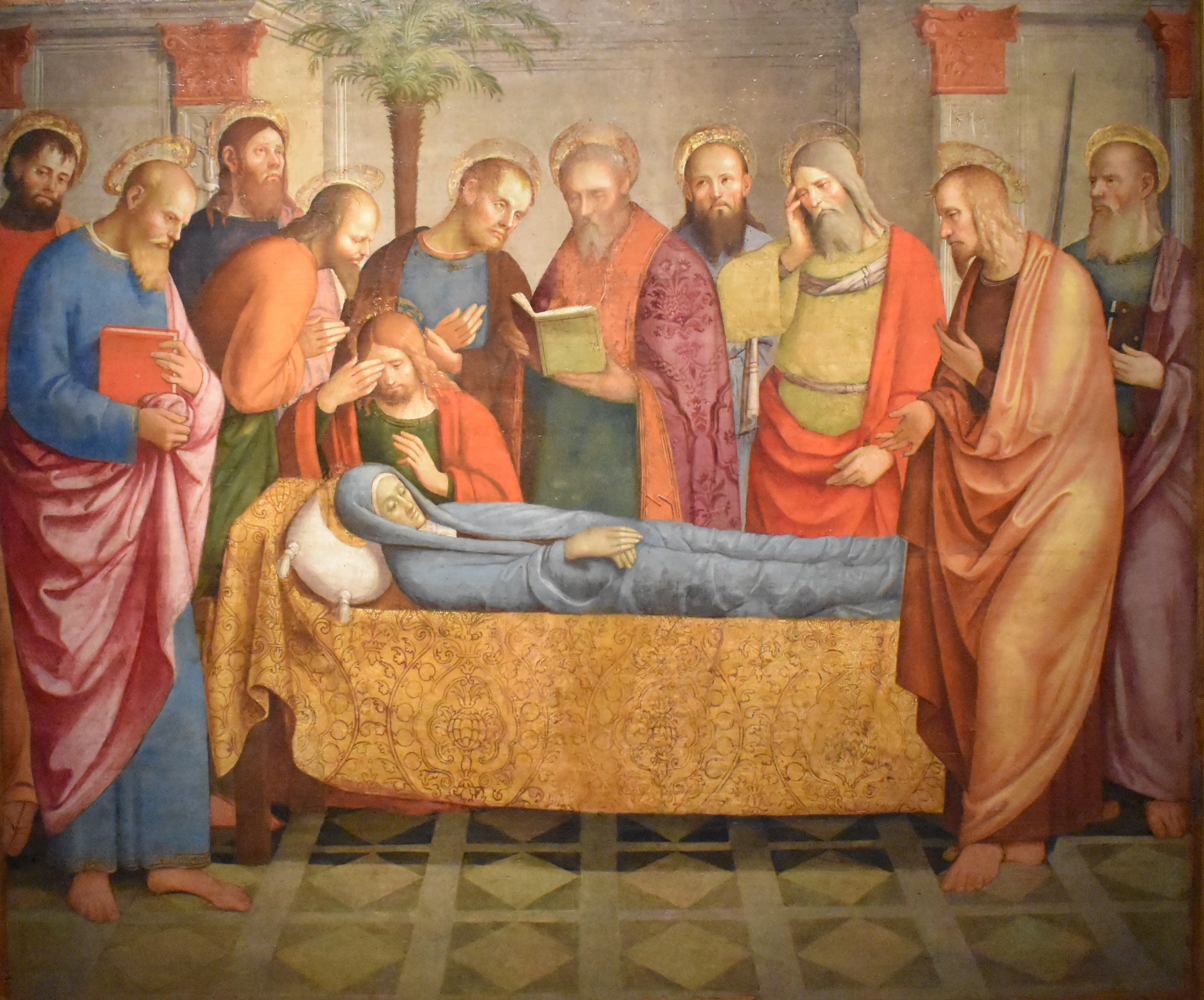
Death of the Virgin Mary, San Cristoforo alla Certosa, Ferrara

Born in Pisa, at a very young age he became an assistant to Pietro Perugino at the Sistine Chapel. Returning to Pisa, he produced the first of his autograph works, including the altarpiece Enthroned Madonna with Angels and Saints (1493, Museo nazionale di San Matteo) and its now-split-up predella showing The Adoration of the Magi and The Massacre of the Innocents. He also contributed to the paintings of the apsidal semi-dome at Pisa Cathedral.

Next he was summoned to Ferrara by duke Alfonso I d'Este, spending most of his career there and in Bologna. He, Lorenzo Costa and Niccolò Rossetti collaborated to paint Ferrara Cathedral and other churches. Pisano's Holy Family (Uffizi) and his other works from this period show that he had absorbed the style of the School of Ferrara, sweetened by a contemplative composition drawing on his old master Perugino and the innovations of Raphael.

He also produced several altarpieces for Bologna and its surrounding towns such as Budrio, including a Deposition and a Madonna and Child with Angel Musicians and Saints John the Evangelist, Eleutropius and Petronius. He returned to Pisa during the last part of his life, working for the Cathedral again (The Punishment of Aaron's Sons, 1535) and dying in the city.
