= Adoration of the Magi (Garofalo) =

Painting by Benvenuto Tisi da Garofalo

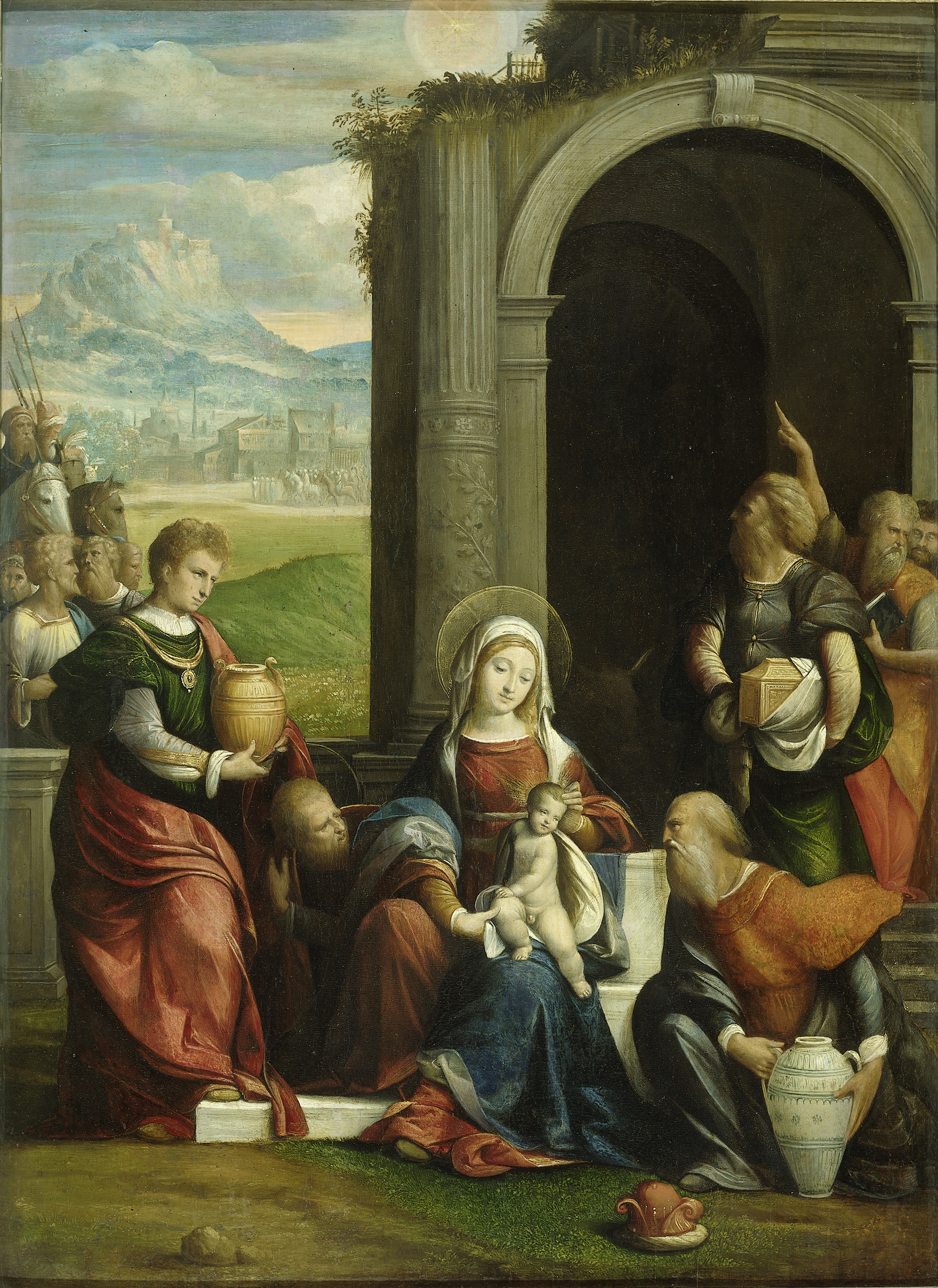
- Artist: Benvenuto Tisi da Garofalo
- Year: circa 1530s
- Medium: Oil on panel
- Dimensions: 79 cm × 58 cm (31 in × 23 in)
- Location: Rijksmuseum; Amsterdam

Adoration of the Magi is a 1530s oil on panel painting by the Italian renaissance artist Benvenuto Tisi in the collection of the Rijksmuseum.

== Painting ==
Mary sits with her child in front of ruined columns receiving gifts in a fantasy landscape. On the right a man points to the Star of Bethlehem.

== Exhibitions ==
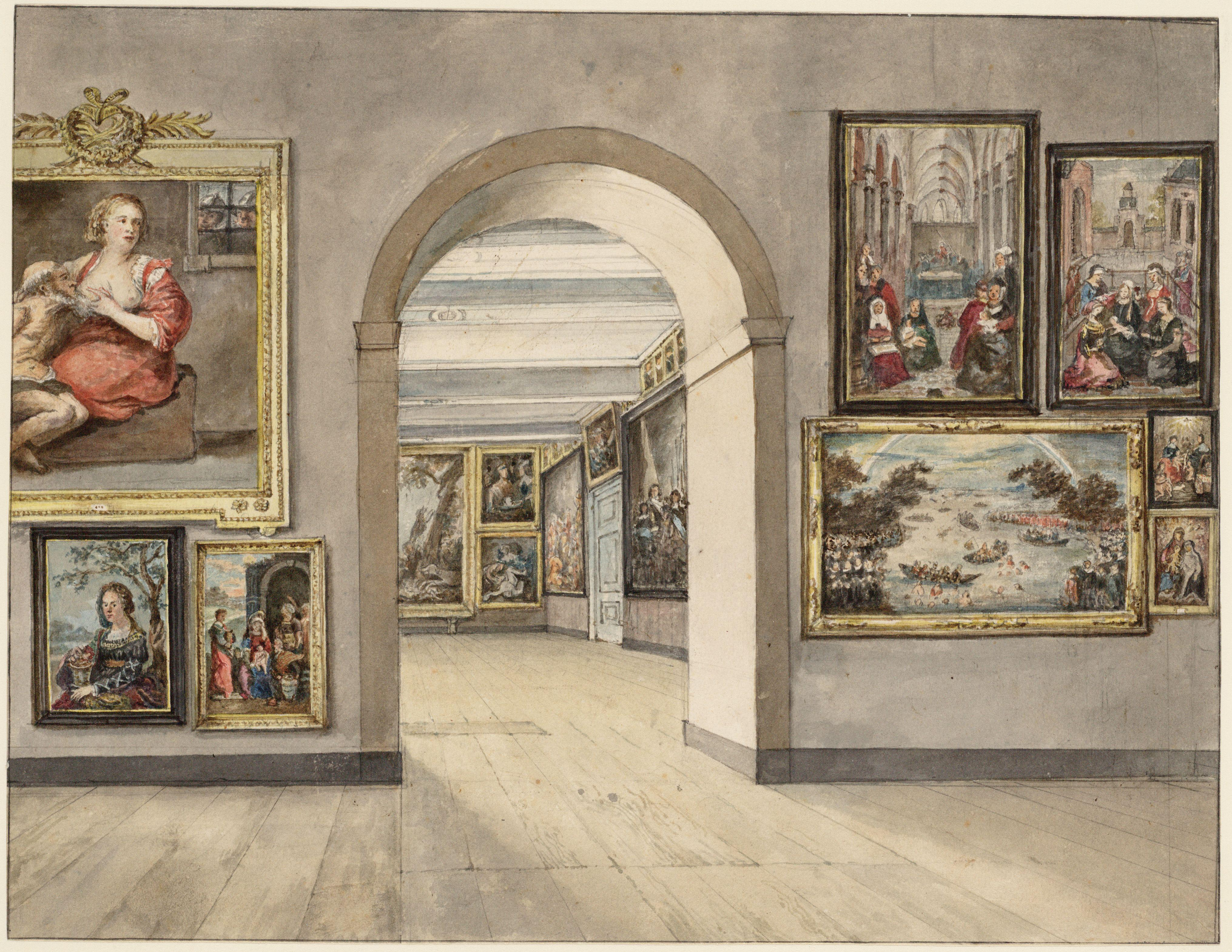
This painting can be seen hanging in a 19th-century sketch of the gallery of the Trippenhuis before the collection was moved to its present location in 1885

This painting has been considered a highlight of the collection since it was acquired in 1823 by William I of the Netherlands from the estate of Edmund Bourke in Paris and given to the Trippenhuis museum. It has been included in all Highlights of the Rijksmuseum catalogs since.
