= Galasso Galassi =

Italian painter

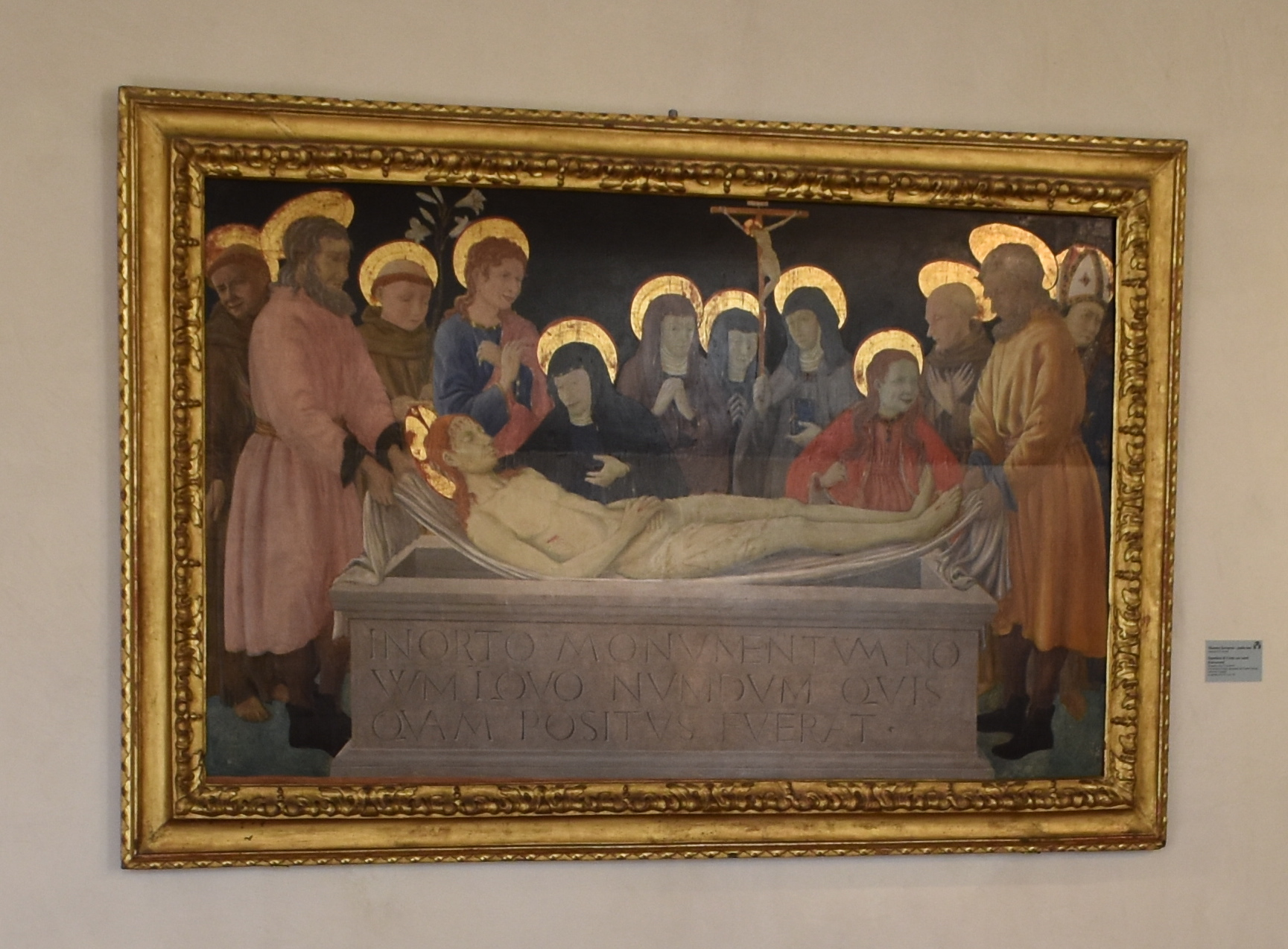
Deposizione di Cristo, Pinacoteca Nazionale in Ferrara

Galasso Galassi (active 1450–1488) was an Italian painter of the early-Renaissance period, active mainly in Ferrara. He also worked for some years in Bologna. He was one of the earliest painters of the School of Ferrara.
