= Renaissance in Emilia =

Aspects of Renaissance art and culture in Emilia

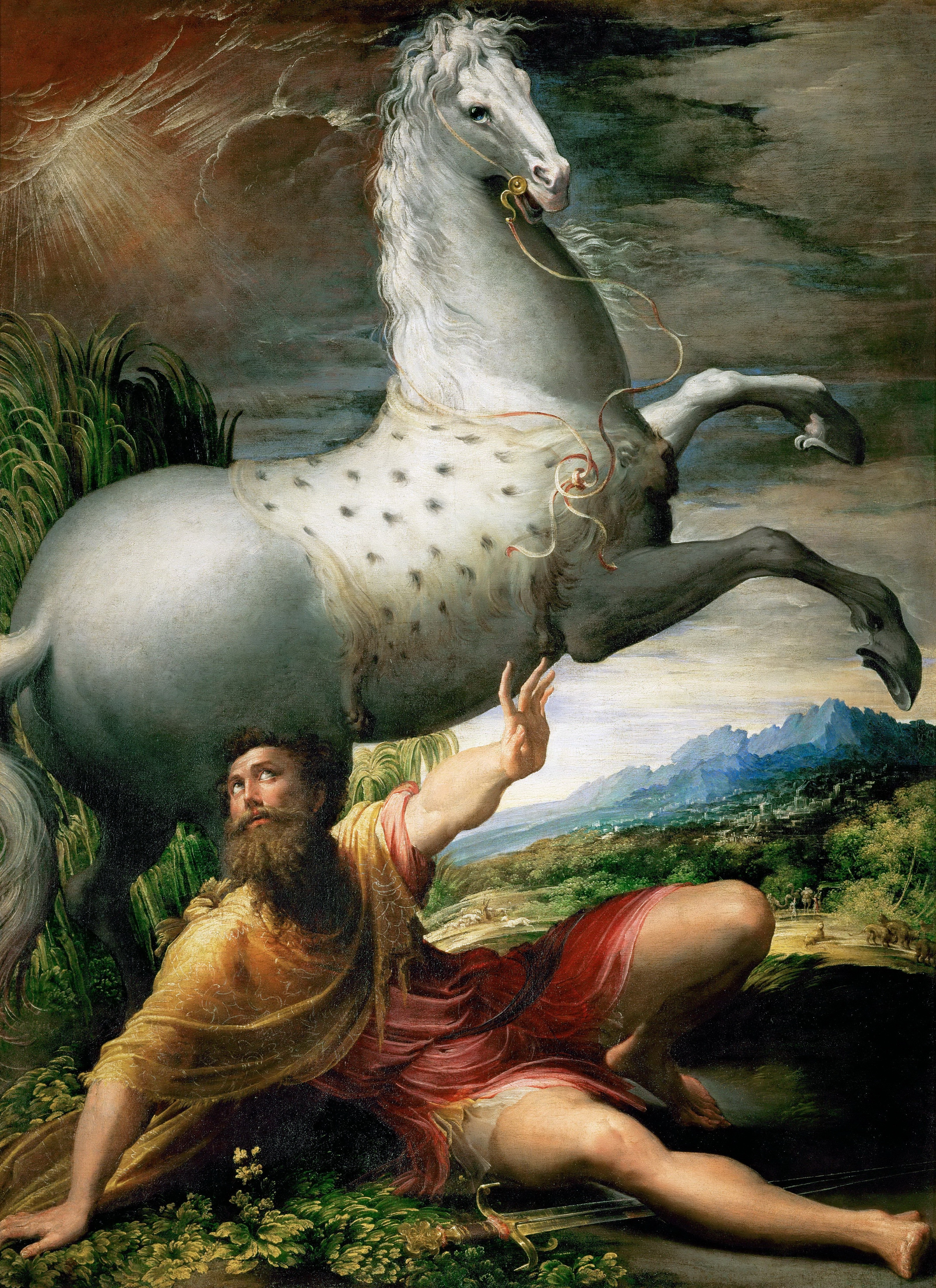
Parmigianino, The Conversion of Saint Paul (c. 1527-1528)

The Renaissance in Emilia concerns multiple realities in a dense network of exchanges with all the surrounding areas. In the fifteenth and sixteenth centuries, Emilia was fractured into several lordships, among which Ferrara of the Este, Bologna of the Bentivoglio, and Parma of the Farnese became known as art centers.

== Ferrara ==
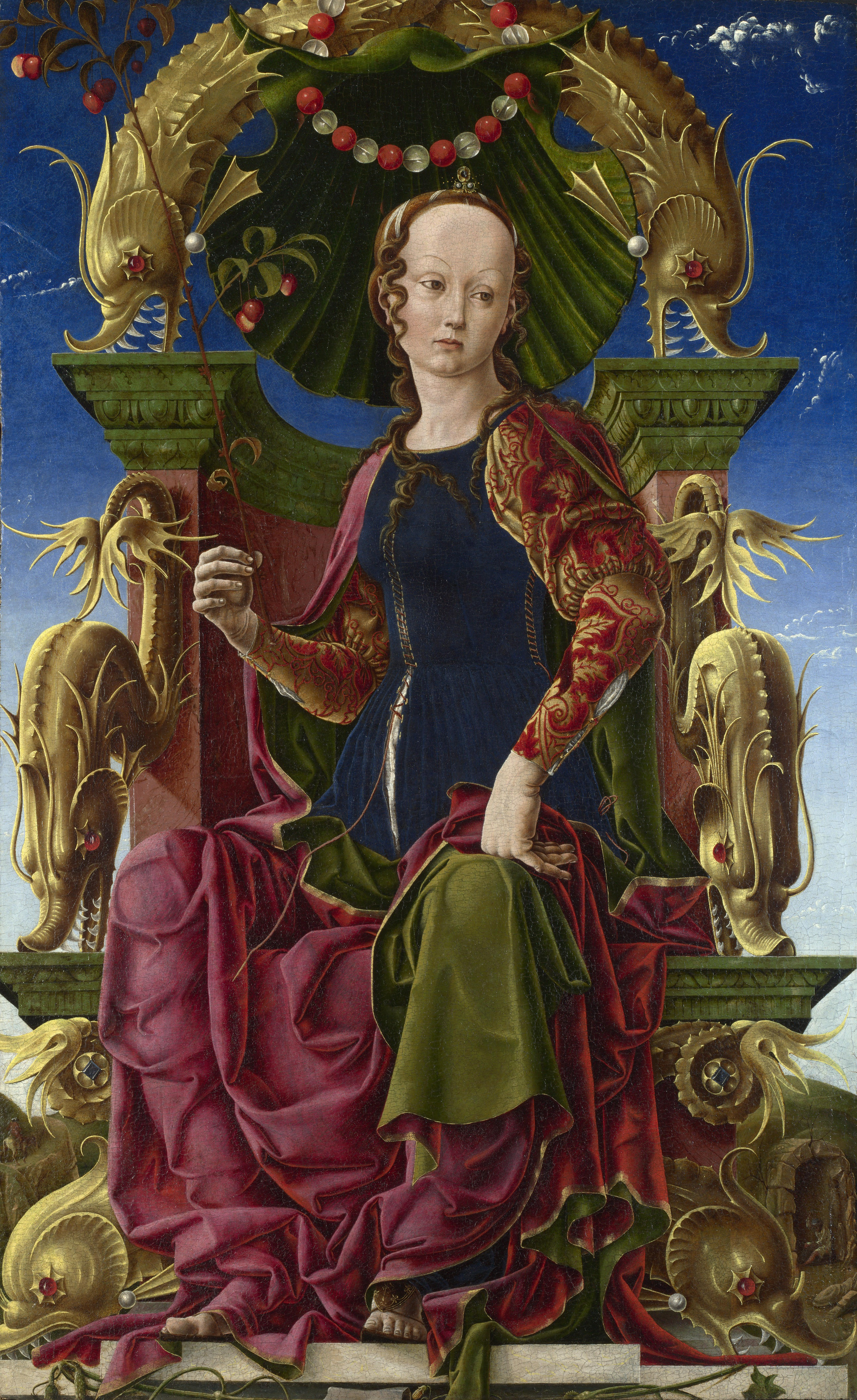
Cosmè Tura, Calliope (1460)

Ferrara made it possible for varied artists to meet at the Este court, from Pisanello to Leon Battista Alberti, from Jacopo Bellini to Piero della Francesca, from the young Andrea Mantegna to foreigners such as Rogier van der Weyden and Jean Fouquet. During the era of Borso d'Este (in power from 1450 to 1471), the multiple artistic influences of the court were transformed into a distinctive style, especially in painting, characterized by linear tension and preciousness combined with expressiveness. The emergence of the School of Ferrara can be seen in the decorations of the Studiolo di Belfiore and developed in the frescoes of the Salone di Mesi in Palazzo Schifanoia, where the figures of Cosmè Tura and, later, Francesco del Cossa and Ercole de' Roberti emerged.

Even in the 16th century, Ferrara was confirmed as a demanding and avant-garde center regarding the arts. Alfonso d'Este was a patron of Raphael and Titian, while among local artists he brought out Garofalo and Dosso Dossi.

== Bologna ==
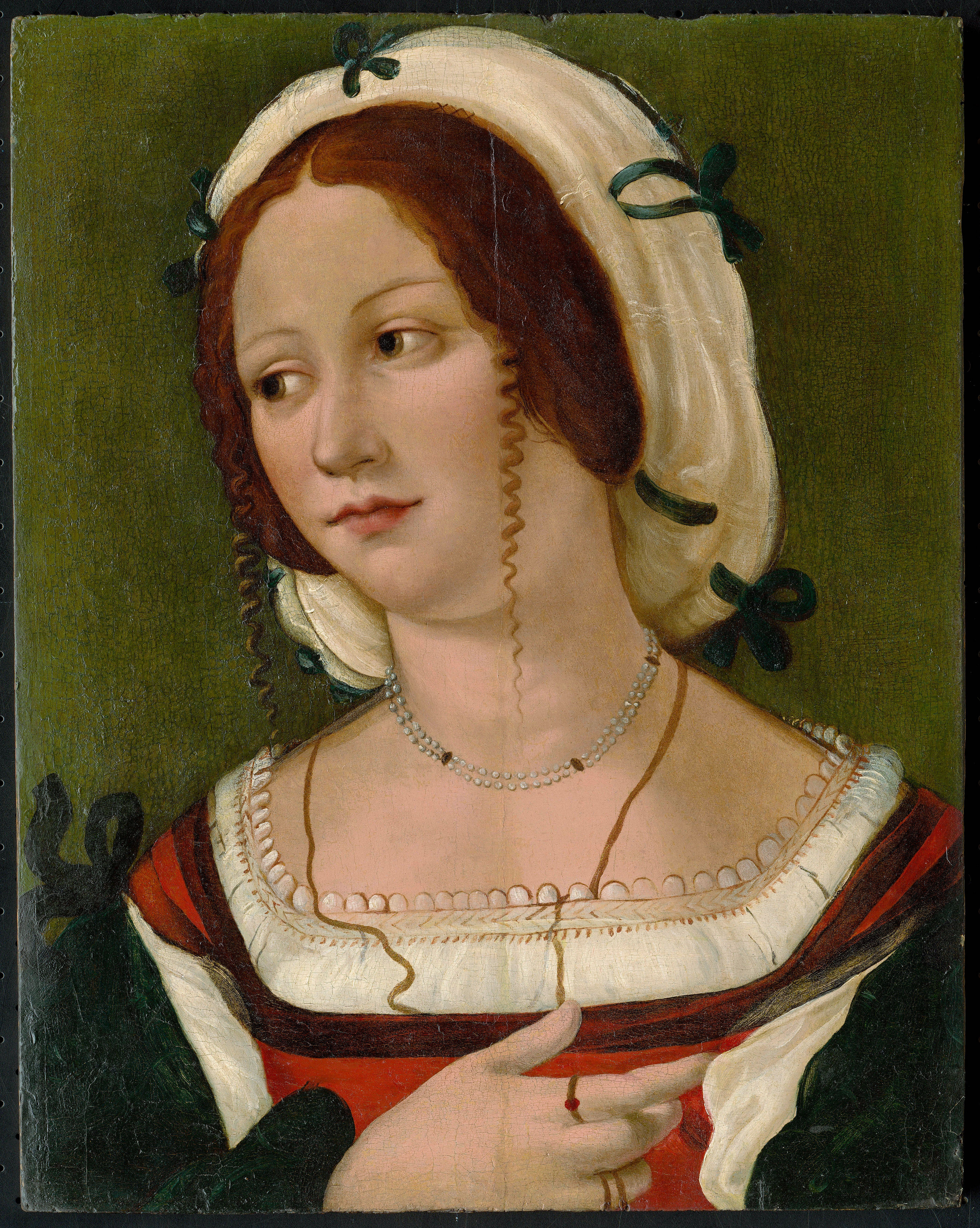
Possible portrait of Isabella d'Este, attributed to Francesco Francia, 1511

Bologna's University, the construction site of the Basilica of San Domenico, and the liberality of the Bentivoglio seigniory attracted humanists, artists, and other personalities, such as the mathematician Luca Pacioli, who would meet Albrecht Dürer in the city at the beginning of the 16th century.

Here studied Leon Battista Alberti and, between 1425 and 1434, Jacopo della Quercia left his masterpiece, the Porta Magna of the Basilica of San Petronio. In the 1470s, the Ferrara-born Francesco del Cossa and Ercole de' Roberti worked in the city, completing, among other things, the Griffoni Polyptych and the Garganelli Chapel, works that had a particular influence on sculptors. Niccolò dell'Arca, active at the Arca di San Domenico, created a Lamentation over the Dead Christ (c. 1464), inspired by Burgundian art, the last Donatello, and, probably, the Ferrarese frescoes, of which only a few fragments remain today. However, in later sculptural groups by Guido Mazzoni of Modena, the tones are more conciliatory and conventional. In painting, too, after the return of Ercole de' Roberti to Ferrara, local artists relied on the more serene Umbrian-Florentine modes, for example in the work of Francesco Francia.

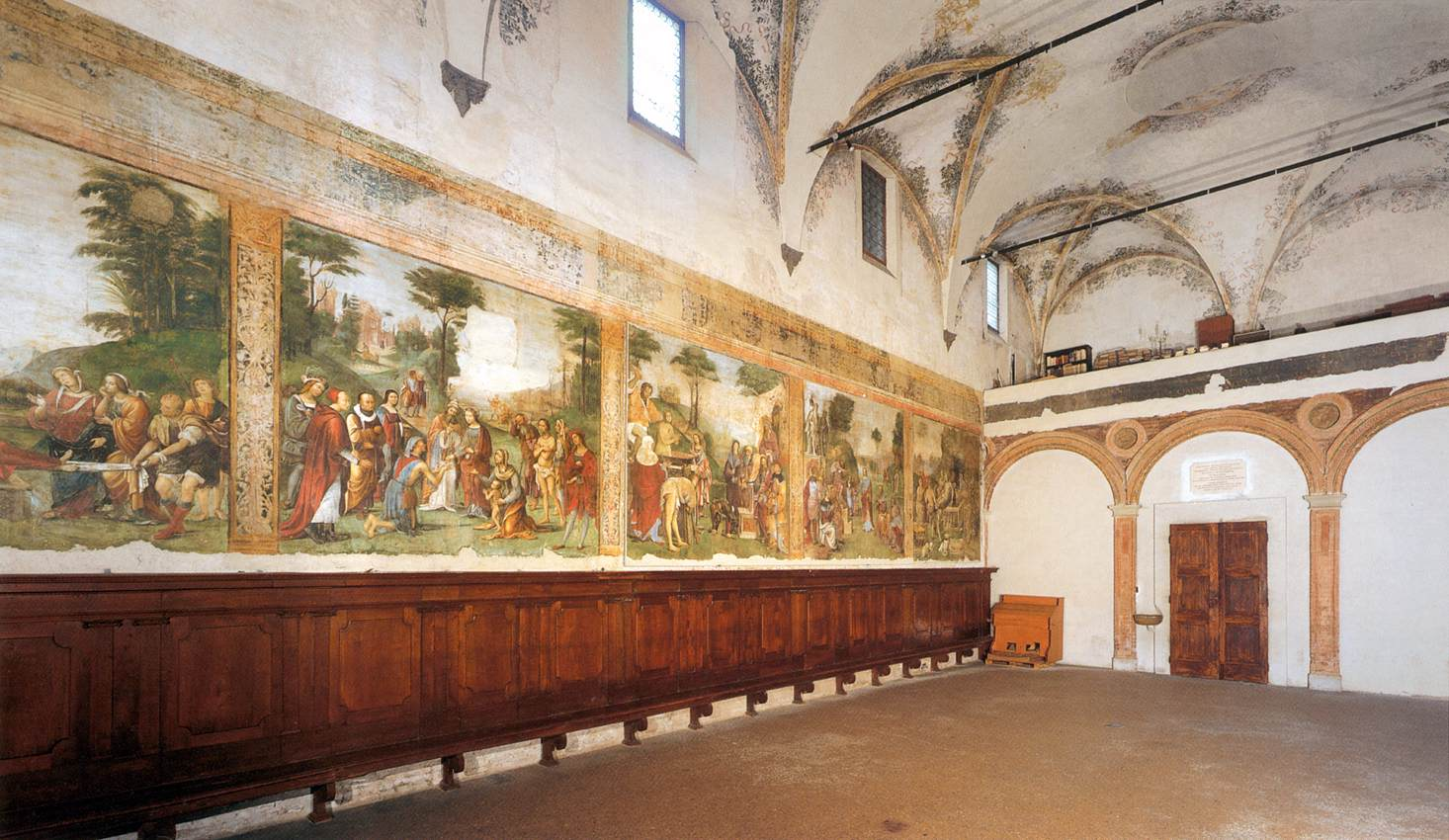
Saint Cecilia oratory in Bologna

In 1494-1495 the young exile Michelangelo stayed in Bologna, where, protected by the noble Giovan Francesco Aldovrandini, he found employment with the Dominican Order, for whom he made some statues for the Ark of San Domenico, where he anticipated the expressive graveness of some later masterpieces such as the David. Recent studies emphasize the importance of this period of residence in the formation of the artist, who studied the ways of representing the restrained energy and expressive variations of Jacopo della Quercia and the Ferrara works, drawing fundamental inspiration from them in the maturation of his own style. Already well established, he returned to Bologna in 1507-1508 to reconcile with Pope Julius II and create a bronze sculpture of the blessing pope, which was destroyed during the riots of 1511.

A Bolognese school was not organized until the 16th century when a group of artists worked on the frescoes in the oratory of Santa Cecilia (1504-1506). The young talents included Francesco Francia, Lorenzo Costa, and especially Amico Aspertini, author of a personal reinterpretation of Raphael.

== Parma ==
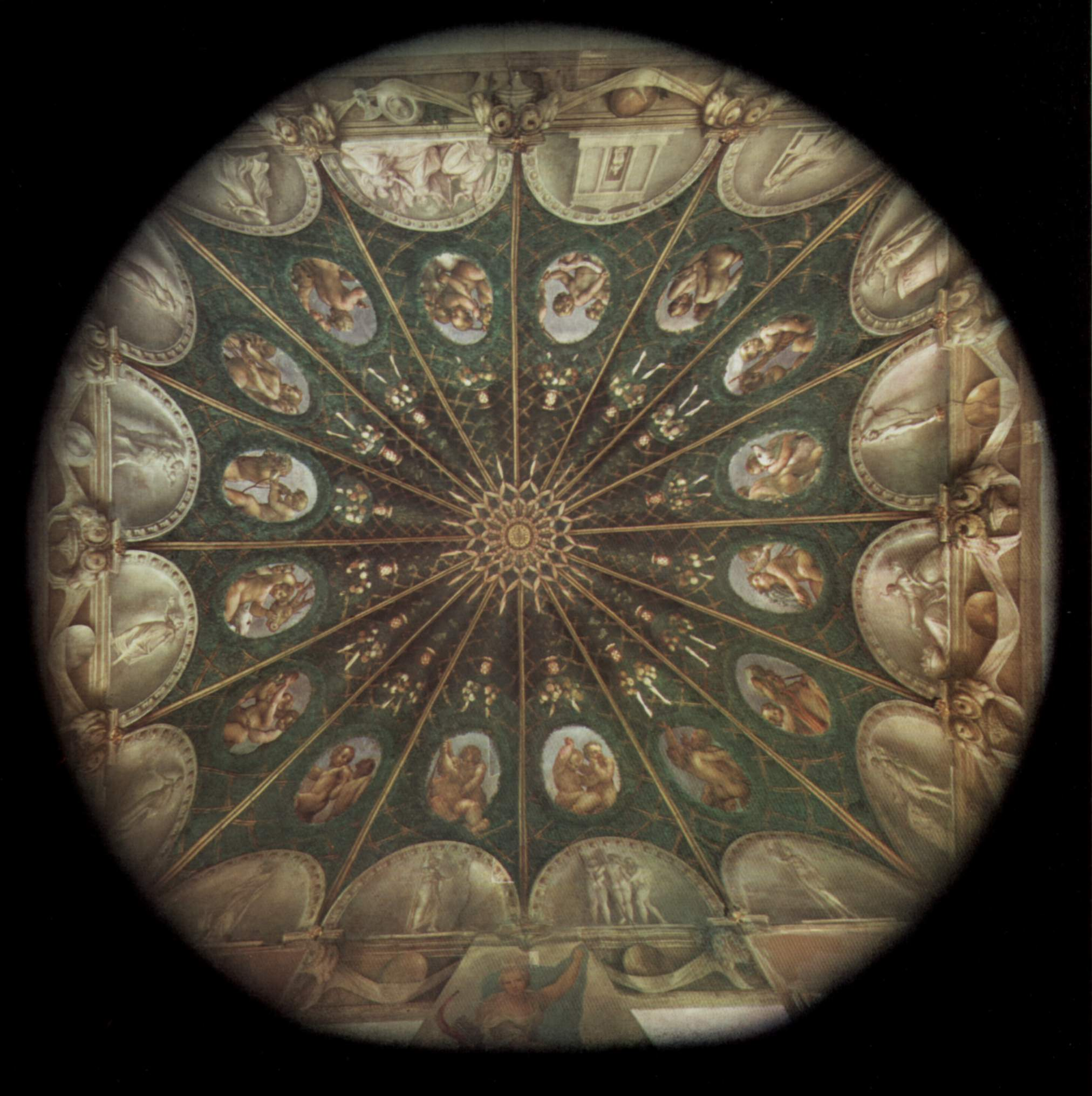
Correggio, Camera della Badessa (1519)

After a dormant 15th century, the new century brought on new figures and influences to Parma, with Filippo Mazzola, Correggio, and Parmigianino. The church of San Giovanni Evangelista, rebuilt in 1519, was decorated by Correggio and a team of young men who would later become well-known artists.

The career of Correggio was punctuated by three fresco cycles in Parma: the Camera della Badessa in the convent of San Paolo (1518), the decoration in the church of San Giovanni Evangelista (1520-1523), and the dome of Parma Cathedral with the Assumption (1526-1530). In these works, moving further and further away from fifteenth-century spatial rules, he implemented scenographic solutions that laid the groundwork, a century in advance, for Baroque decoration.

Parmigianino, on the other hand, was a more eclectic master, interested from his early years in graphics, optics, and alchemy. This interest shows in works such as the Self-portrait in a Convex Mirror (1524), with its very particular perceptive rendering. He favored tapered forms, polished and compact fields, and almost glazed color, with a sharp definition of forms, as opposed to the soft Correggio-style luminous intonation.

== See also ==
- Renaissance art
- Renaissance architecture
- School of Ferrara
- Bolognese school
- House of Este

== Bibliography ==
- De Vecchi, Pierluigi; Cerchiari, Elda (1999). I tempi dell'arte [The times of art] (in Italian). Vol. 2. Milan: Bompiani. ISBN 88-451-7212-0.
- Zuffi, Stefano (2004). Il Quattrocento [The 15th century] (in Italian). Milan: Electa. ISBN 8837023154.
- Zuffi, Stefano (2005). Il Cinquecento [The 16th century] (in Italian). Milan: Electa. ISBN 8837034687.
