= Baldassare Estense =

Italian painter

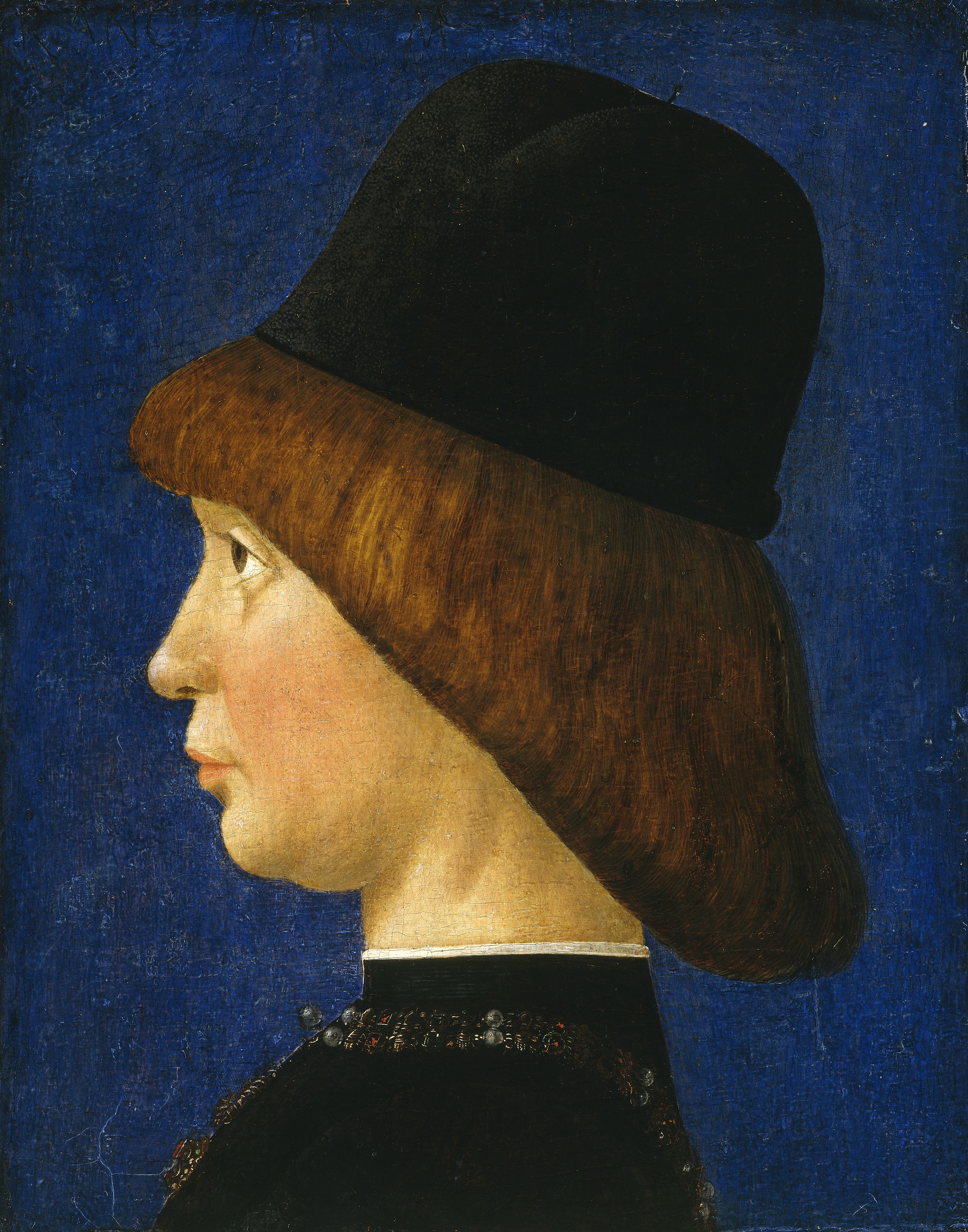
Francesco II Gonzaga, Marquess of Mantua, ca. 1474–1480, now in the National Gallery of Art

Baldassare Estense (ca. 1443 – after 1504) was an Italian painter.

He was born in Reggio, has been supposed to have been an illegitimate scion of the house of Este, since no mention of his father's name ever occurs in contemporary records, whilst he was called 'Estensis,' and received unusual promotion and rewards from the Dukes of Ferrara. He was a pupil of Cosimo Tura, and was also a medallist. In 1469 he painted the likeness of Borso I, and was ordered to present it in person to the Duke of Milan. From 1471 to 1504 he was a salaried officer at the court of Ferrara, living first in Castel Nuovo, for which he painted a canvas that has perished, and afterwards in Castel Tedaldo, of which he was the governor. In 1483 he painted the portrait of Tito Strozzi, now in the Costabili Gallery at Ferrara. His will, dated 1500, is in the archives of Ferrara, but the exact date of his death is unknown.

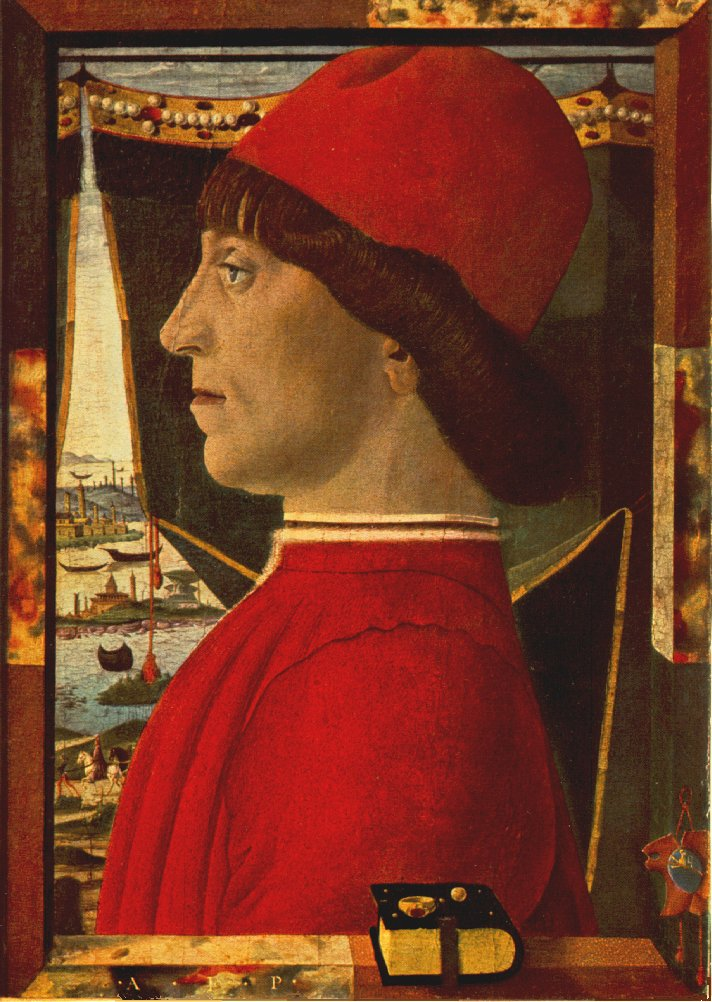
Portrait of a young man, now in the Museo Correr

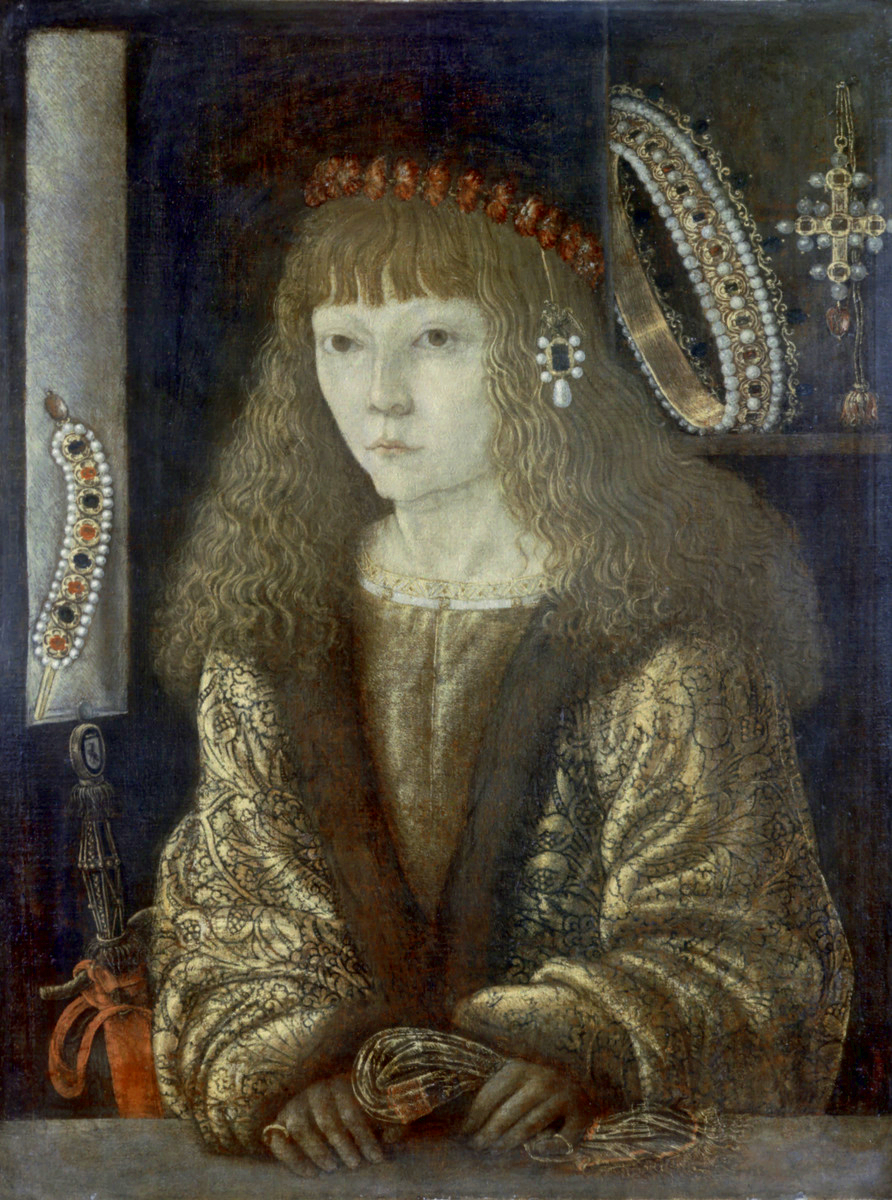
John Corvinus, 1486, now in the Alte Pinakothek
