= Michele Coltellini =

Italian painter (1480–1542)

Michele Coltellini (1480–1542) was an Italian painter, active mainly in Ferrara.

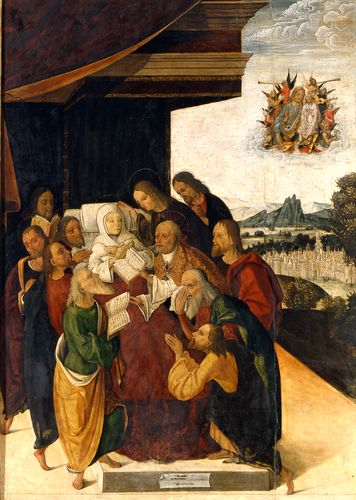
Death of the Virgin, 1502, now at Pinacoteca Nazionale (Bologna).

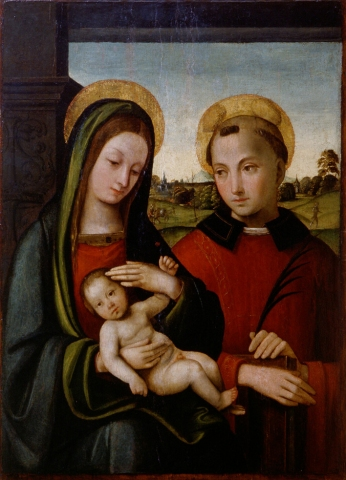
Virgin and Child with St Stefan

== Biography ==
He was a follower of Panetti and Garofalo, who lived in the 16th century. He is the author of a 'Dead Christ on the lap of the Virgin' in the Dresden Gallery, formerly assigned to Squarcione. His oldest panel is dated 1502, and represents the Death of the Virgin: it is now in the possession of Count Mazza, at Ferrara. In the church of Sant'Andrea, in the same city, is a Virgin and Child between SS Michael, Catharine, John, and Jerome, signed and dated 1506. The Gallery of Ferrara has a Madonna and Child and Saints, signed by him in 1542. The dates of his birth and death are uncertain.
