= Madonna and Child (Gentile da Fabriano, Ferrara) =

Painting by Gentile da Fabriano

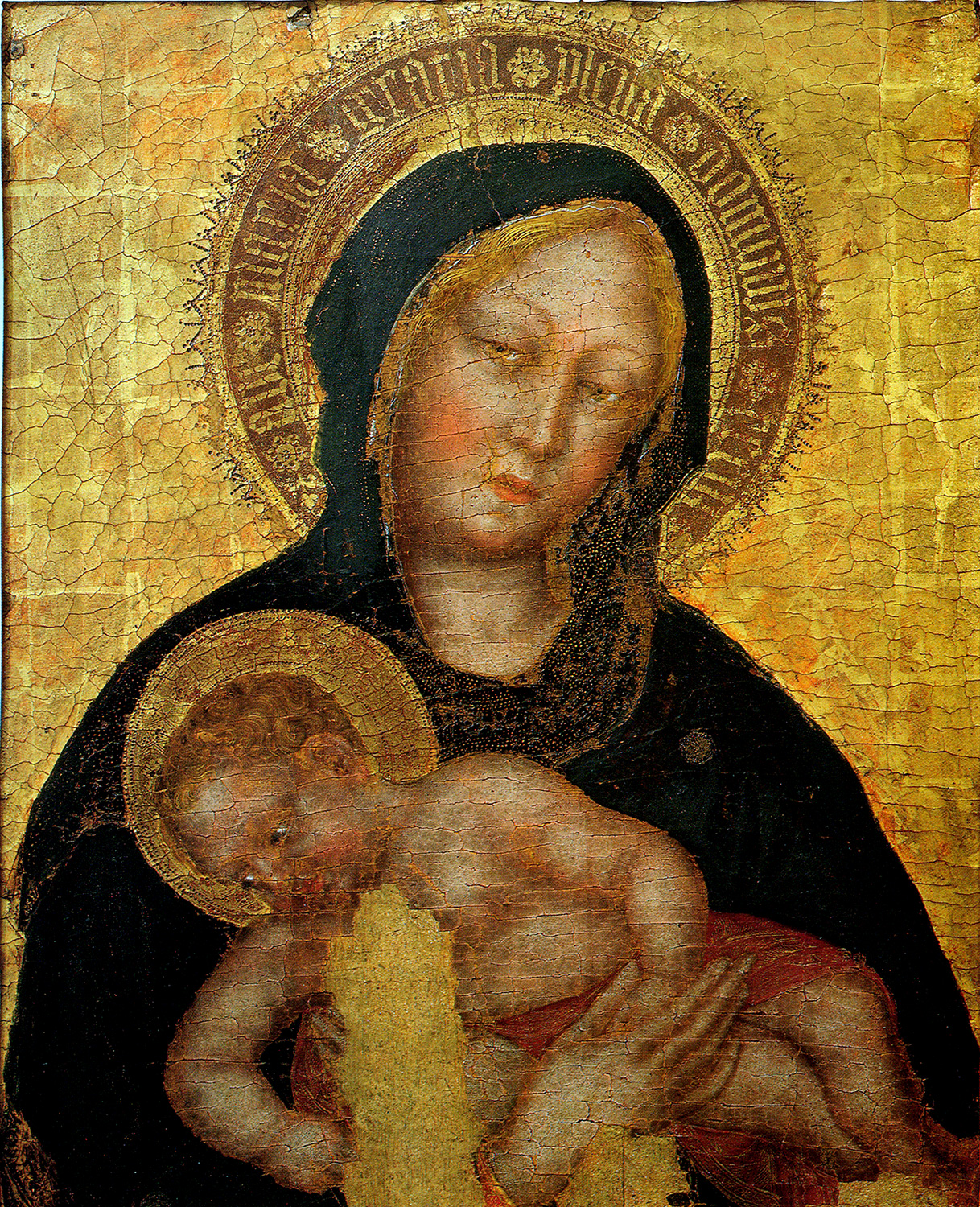
Madonna and Child (c. 1400–1405) by Gentile da Fabriano

Madonna and Child is a painting in tempera and gold leaf on panel, executed c. 1400–1405 by the Italian artist Gentile da Fabriano, now in the Pinacoteca Nazionale di Ferrara. It is signed at the base. Before being restored in 1980 it was thought to be by a follower of the artist due to thick repainting on the whole work.

The painting was previously part of Enea Vendeghini's collection – as with the rest of his collection he acquired it from an antique shop or a church or monastery in or near Ferrara. It was thus probably originally painted in Ferrara, probably for private devotion given its small size. Its style dates it to early in the 15th century during the artist's stay in Venice, from which he sent works to noble courts in other Italian cities.
