= Antonio Contri =

Italian painter

- Born: before 1701; Ferrara, Italy
- Died: September 10, 1731
- Known for: Painting; method for transferring wood paintings to canvas
- Movement: Baroque
- Relatives: Francesco Contri (son)
- Patrons: Bernardino Macchi

Antonio Contri (before 1701 – September 10, 1731) was an Italian painter of the Baroque period, mainly active in Ferrara.

Born in Ferrara to a prominent family of lawyers, As a young man in search of a career, he traveled from Rome to Paris in 1701. In Paris, he came under the patronage of a nobleman by the name of Bernardino Macchi of Cremona, and traveled with him to Cremona where he met the landscape painter Francesco Bassi. More important than his painting, he is claimed by Luigi Lanzi to have discovered the method to transferring wood paintings to canvas. His son Francesco Contri was also a painter.
