= Ludovico Mazzolino =

Italian painter

Ludovico Mazzolino (1480 – c. 1528) - also known as Mazzolini da Ferrara, Lodovico Ferraresa, and Il Ferrarese - was an Italian Renaissance painter active in Ferrara and Bologna.

== Biography ==
He was born and died in Ferrara. He appears to have studied under such painters as Lorenzo Costa, who also may have trained Dosso Dossi, and came under the influence of Ercole Roberti. In 1521 he married Giovanna, the daughter of Bartolomeo Vacchi, a Venetian painter. Much of his work was commissioned by the duke Ercole I d'Este from Ferrara. Mazzolino was influenced by il Garofalo and Boccaccino. He is known for devotional cabinet pictures, in a style somewhat regressive, or primitive, relative to the modern classicism then emerging. For example, his Massacre canvas has a turbulent and cartoonish crowding.

The exact date, or even year, of his death is not known, but he died during a plague which devastated the area.

== Paintings at National Gallery, London ==
- The Holy Family with Saint Francis
- Christ and the Woman taken in Adultery
- Christ disputing with the Doctors
- The Holy Family with Saint Nicholas of Tolentino
- The Nativity

== Selected works ==
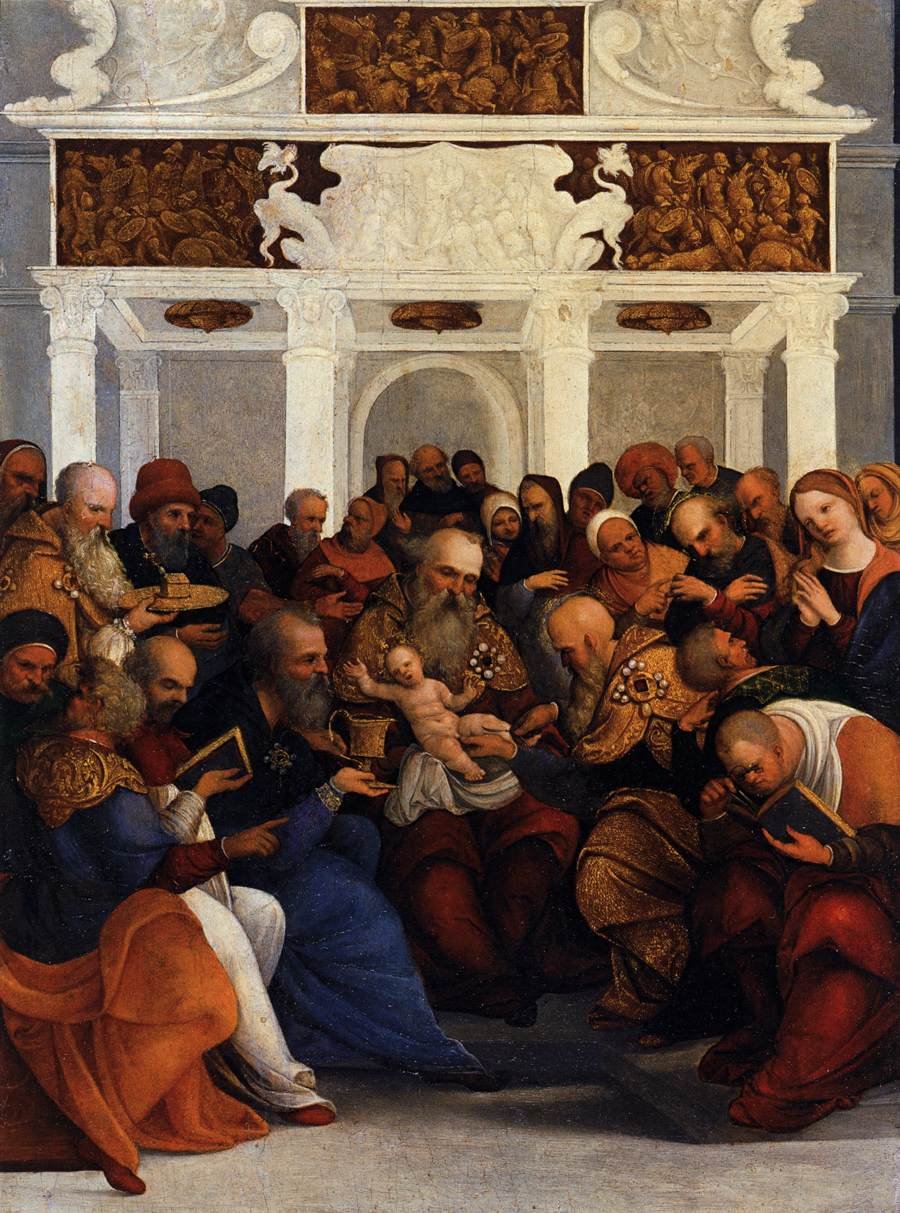
Circumcision

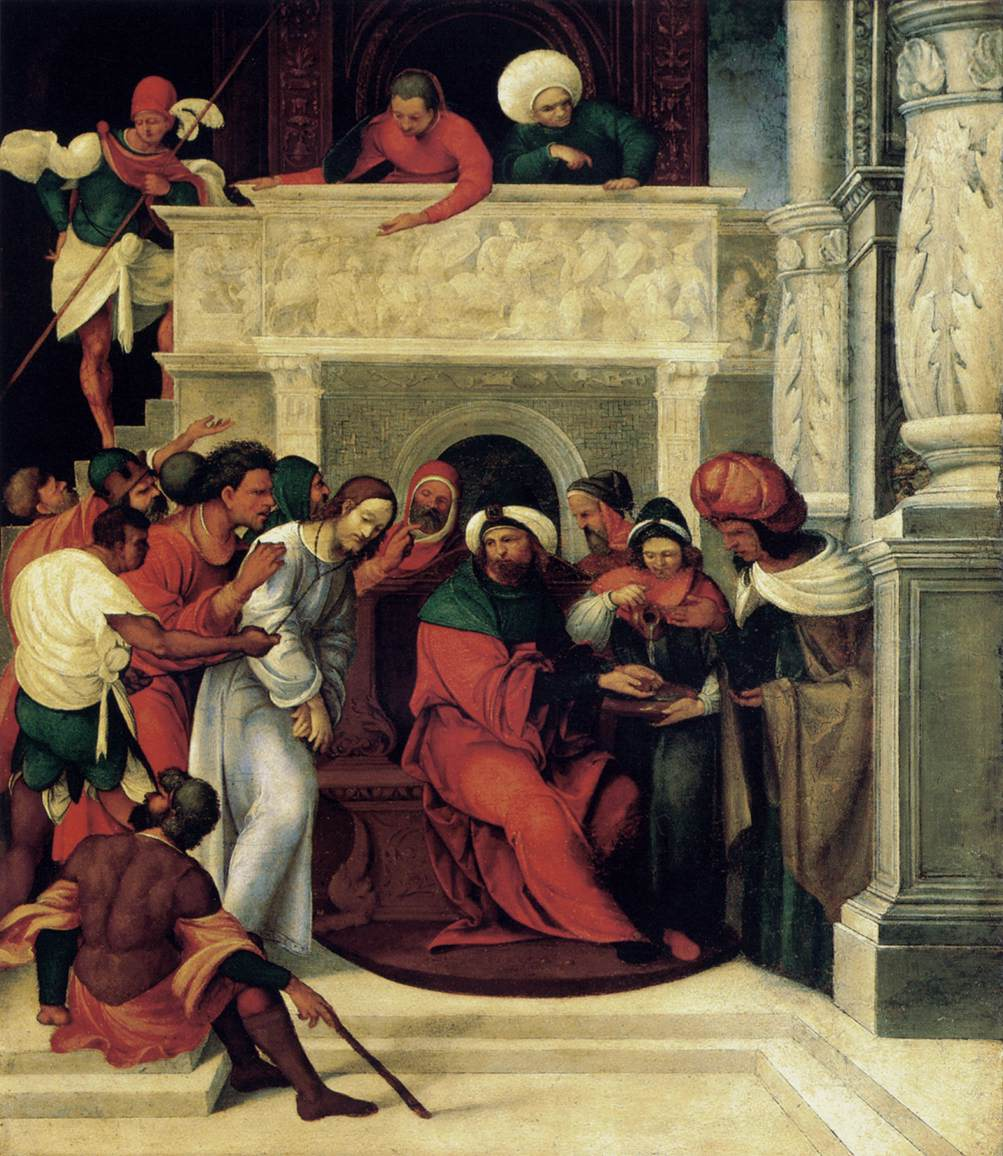
Christ before Pilate

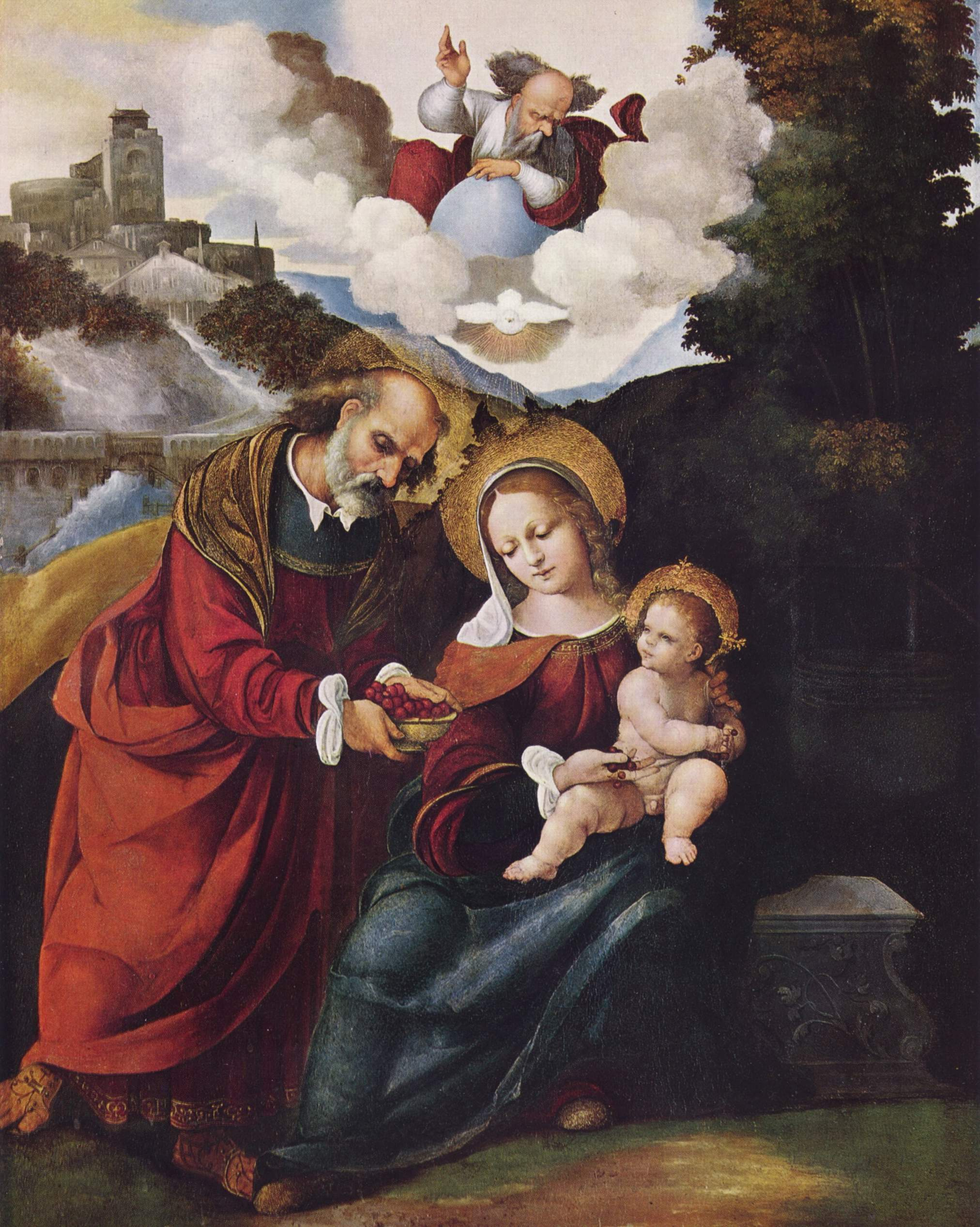
The Holy Family in a landscape

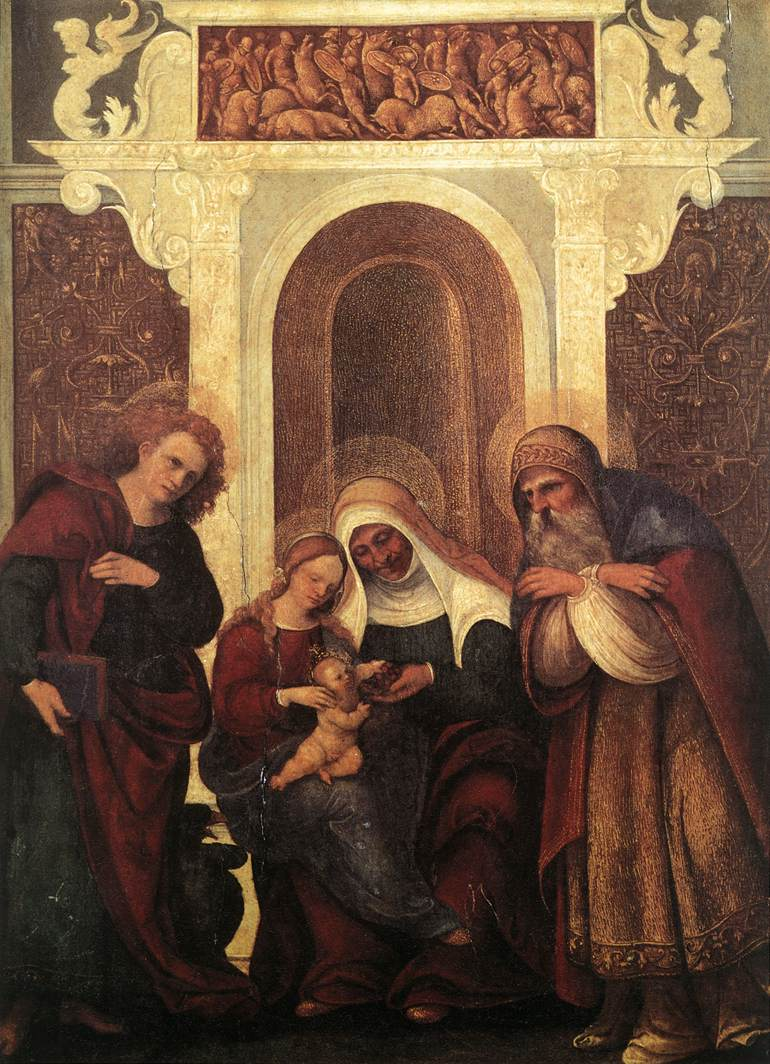
Madonna and Child with Saints

== Works elsewhere ==
- Christ disputing with Doctors (1520–25) (Gemaeldegalerie, Berlin)
- The Tribute Money (Christ Church, Oxford)
- Massacre of the Innocents (1515–1520, Uffizi)
- Madonna and Child with St Joseph (1522) (rediscovered September, 2009, Cheltenham, Gloucestershire, England)
- Adoration of the Shepherds (c. 1524) Ringling Museum Sarasota)
- Madonna with Saint Antonio Abbot (1525, Chantilly)
- Circumcision (1526, Vienna)
- Christ Purging the Temple (c. 1527) (Alnwick Castle, Northumberland, England)
- The Holy Family in a Landscape (Alte Pinakothek, Munich, Germany)
- The Crossing of the Red Sea (National Gallery of Ireland, Dublin)
