= Benvenuto Tisi =

Italian painter (1481–1559)

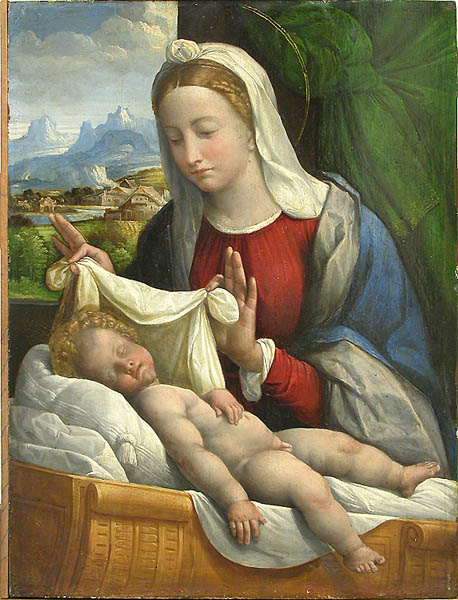
Jesus sleeping (Louvre)

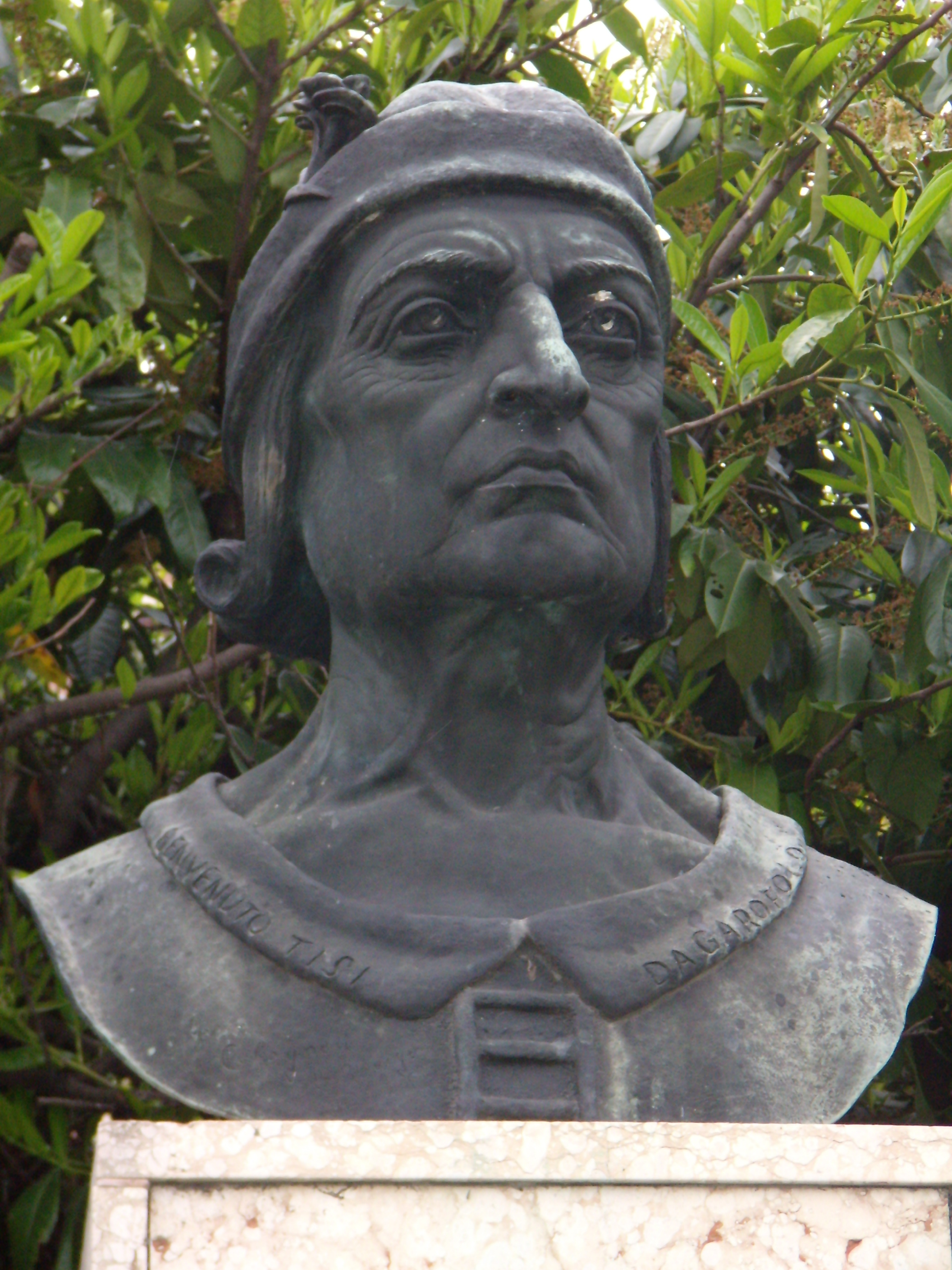
Monument to Benvenuto Tisi in Rovigo

Benvenuto Tisi (Italian: [beɱveˈnuːto ˈtiːzi]; 1481 – September 6, 1559), also known as Il Garofalo (Italian: [il ɡaˈrɔːfalo]), was a Late-Renaissance-Mannerist Italian painter of the School of Ferrara. Garofalo's career began attached to the court of the Duke d'Este. His early works have been described as "idyllic", but they often conform to the elaborate conceits favored by the artistically refined Ferrarese court. His nickname, Garofalo, may derive from his habit of signing some works with a picture of a carnation (in Italian, garofano, with a few dated variants).

== Biography ==
=== Early training ===
Born in Canaro near Ferrara, Tisi is claimed to have apprenticed under Panetti and perhaps Costa and was a contemporary, and sometimes collaborator with Dosso Dossi. In 1495 he worked at Cremona under his maternal uncle Niccolò Soriano, and at the school of Boccaccino, who initiated him into Venetian colouring. He may have spent three years (1509–1512), in Rome. This led to a stylized classical style, more influenced by Giulio Romano.

Invited by a Ferrarese gentleman, Geronimo Sagrato, to Rome, he worked briefly under Raphael in the decoration of the Stanza della Segnatura. From Rome family affairs recalled him to Ferrara; there Duke Alfonso I commissioned him to execute paintings, along with the Dossi, in the Delizia di Belriguardo and in other palaces. Thus the style of Tisi partakes of the Lombard, the Roman and the Venetian modes.

He painted extensively in Ferrara, both in oil and in fresco, two of his principal works being the "Massacre of the Innocents" (1519), in the church of S. Francesco, and his masterpiece "Betrayal of Christ" (1524). For the former he made clay models for study and a clay figure. He continued constantly at work until in 1550 blindness overtook him, painting on all feast-days in monasteries for the love of God. He had married at the age forty-eight, and died at Ferrara on the 6th (or 16th) of September 1559, leaving two children.

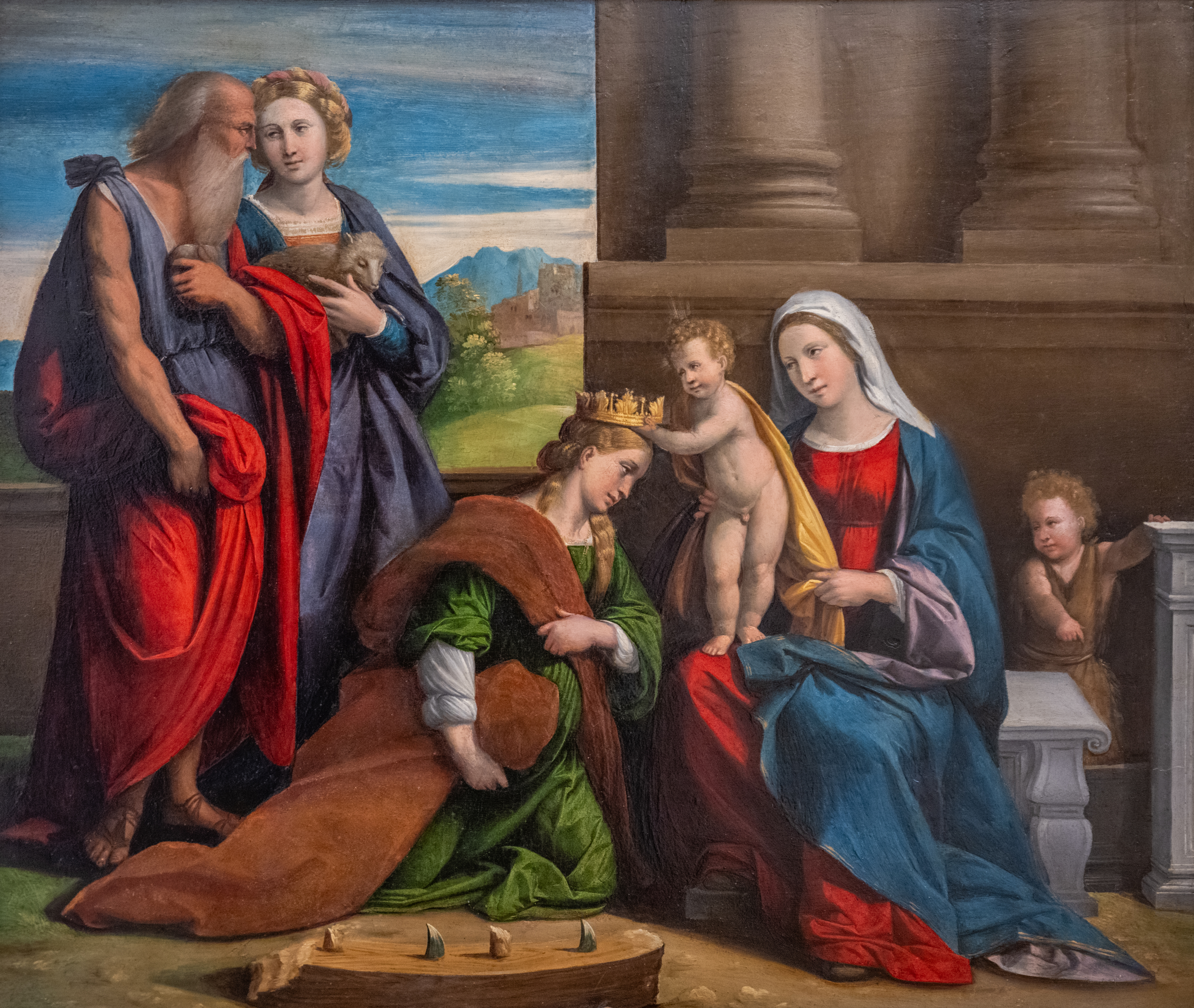
Coronation of Saint Catherine, Capitoline Museums

He was a friend of Giulio Romano, Giorgione, Titian and Ariosto; in a picture of "Paradise" he painted Ariosto between St Catherine and St Sebastian. In youth he was fond of lute-playing and also of fencing. He ranks among the best of the Ferrarese painters; his leading pupil was Girolamo da Carpi.

=== Mature works and assessment ===
Even his least successful works retain, amid their frigid and porcelain quality, a harmony which marks Venetian colouring. His youthful works include the "Boar Hunt" in the Palazzo Sciarra. Later, the "Knight's Procession" in the Palazzo Colonna in Rome — gave promise of an Italianate Cuyp, less commonplace, more romantic, and more refined than the Dutch artist.

His youthful works include the Boar Hunt in the Palazzo Sciarra and the Virgin in the Clouds with Four Saints (1518) in the Gallerie dell'Accademia in Venice, considered one of his masterpieces. The Pietà (1527) in the Brera Gallery in Milan reveals an increasingly stylized treatment. The Madonna (1532) in the Modena Gallery is a charming picture; however, the large Triumph of Religion in the Atheneum at Ferrara has been described as a "bookish" affair, whose episodes are difficult to elucidate. Garofalo is one of the painters known and described by Vasari. From 1550 till his death Garofalo was blind.

In 1520, Girolamo da Carpi is said to have apprenticed in Garofalo's workshop, and worked with him in Ferrarese projects in the 1530–40. Other pupils include Stefano Falzagalloni. Il Garofalo also influenced Antonio Pirri and Nicola Pisano (painter) (active 1499–1538).

== List of works ==
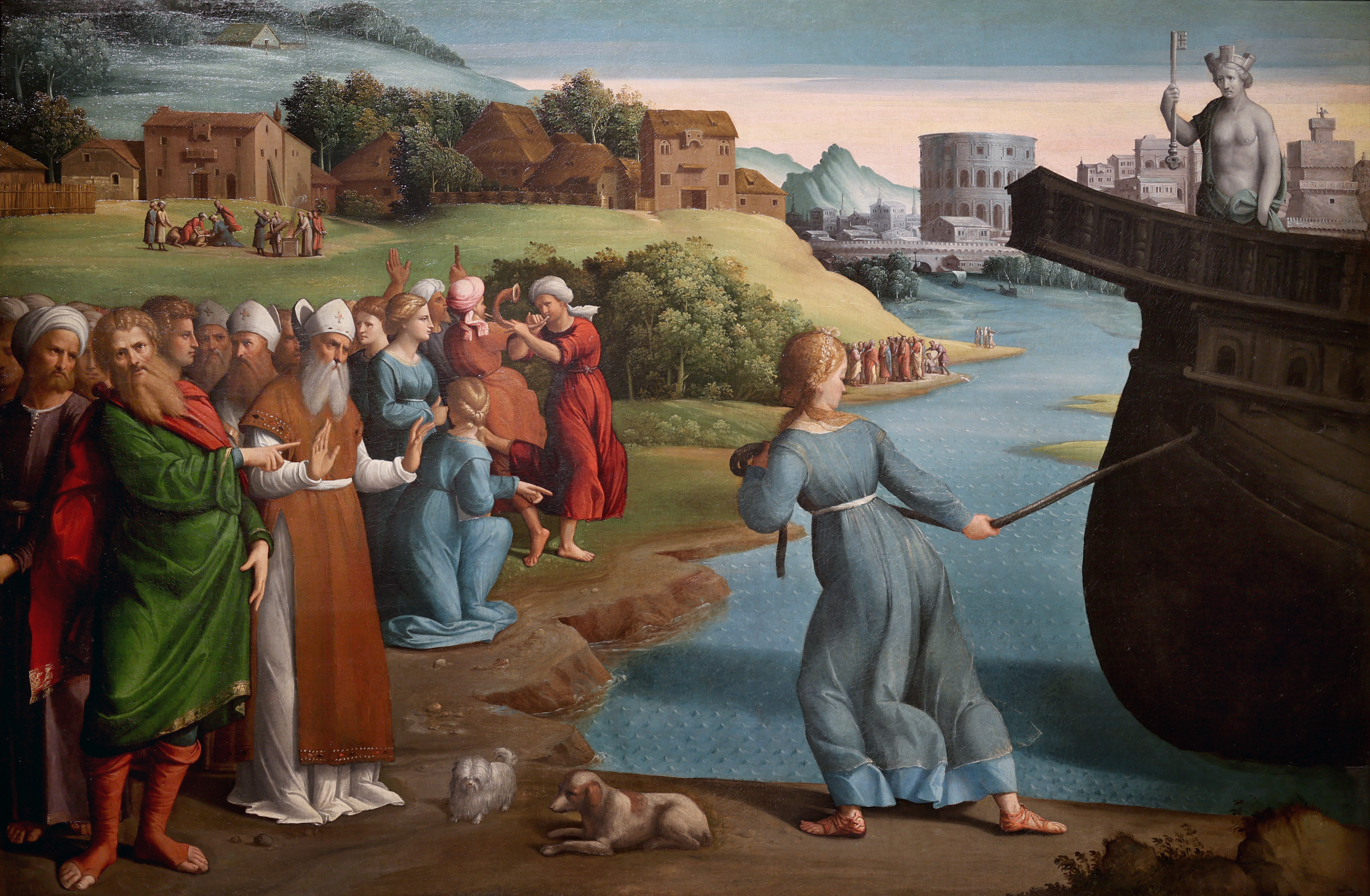
The Vestal Claudia Towing the Ship Bearing the Statue of Cybele, c. 1525-30

- The Virgin and Child with Saints Dominic and Catherine of Siena (c. 1500–1505) - National Gallery, London
- Adoration of the Child (1508–1509) - Pinacoteca Nazionale, Ferrara
- Adoration of the Magi (c. 1520–1530) - High Museum of Art, Atlanta
- Madonna and Child (1510) - Galleria dell'Arte Studiolo, Milan
- Neptune and Pallas (1512) - Art Gallery, Dresden
- Madonna delle Nuvole (1514) - Pinacoteca Nazionale, Ferrara
- Saint Catherine of Alexandria (c. 1515–1530) - National Gallery, London
- Madonna del Baldacchino (1517) - National Gallery, London
- The Madonna and Child Enthroned with Saints William of Aquitaine, Clare, Anthony of Padua and Francis (1517–1518) - National Gallery, London
- The Vision of Saint Augustine (c. 1518) - National Gallery, London
- Massacre of the Innocents (1519) - Pinacoteca Nazionale, Ferrara
- The Holy Family with Saints John the Baptist, Elizabeth, Zacharias and (?) Francis (1520) - National Gallery, London
- Christ Washing the Disciples' Feet (c. 1520-1525) - National Gallery of Art, Washington DC
- The Agony in the Garden (1520s–1530s) - National Gallery, London
- Baptism of Christ (1520–1525) - Birmingham Museum of Art, Alabama
- Madonna del Pilastro (1523) - Pinacoteca Nazionale, Ferrara
- Madonna Enthroned with Saints (1524) - Cathedral, Ferrara
- A Pagan Sacrifice (1526) - National Gallery, London
- An Allegory of Love (c. 1527–1539) - National Gallery, London
- Annunciation (1528) - Musei Capitolini, Rome
- Madonna Enthroned with Saints (1532) - Modena
- Madonna and Child and St. Jerome, c. 1530s, oil on panel, Dallas Museum of Art
- Adoration of the Magi, c. 1530s, oil on panel, Rijksmuseum
- Madonna in Glory (1532) - Musei Capitolini, Rome
- Raising of Lazarus (1534) - Pinacoteca Nazionale, Ferrara
- The Miracle of the Swine (c. 1535) – Alnwick Castle, Northumberland
- Madonna and Child in Glory (c. 1535) – Lowe Art Museum, Miami, Florida. United States
- Vestal Virgin Claudia Quinta tows the ship bearing the statue of Cibele - Palazzo Barberini, Rome
- Christ and the Samaritan Woman (1536) - Israel Museum, Jerusalem
- The Triumph of Bacchus (1540 finished by Garofalo, from unfinished 1517 draft by Raffael) - Gemäldegalerie Alte Meister, Dresden, Germany
- Blessing of Saint John the Baptist (1542) - San Salvatore, Bologna
- Conversion of Saint Paul (1545)- Galleria Borghese, Rome
- Annunciation (1550) - Pinacoteca di Brera, Milan
- Holy Family - Musée de Angers
- Holy Family - The child being bathed - Israel Museum, Jerusalem
- Holy Family
- Jesus in the Orchard
- Madonna and Child Enthroned - Dunedin Public Art Gallery, Dunedin
- Madonna Enthroned with Saints
- Madonna with Saint John and Saint Elisabeth - Courtauld Institute, London
- Mars, Venus and Cupido - Wawel Royal Castle, Kraków
- St Sebastian - Museo di Capodimonte, Naples
- Washing feet of Christ - National Gallery, Washington DC

== Sources ==
- Freedberg, Sydney J. (1993). Pelican History of Art (ed.). Painting in Italy, 1500–1600. Penguin Books.
- Francis P. Smyth; John P. O'Neill, eds. (1986). The Age of Correggio and the Carracci: Emilian Painting of the 16th and 17th Centuries. National Gallery of Art, Washington DC. pp. 141–43.
- Dosso Dossi, Garofalo, and the Costabili Polyptych: Imaging Spiritual Authority, The Art Bulletin, June, 2000 by Giancarlo Fiorenza pp. 252–279
