= Art collection of BPER Banca =

The Collezione di dipinti antichi della Banca Popolare dell’Emilia Romagna is a collection of classic Italian artworks from the last seven centuries in Emilia-Romagna, that has been purchased by Banca Popolare dell'Emilia Romagna.

Modern viccisitudes have concentrated the collection of Italian art to a few entities, most prominently banks. Those artworks in private hands in Italy cannot win export licences, hence find local homes with such patrons. The collection of the Banca Popolare dell’Emilia Romagna is not unique in its scope, like most banks it focus on local talent; in fact this formidable collection includes artists from the last seven centuries from the region or whose paintings could be found locally.

In 2017 the BPER Banca Gallery was opened in Modena to make the collection accessible to the public.

== Collection ==
Painter	Work
Adriaen van Utrecht	Still life with figure
Sisto Badalocchio	Diana, nymphs, and Callisto
George Barret	Landscape
Giovanni Battista Benvenuti (l'Ortolano)	Madonna & Child
Carlo Bononi	Madonna and Child
Francesco Brini	Portrait of vice-legate Lenzi
Guido Cagnacci	St. Agatha
Cristoforo Canozi da Lendinara	Adoration of Christ-child by St. Bernard
Giovanni Francesco Caroto	Portrait of young monk
Annibale Carracci	St Jerome
Ludovico Carracci	Susana and the elders
Giacomo Cavedone	Jacob's Mourning Judith with head of Holofernes
Giovanni Battista Cipriani	Landscape
Michele Coltellini	San Giovanni Battista
Giuseppe Maria Crespi	David
Antonio Allegri (Correggio)	St. Helena behind Saints Sebastian, Dominic, Peter, & Jerome and Battle-scene
Jacques Courtois (il Borgognone)	After battle
Giovanni Gioseffo dal Sole	Priam's death and Madonna of the Rose
Michele Desubleo	Tancredi baptizes Clorinda
Francesco Bianchi Ferrari	St. Jerome in the desert
Luca Ferrari	St. Andrew and Encounter of Rachel and Jacob
Marcantonio Franceschini	Rachel and Leah
Cesare Gennari	Portrait of Lady and child and Crucifixion
Girolamo da Carpi	St. Cecilia
Ercole Graziani	Abraham & Isaac
Guercino	Apollo & Marysias
Innocenzo da Imola (Francucci Innocenzo)	Madonna and child
Bonaventura Lamberti	Preaching of St. Francesco di Sales
Ludovico Lana	Irene treats the wounds of St. Sebastian
Pietro di Giovanni Lianori	Virgin in sorrow
Marchesi Gir (Girolamo da Cotignola)	Perspective of a town
Giuseppe Marchesi (il Sansone)	Armida becomes enamored of Rinaldo
Tommaso Realfonso (Masillo)	Still-life: Flowers and fruit
Lucio Massari	Magdalen in meditation
Alessandro Mazzola	Madonna and child
Marco Meloni	Madonna and child and St John the Baptist
Aureliano Milani	Sampson defeats the Philistines, Sampson carries of the doors of Gaza, and Delilah deprives Sampson of his strength
Aureliano Milani	Sampson labors at mill
Francesco Monti	Joseph in jail explains dreams and Love disarmed by Diana's nymphs
Lorenzo Pasinelli	Young girl with open cage
Bartolomeo Ramenghi (il Bagnacavallo)	Noli me tangere
Bartolomeo Schedoni	Madonna and child
Simone di Filippo	(Simone dei Crocifissi) Six images of Saints: Agatha, Catherine, Dominic, Dorothy, Nicola di Bari and Florian
Francesco Antonio Simonini	Marching Army
Ilario Spolverini	Battle
Francesco Stringa	Redeemer blessing
Orazio Talami	David Penitent and Madonna with child, and Saints George & Nicola da Tolentino
Alessandro Tiarini	Rinaldo & Armida
Lodewijk Toeput (il Pozzoserrato)	Landscape with figure
Flaminio Torri	St Jerome in prayer
Francesco Vellani	Assumption of the Virgin
Gaspare Venturini	Allegory of Good Government
Francesco Zaganelli	Madonna and child

== See also ==
- Art collection of Fondazione Cassa di Risparmio di Cesena
