= Marcantonio Franceschini =

Italian painter (1648–1729)

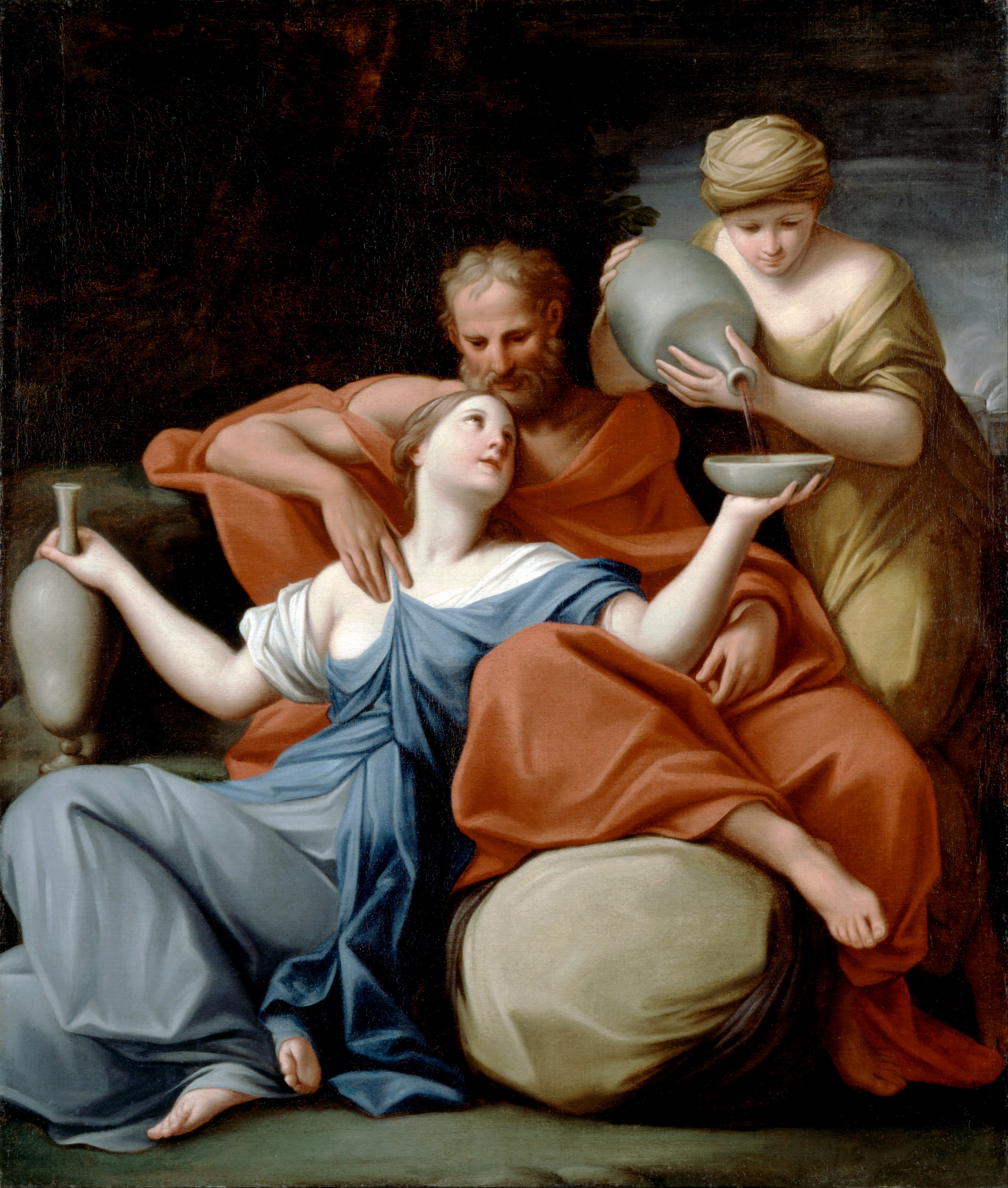
- Lot and his Daughters, 1676-77, Dulwich Picture Gallery
- Born: 1648; Bologna, Papal States
- Died: 24 December 1729 (aged 80–81); Bologna, Papal States
- Education: Carlo Cignani
- Known for: Painting
- Movement: Baroque

Marcantonio Franceschini (Italian pronunciation: [markanˈtɔːnjo frantʃeˈskiːni]; 1648 – 24 December 1729) was an Italian painter of the Baroque period, active mostly in his native Bologna. He was the father and teacher of Giacomo Franceschini.

== Biography ==
Marcantonio Franceschini was born in Bologna on 5 April 1648 to Giacomo and Giulia Maffei. He was the brother of the musician Petronio. He began his artistic studies under Giovanni Maria Galli da Bibiena. At around the age of twenty, he joined the workshop of Carlo Cignani, with whom he worked on the frescoes in the Palazzo del Giardino in Parma (1678–1681). He worked closely for many years with his brother-in-law, Luigi Quaini, who was also the cousin of Cignani.

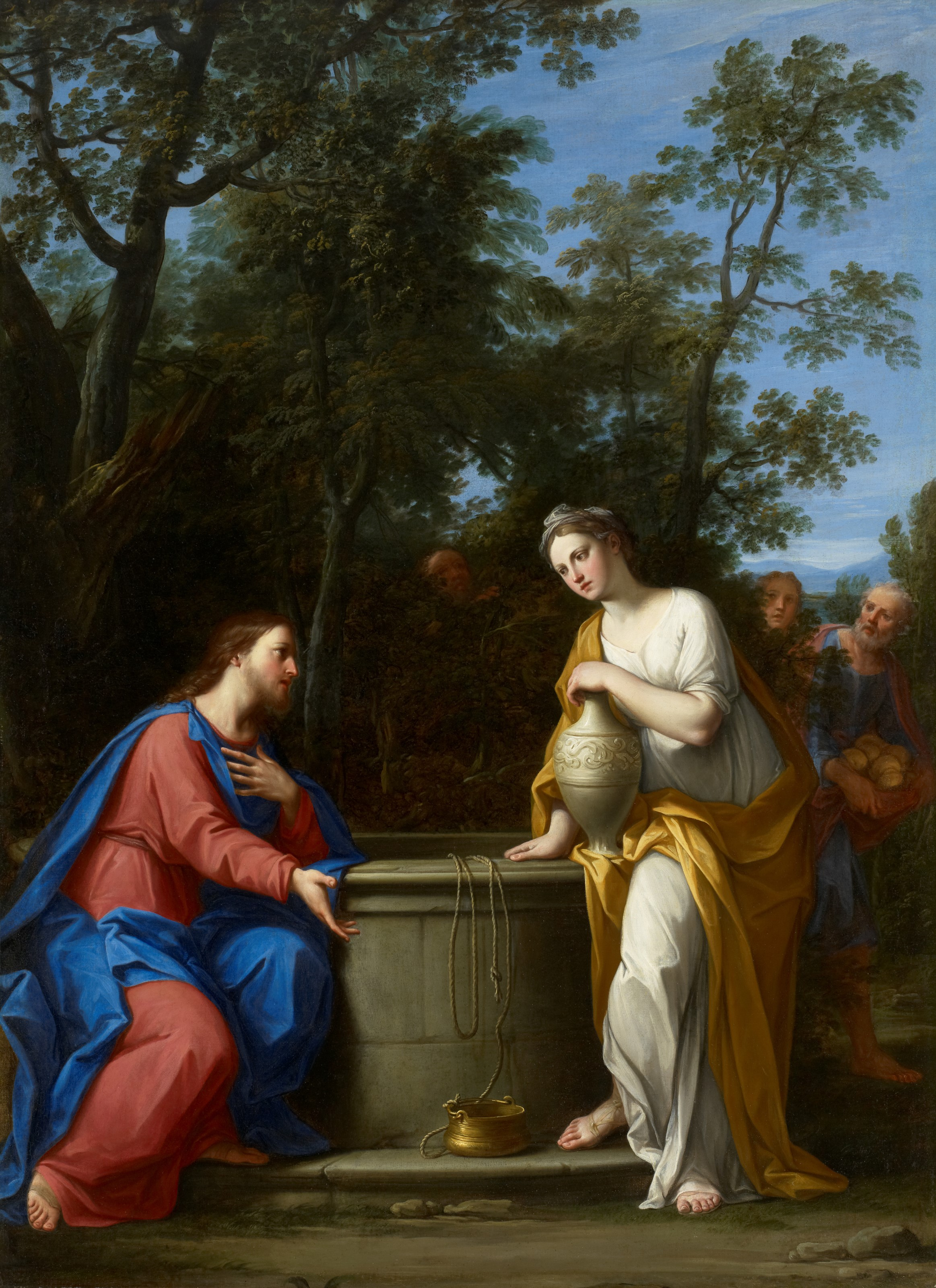
Christ and the Woman of Samaria, circa 1700, Museum of Fine Arts, Houston

Franceschini had a long career painting canvases on religious and mythological subjects for patrons throughout Europe. Franceschini decorated some ceilings in the Palazzo Ranuzzi (1680) and the Palazzo Marescotti Brazzetti (1682) in Bologna. He helped paint in the tribune at the church of San Bartolomeo Porta Ravegnana (1690). Franceschini frescoed the ceiling of the Sala d'Onore ("Hall of Honour") in the Ducal Palace of Modena, commissioned in 1696 for the marriage of Rinaldo d'Este to Princess Charlotte Felicity of Brunswick. He painted the altarpiece in the Cathedral of Finale Ligure and the canvas of San Carlo in the church of the same name in Modena.

His massive program of historical and mythological scenes in the Sala del Maggior Consiglio of the Palazzo Ducale of Genoa (1701–1704) was destroyed by a fire in 1777. These had been completed with the help of Tommaso Aldrovandini, Quaini, and Antonio Meloni. In addition, his decorations of the pendentives and lunettes of the Piacenza Cathedral were removed in the late 19th century. He decorated the church of Corpus Domini (1688–1694) in Bologna.

He painted 26 canvases of the Seductions and Loves of the Diana and Venus (1692-1700) for the Viennese palace (now Liechtenstein Museum) of Prince Johann Adam I of Liechtenstein. He also served as a buyer for the art patron Prince.

In Genoa, he also painted for the palaces Spinola and the Palazzo Pallavicini (now Podestà) (1715) of Genoa. The latter had five large canvases of the history of Diana.

Canvases depicting The Four Seasons (1716) are now found in the Pinacoteca di Bologna. There are two canvases of the Story of Rachel in the Pinacoteca B.P.E.R.

He painted the cartoons used to make the mosaic decoration of the Cappella del Coro in St. Peter's Basilica. Knighted by Pope Clement XI, he was a founding member and a subsequent director of the Clementine Academy in Bologna.

His paintings have an academic and idealist strain, even for a member of the Bolognese School of Painting. The sparse figures are severely arranged and often porcelain in features. He worked with a younger colleague, Donato Creti. His style is often classified as Barochetto, a mixture of baroque and rococo; but it could also be said that the neoclassical influence of French artists was beginning to overtake the baroque tradition. Wittkower describes him as the "Bolognese Maratta".

Numerous painters worked and trained in his prolific studio. Among those who spent time as pupils, apprentices, or assistants were Tommaso Aldrovandini, Luca Antonio Bistoia, Giacomo Boni, Francesco Caccianiga, Ferdinando del Cairo, Antonio Cifrondi, Gaetano Frattini, Maria Oriana Galli Bibiena, Giacinto Garofalini, Carlo Cesare Giovannini, Ercole Graziani the elder, Girolamo Gatti, Pietro Gilardi, Giuseppe Marchesi (il Sansone), Michelangelo Monticelli, Giuseppe Pedretti, Pietro Francesco Prina, Pietro Antonio Avanizi, Antonio Rossi (painter), Gentile Zanardi, and his son Jacopo.

The Dulwich Picture Gallery (London), the Honolulu Museum of Art, the Kunsthistorisches Museum of Vienna, the Metropolitan Museum of Art, the Musei Civici of Macerata, the Museo Glauco Lombardi (Parma, Italy), the National Art Gallery of Bologna (Italy), Bojnice Castle (Slovakia) and the State Museums of Florence are among the public institutions holding paintings by Marcantonio Franceschini.

== Gallery ==
=== Paintings ===
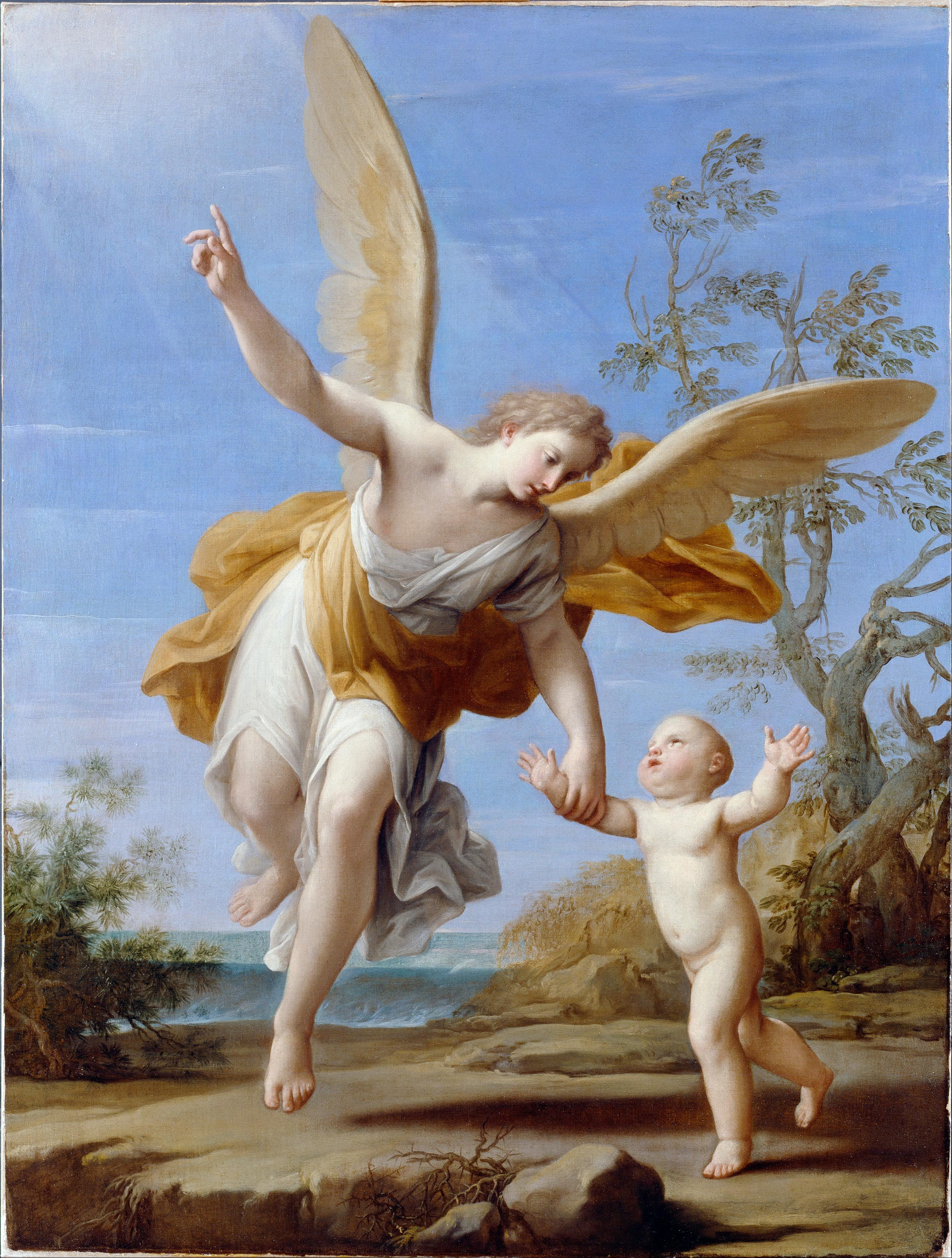
The Guardian Angel, 1716, Dulwich Picture Gallery

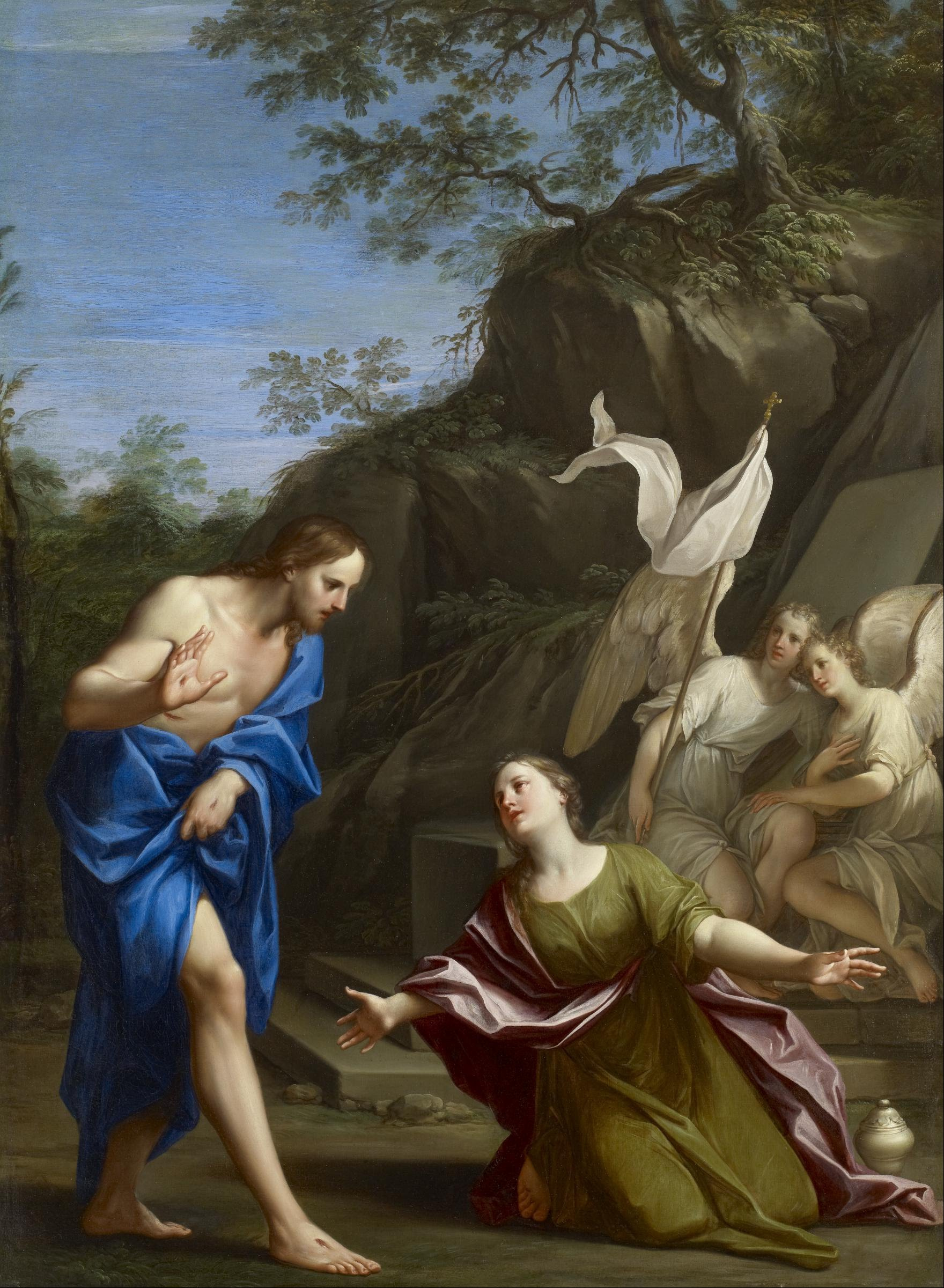
Noli me tangere, c. 1700, Museum of Fine Arts, Houston

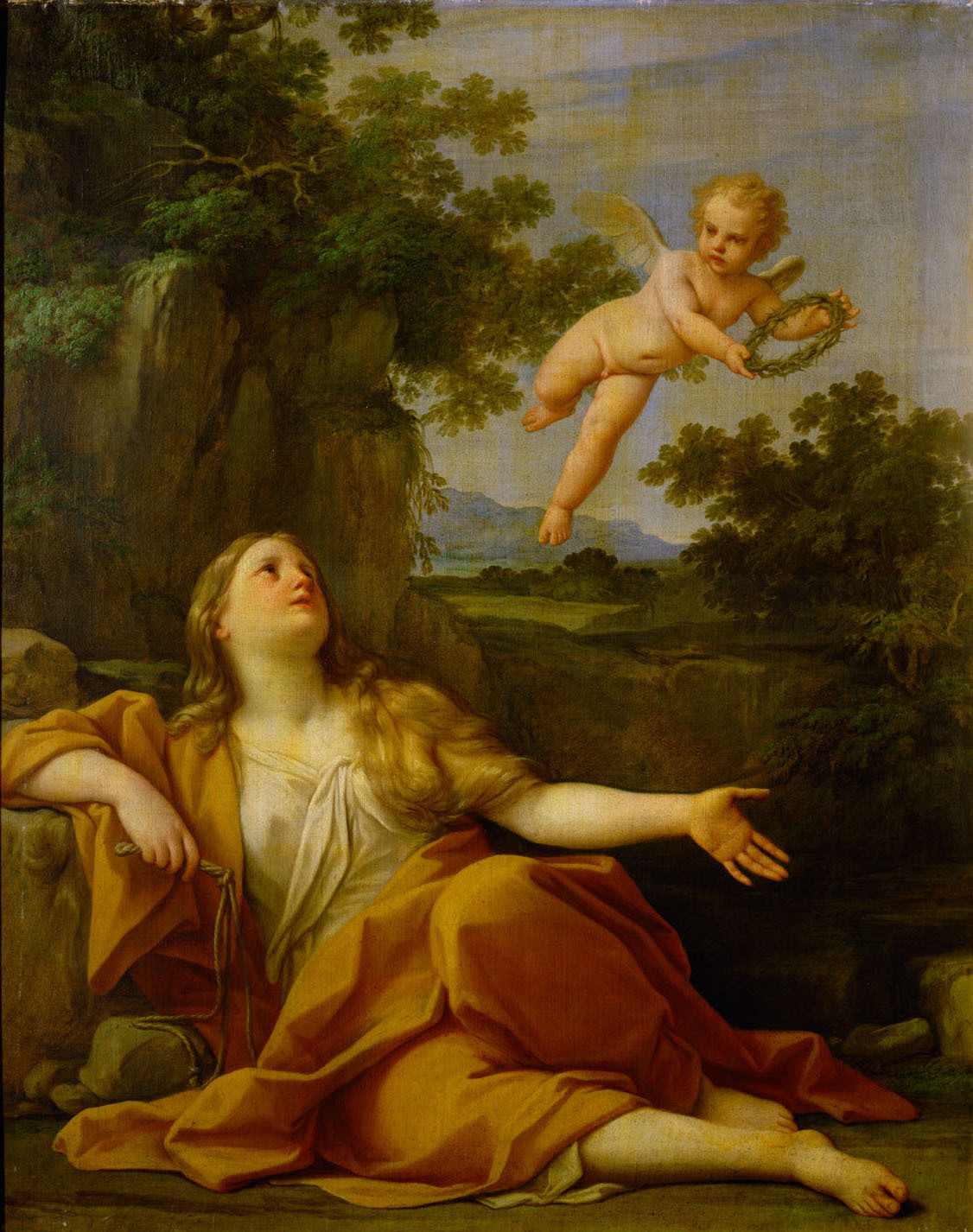
Penitent Mary Magdalene, circa 1700–05, Kunsthistorisches Museum, Vienna

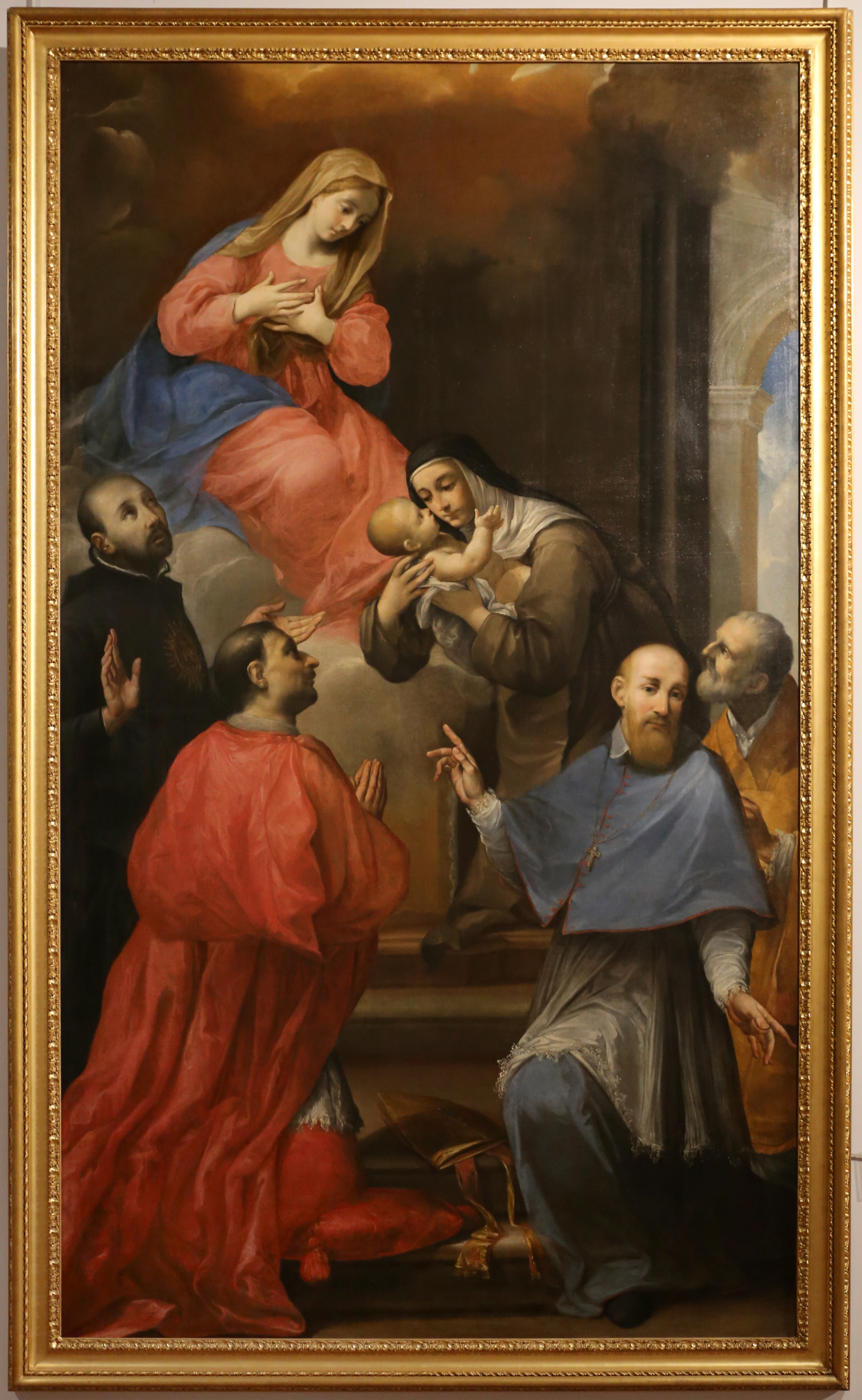
Madonna and Child with Five Saints, Musée Fesch, Ajaccio

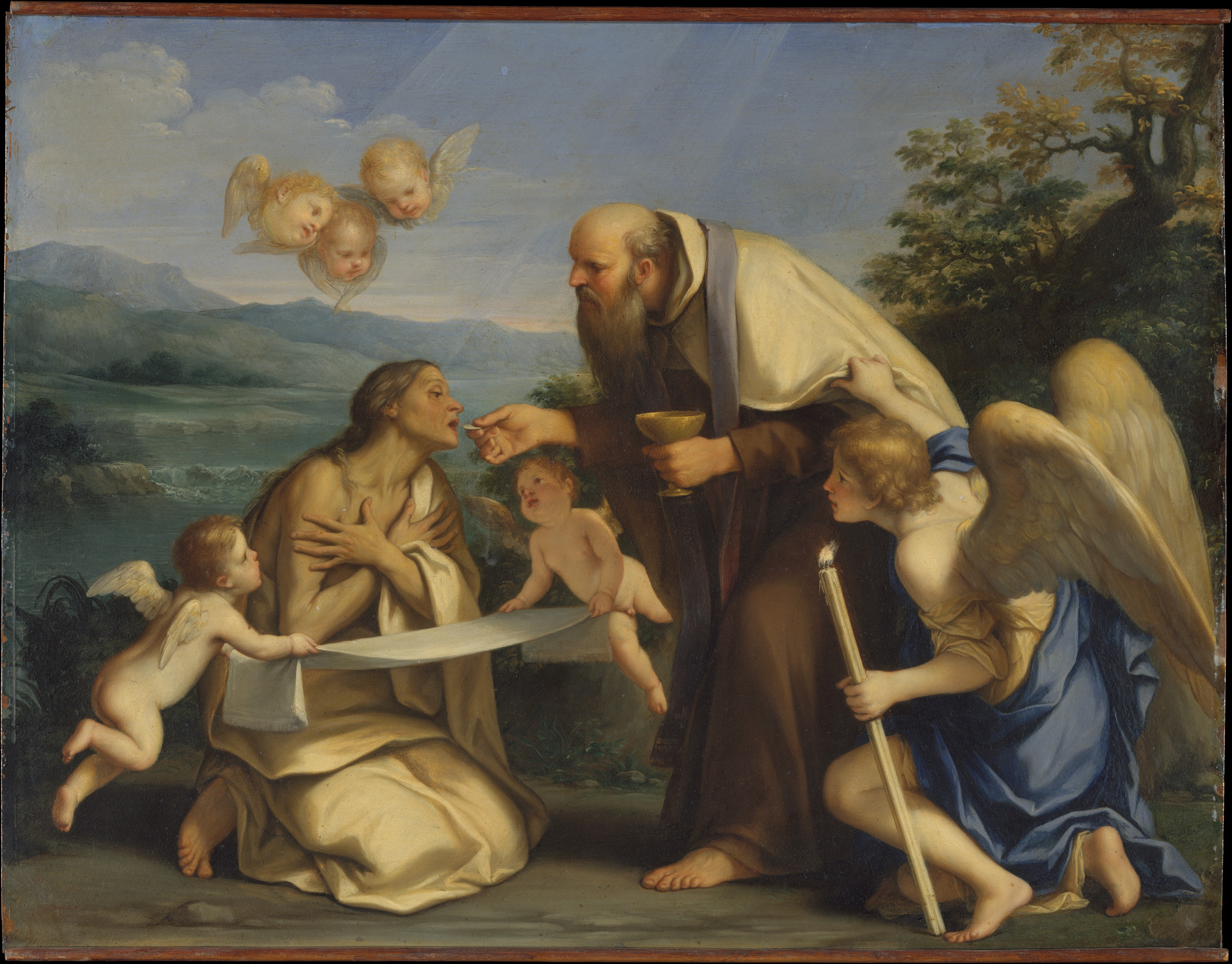
The Last Communion of Saint Mary of Egypt, 1680, Metropolitan Museum of Art, New York

Armida tries to kill the sleeping Rinaldo, Modena, Civic Museum

=== Drawings ===
Rest on the Flight into Egypt (no date), pen, brown ink, and brown wash, 35.5 x 49.9 cm., National Gallery of Denmark, Copenhagen

Head of a Child Thrown Back (no date), 24.4 x 24.8 cm., Nationalmuseum, Stockholm

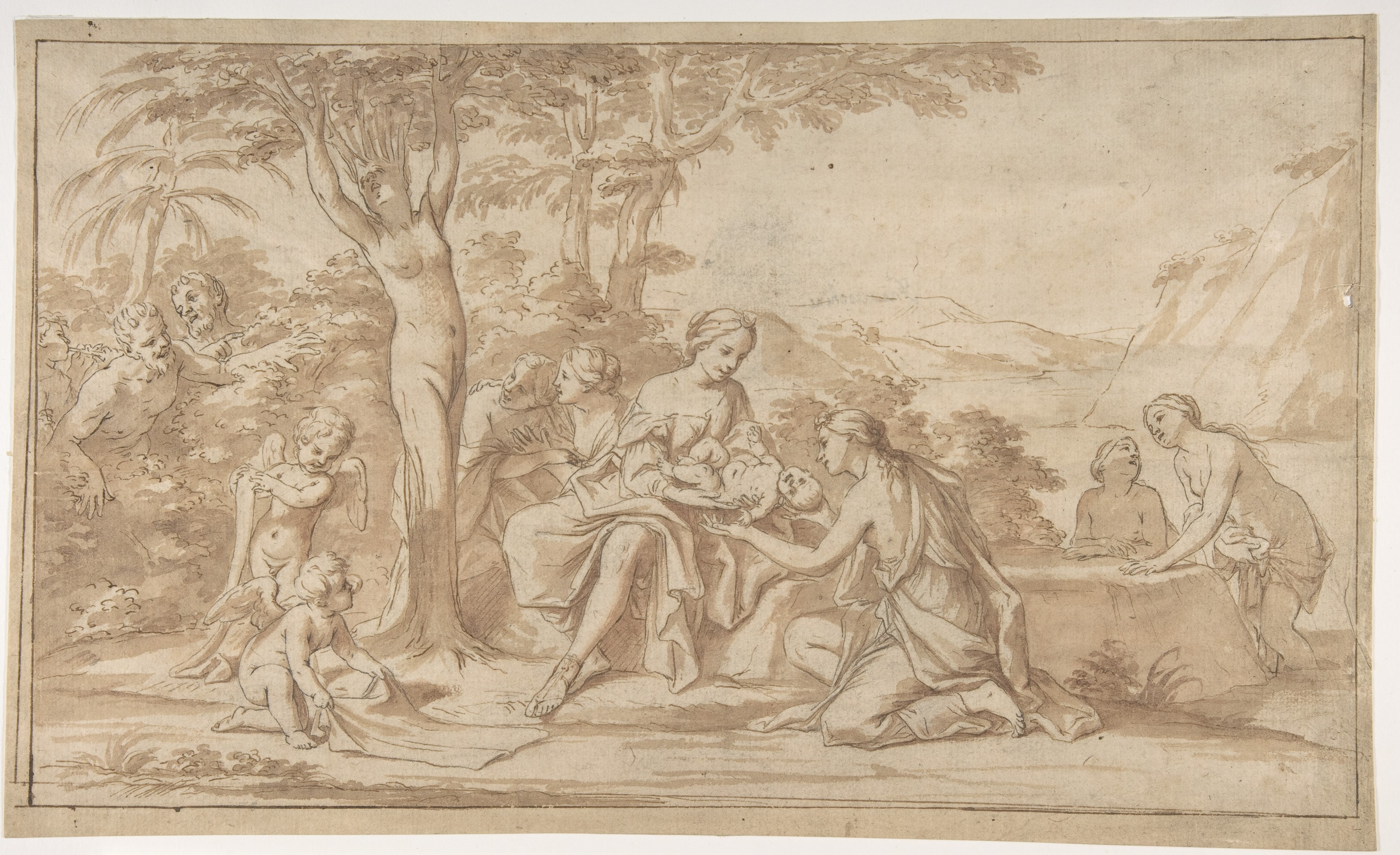
The Birth of Adonis circa 1684, pen and brown ink, brush and brown wash, 24.3 x 40.5cm., Metropolitan Museum of Art

Allegorical Figure of Faith (no date), pen and brown ink, brush and gray wash, 39.8 x 29.8cm., Metropolitan Museum of Art

Head of a Young Woman, 1670-1700, pen, ink and wash, 46 x 36 cm., Metropolitan Museum of Art

Ruins of a Basilica or Mausoleum 1711, red chalk, 25.3 x 35.1 cm., Cleveland Museum of Art

== Sources ==
- Francis P. Smyth; John P. O'Neill, eds. (1986). The Age of Correggio and the Carracci: Emilian Painting of the 16th and 17th Centuries. Washington: National Gallery of Art. pp. 450–453.
- Wittkower, Rudolf (1993). Art and Architecture Italy, 1600-1750. Penguin Books. p. 471.
- Lanzi, Luigi (1847). Thomas Roscoe (ed.). The History of Painting in Italy; from period of the revival of the arts to the eighteenth century. London: Henry G. Bohn. pp. 158–160.
- Miller, Dwight C. (1957). "Franceschini and the Palazzo Podestà, Genoa". The Burlington Magazine. Vol. 99, no. 652. pp. 230–235.
