= George Barrett =

George Barrett may refer to:

- George Barrett (actuary) (1752–1821), English actuary
- George Barrett (jockey) (1863–1898), English jockey
- George W. Barrett (1887–1936), American murderer
- George F. Barrett (1907–1980), Illinois Attorney General
- George S. Barrett, American business executive in the health care industry
- George W. Barrett (bishop) (1908–2000), American bishop
- George C. Barrett (1838–1906), Irish-American lawyer and judge from New York
- George Barrett (anarchist), English anarchist writer

== See also ==
- George Barret (disambiguation)
