= Fratta =

Fratta may refer to:

== Places ==
=== Italy ===
Municipalities (comuni)

- Fratta Polesine, in the Province of Rovigo, Veneto
- Fratta Todina, in the Province of Perugia, Umbria
- Frattamaggiore, in the Province of Naples, Campania
- Frattaminore, in the Province of Naples, Campania
- Umbertide, in the Province of Perugia, Umbria, known as Fratta until 1863
- Valera Fratta, in the Province of Lodi, Lombardy

Civil parishes (frazioni)

- Fratta (Caneva), in the municipality of Caneva (PN), Friuli-Venezia Giulia
- Fratta (Cortona), in the municipality of Cortona (AR), Tuscany
- Fratta (Fontaniva), in the municipality of Fontaniva (PD), Veneto
- Fratta (Fossalta di Portogruaro), in the municipality of Fossalta di Portogruaro (VE), Veneto
- Fratta (Maniago), in the municipality of Maniago (PN), Friuli-Venezia Giulia
- Fratta (Montefalco), in the municipality of Montefalco (PG), Umbria
- Fratta (Oderzo), in the municipality of Oderzo (TV), Veneto
- Fratta (Romans d'Isonzo), in the municipality of Romans d'Isonzo (GO), Friuli-Venezia Giulia
- Fratta (Rotonda), frazione del comune di Rotonda (PZ), Basilicata
- Fratta (Tarzo), in the municipality of Tarzo (TV), Veneto
- Fratta Terme, in the municipality of Bertinoro (FC), Emilia-Romagna
- Frattaguida, in the municipality of Parrano (TR), Umbria
- Frattavecchia, in the municipality of Castiglione del Lago (PG), Umbria
- La Fratta, in the municipality of Sinalunga (SI), Tuscany

=== San Marino ===
- Fratta or Cesta, one of the three towers of the City of San Marino

== People with the surname ==
- Domenico Maria Fratta (1696–1763), Italian painter and engraver

== See also ==
- Fratte (disambiguation)
