= Carmelite Church, Lviv =

Catholic (Ukrainian catholic) church

Coordinates: 49°50′33″N 24°02′14″E

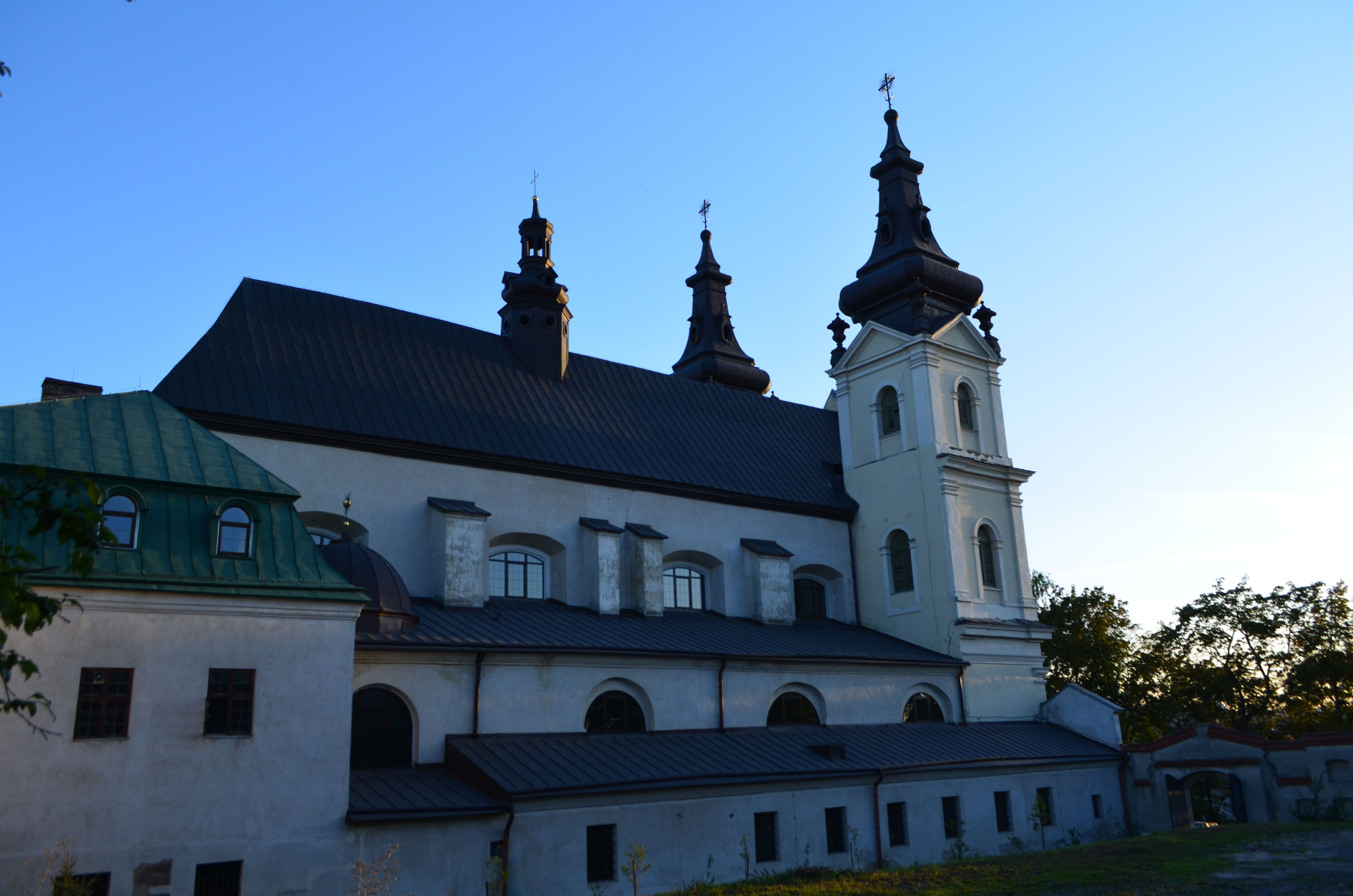
Side view of the church

The Carmelite Church is a Ukrainian Greek Catholic parish church in Lviv.

== History ==
The church building was first mentioned in 1634 as the church of a Barefoot Carmelite monastery. The suburban location caused the church to be rather well fortified, yet it was ravaged by the Cossacks in the Khmelnytsky Revolt and the Swedes in the Great Northern War. In 1748 it was the scene of a notorious scuffle ("monomachia") between the Carmelites and their neighbours, the Capuchins.

After 1789 the church has passed through a succession of owners. The Ukrainian Greek Catholic Church, an Eastern Catholic sui iuris church in the Catholic Church, currently operates the building, which reconsecrated the church under the patronage of Michael the Archangel in 1991.

== Architecture ==
The entire façade was redesigned in the 19th century. Still, the building retains much of its original character and design, attributed to architect Jan Pokorowicz. Especially noteworthy are the 300-year-old black marble altar and a series of frescoes executed by Giuseppe Pedretti in the 1730s.

== Monastery garden ==
Starting from 1968, the garden of the former Carmelite monastery near the church became a popular gathering place of hippies and members of other subcultures, who proclaimed their own "Holy Garden Republic" in the locality. Members of the "republic" engaged in spreading dissident literature, popularized rock music and even created their own band. Despite being located only a few dozens of meters from the seat of the regional committee of the Communist Party, the "Holy Garden" became a place of rock concerts and sessions, which attracted visitors from different parts of the Soviet Union.

During the late 1970s, after incidents of streaking in front of the party office, as well as a march in memory of Jimi Hendrix organized by the community, Soviet police started a crackdown, "exiling" the "Holy Garden" to a different location. Amid increasing pressure from the KGB, in 1983 the "republic" ceased its existence. However, its former members continued to be active in public life, taking part in anti-Soviet demonstrations later in the decade. Since 1990, the garden has been cared for by monks, who returned to the location.

== Gallery ==
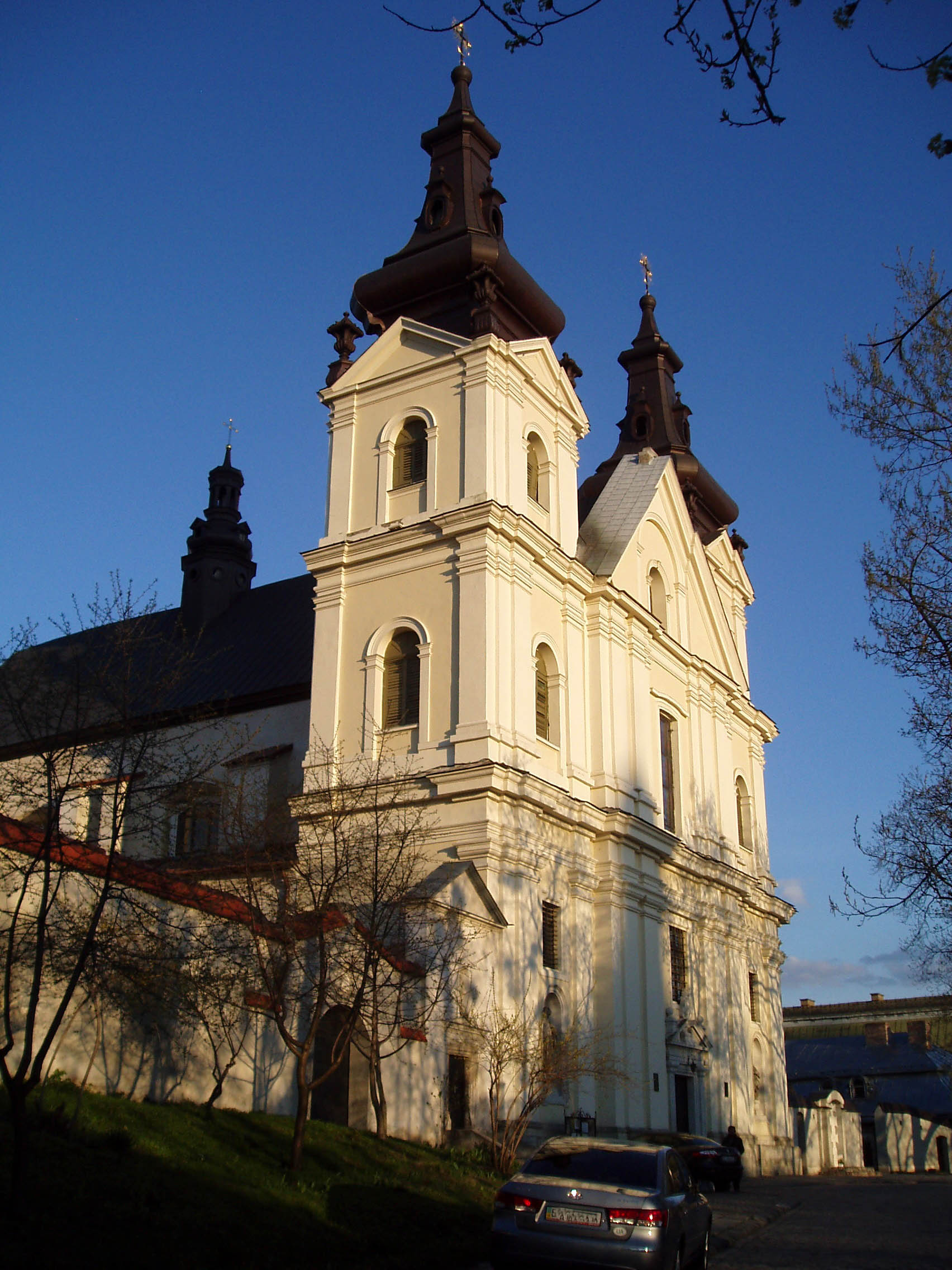
The former Carmelite church, as seen from the Powder Tower

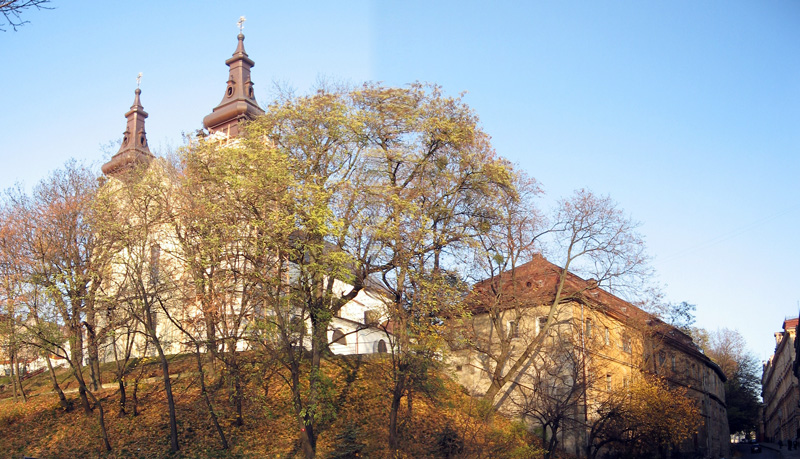
The remaining monastery fortifications

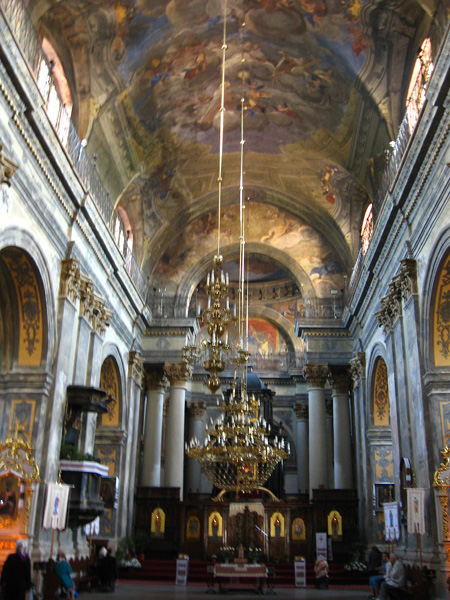
The interior

== Sources ==
- Островский Г. С. Львов. Издание второе, переработанное и дополненное. Ленинград: Искусство, 1975. С.113.
- Памятники градостроительства и архитектуры Украинской ССР. Киев: Будивельник, 1983–1986. Том 3, с. 78.
