= Donato Creti =

Italian painter (1671–1749)

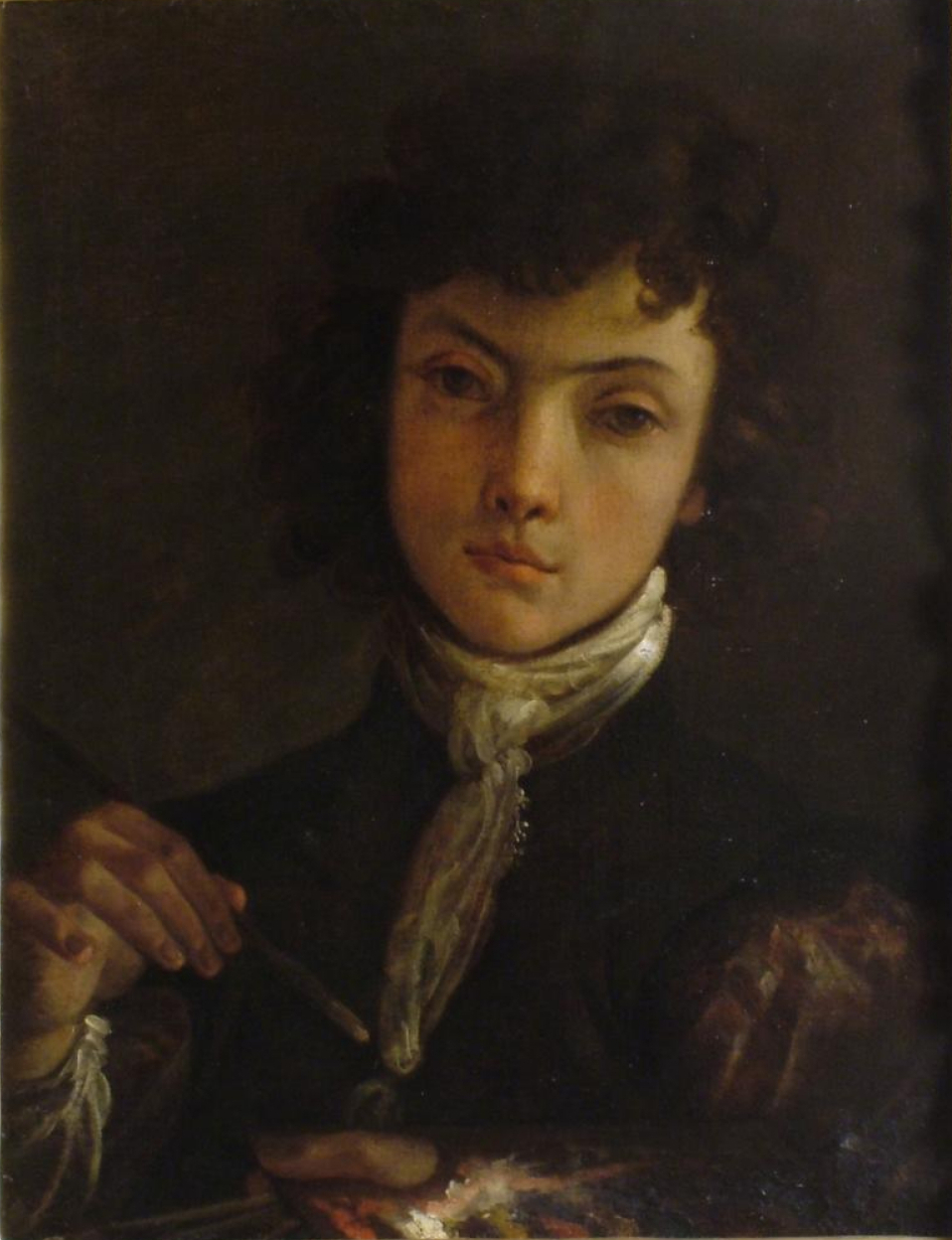
- Self-portrait, 1687 or 1688
- Born: 24 February 1671; Cremona, Milan
- Died: 31 January 1749 (aged 77); Bologna, Papal States
- Education: Lorenzo Pasinelli
- Known for: Painting

Donato Creti (24 February 1671 – 31 January 1749) was an Italian painter of the Rococo period, active mostly in Bologna, Papal States. He is described by Wittkower as the "Bolognese Marco Benefial", in that his style was less decorative and edged into a more formal neoclassical style. It is an academicized grand style that crystallizes into a manneristic neoclassicism, with crisp and frigid modeling of the figures. Among his followers were Aureliano Milani, Francesco Monti, and Ercole Graziani the Younger. Two other pupils were Domenico Maria Fratta and Giuseppe Peroni.

== Biography ==
=== Training and early works, 1685–1710 ===
Creti's father, Gioseffo (1634–1714), was a painter ‘di mediocre fama’ (Zanotti) who specialized in architectural painting. The family moved to Bologna when Donato was two. He trained with the minor painter Giorgio Rasparini and then entered the studio of Lorenzo Pasinelli; Pasinelli had studied with Simone Cantarini, Guido Reni’s most gifted pupil. Creti was a precocious artist, affectionately nicknamed ‘ragazzino’ as the youngest and most gifted of Pasinelli's students.

His talent was soon noticed by Conte Alessandro Fava, whose son, Pietro, studied with Creti in Pasinelli's life drawing classes. A study of the Carracci's frescoed friezes in the Palazzo Fava, Bologna, showing stories of Europa and Jason, was an established part of a Bolognese artist's training. Creti was invited to live in the palazzo and given a small stipend, and before 1700, according to Zanotti, he benefited from a study visit to Venice with Pietro Fava. In return for this generous support, Creti gave Conte Alessandro paintings and drawings.

Fava inscribed and dated some of these works, providing important evidence for Creti's early chronology. The picture of a Youth Holding Two Candles (1688; Bologna, priv. col.), inscribed and dated by Fava, is Creti's earliest documented painting. A Self-portrait of the artist as a young man (Pinacoteca Nazionale di Bologna) seems to date from the same period. Among the drawings inscribed by Fava are Two Seated Boys, a Study of Heads (1685; both Florence, Uffizi) and a Martyrdom of a Saint (1691; Bologna, ex-col. Zanassi), with, on the verso, a series of heads executed with the brilliant calligraphic flourish that characterizes one aspect of Creti's draughtsmanship.

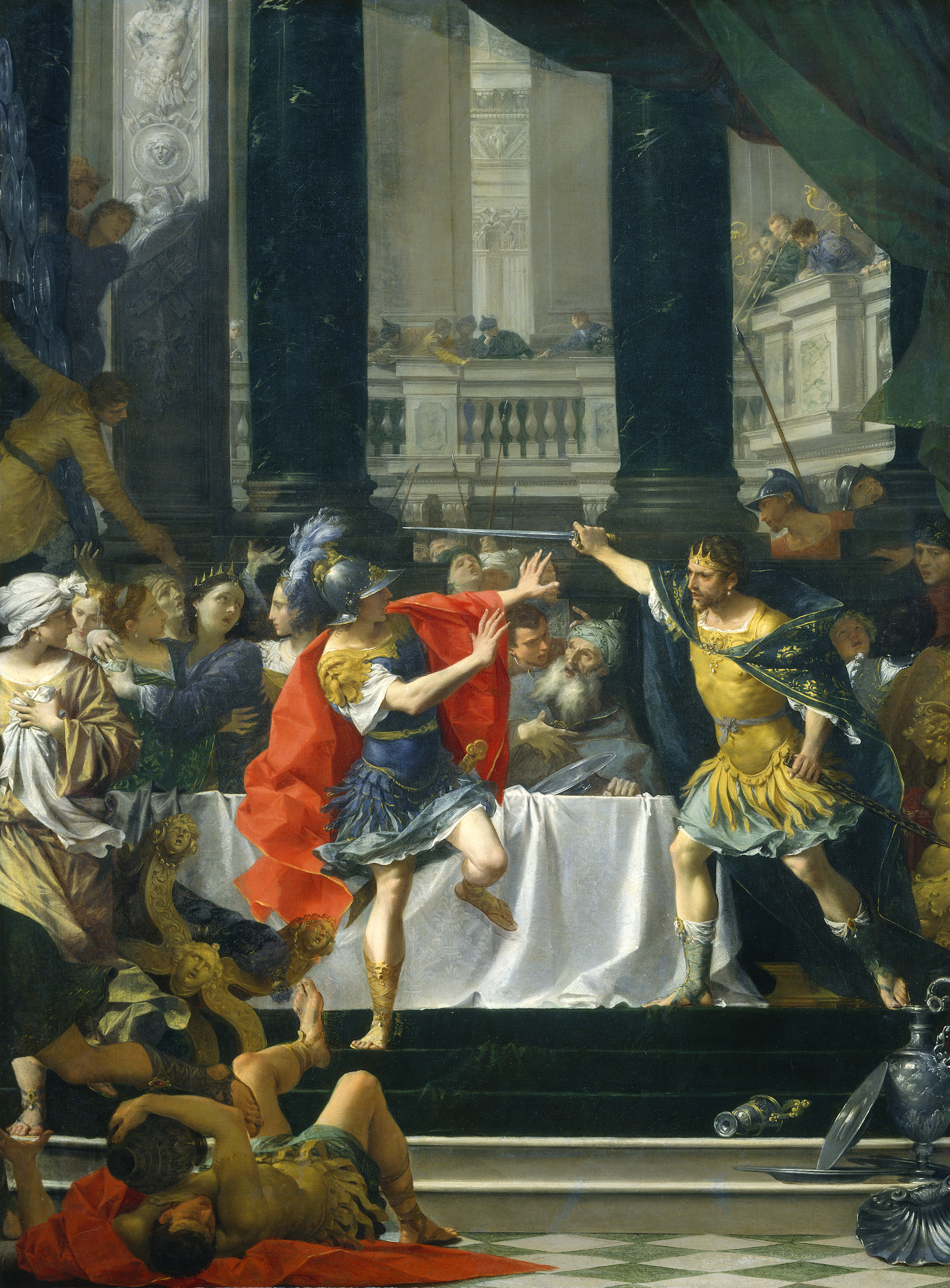
Alexander the Great Threatened by His Father, before 1705, National Gallery of Art, Washington

The most masterly work painted for Fava, which established Creti's fame with his contemporaries, was Alexander the Great Threatened by His Father, Philip of Macedonia (before 1705; Washington, DC, National Gallery of Art), a picture distinguished by the theatrical grandeur of the architectural setting, which is indebted to Paolo Veronese, and by the richness and variety of expression and gesture.

During these early years Creti also painted decorative frescoes. When he was 17 he decorated a room in the Palazzo Fava with a frieze of landscapes with figures. A little later (c. 1690) he worked with the quadratura painters Tommaso Aldrovandini and Ercole Graziani the Elder (1651–1726) on decorations in the Palazzo Zaniboni-Pichi (now Bianconi), Bologna. In the palazzo of the Conte di Novellara he painted ‘varie imprese d’Alessandro’ (Zanotti); one of these scenes is recorded in a bozzetto, the Family of Darius before Alexander (c. 1700; priv. col.). In 1708 he frescoed the ceilings of three rooms in the Palazzo Pepoli Campogrande, Bologna, for Conte Ercole Pepoli. Two of these, Nobiltà and Gloria, are no longer visible. The third, Alexander Cutting the Gordian Knot, is Creti's only surviving large-scale decorative fresco. It is seen in steep di sotto in sù perspective and is impressive evidence of his ability as a fresco decorator. The scene is set in a fantastic, almost surreal, domed chamber, which was painted by the quadratura painter Marcantonio Chiarini.

In these years Creti also painted astonishingly accomplished, glacially elegant pictures of subjects from ancient and biblical history and from classical mythology. He painted some genre scenes, mainly of musical gatherings. His Old Woman Recounting the Story of Psyche to a Young Woman (1705; Bologna, priv. col.), painted for the Bolognese Senator Paolo Magnani, is an unusual blending of the real and the ideal. He set the naturalism of the old woman against the ideal beauty of the younger and enriched a severely classical composition with anecdotal detail. In a preparatory drawing (Pinacoteca Nazionale di Bologna) the shading is carried out by careful hatching. Zanotti, who knew Creti, noted his anxiety over this picture and his fear that it would be unworthy of other works in the collection. Throughout his account Zanotti stressed Creti's melancholy disposition.

=== Middle years, 1711–20 ===
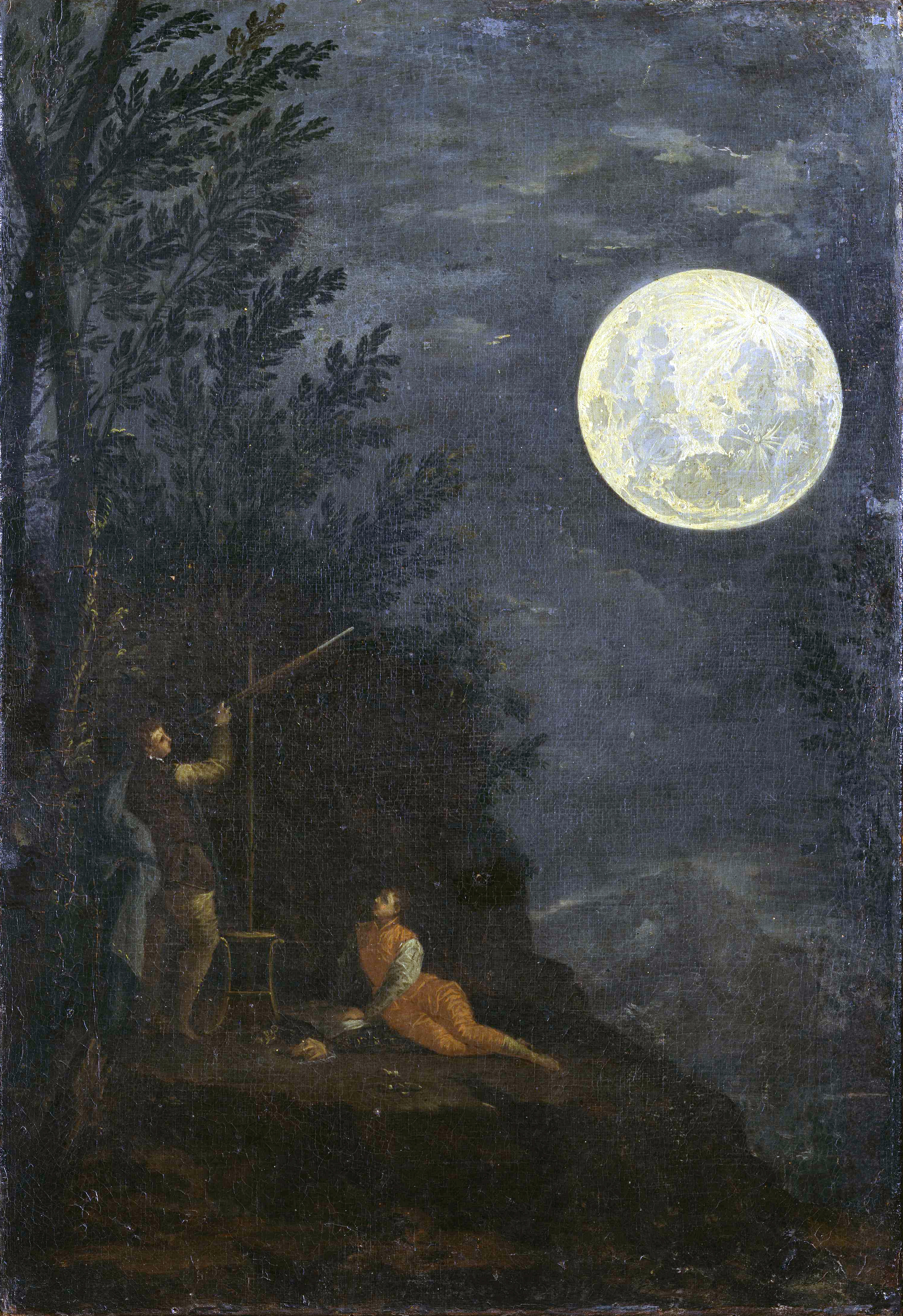
Astronomical Observations: the Moon, 1711, Pinacoteca Vaticana, Rome

In 1711 a distinguished fellow citizen, General Luigi Ferdinando Marsili, commander of the papal forces during the pontificate of Clement XI, commissioned Creti to paint eight small pictures illustrating astronomical observations made of the moon and other planets (all Rome, Pinacoteca Vaticana). The pictures showed the instruments used for these observations, which Marsili, himself a scientist, had given to Bologna's Istituto delle Scienze. These extraordinary little nocturnes, magically atmospheric, were a gift to the Pope, to encourage him to establish an astronomical observatory for the institute. With the support of Clement XI, the first public astronomical observatory in Italy, the Observatory of Bologna, was opened a short time later. Creti's work was overseen by the astronomer Eustachio Manfredi for accuracy. The eight small canvases depict celestial bodies, disproportionately sized and illuminated, above nocturnal landscapes. They display the Sun, Moon, a comet, and the then-known five planets: Mercury, Venus, Mars, Jupiter, and Saturn. Particularly notable is the painting depicting the observation of Jupiter, which displays the Great Red Spot, discovered by Cassini in 1665, and at least three moons.

In 1713 Creti painted a mural in a corridor of the University of Bologna, now the Biblioteca Comunale dell’Archiginnasio, commemorating a distinguished member of the Sbaraglia family, Giovanni Girolamo Sbaraglia, a celebrated anatomist. There followed a series of pictures painted for Marco Sbaraglia, who was to become Creti's most enthusiastic patron. The four large and imposing narrative pictures (Bologna, Palazzo Comunale) form an unrivalled display of the artist's distinction. They illustrate episodes from the Story of Achilles, in which Creti employed to the full all the learning, artifice and poetic sentiment at his command. The female figures are strikingly beautiful and, according to Zanotti, were modelled on Francesca Zani, whom Creti had married in 1713. Her death in 1719 caused the artist the greatest distress. His pictures for Marco Sbaraglia also include four lovely tondi, Charity, Temperance, Humility and Prudence, and the large companion paintings of Mercury Bringing the Head of Argus to Juno and Mercury Bringing the Golden Apple to Paris. In the latter the figure of Paris superbly paraphrases Reni's celebrated Samson in Samson Victorious (c. 1618–19; Pinacoteca Nazionale di Bologna).

=== Late years: success beyond Bologna, 1721–49 ===
Creti enjoyed considerable success in his later years. He had been among the founder-members of the Accademia Clementina in Bologna and was active in its functions. Between 1713 and 1727 he was seven times director of studies and often judge of student competitions. In 1728 he was appointed the eleventh principe of the Accademia.

In these years his reputation grew outside Bologna. Cardinal Tommaso Ruffo, papal legate to Bologna from 1721 to 1727, commissioned from Creti the Dance of Nymphs (c. 1724; Rome, Palazzo Venezia) and two large and impressive companion pictures, Solomon and the Queen of Sheba and Solomon’s Idolatry (before 1727; both Clermont-Ferrand, Musée Bargoin). About 1725 Ruffo honoured Creti with the title of Cavaliere.

The Dance of Nymphs and such other pastoral idylls as the Country Idyll (c. 1730; Pinacoteca Nazionale di Bologna) are perhaps Creti's most appealing works. The idealized figures are displayed in hauntingly evocative arcadian settings, at twilight, suffused by a mood of sadness. It was such works that inspired Longhi to describe Creti as the ‘Italian Watteau’. His landscape drawings of the period are similar in mood; in his Sleeping Endymion (Pinacoteca Nazionale di Bologna) the rendering is quite painstakingly detailed and brings to mind the technique of engraving.

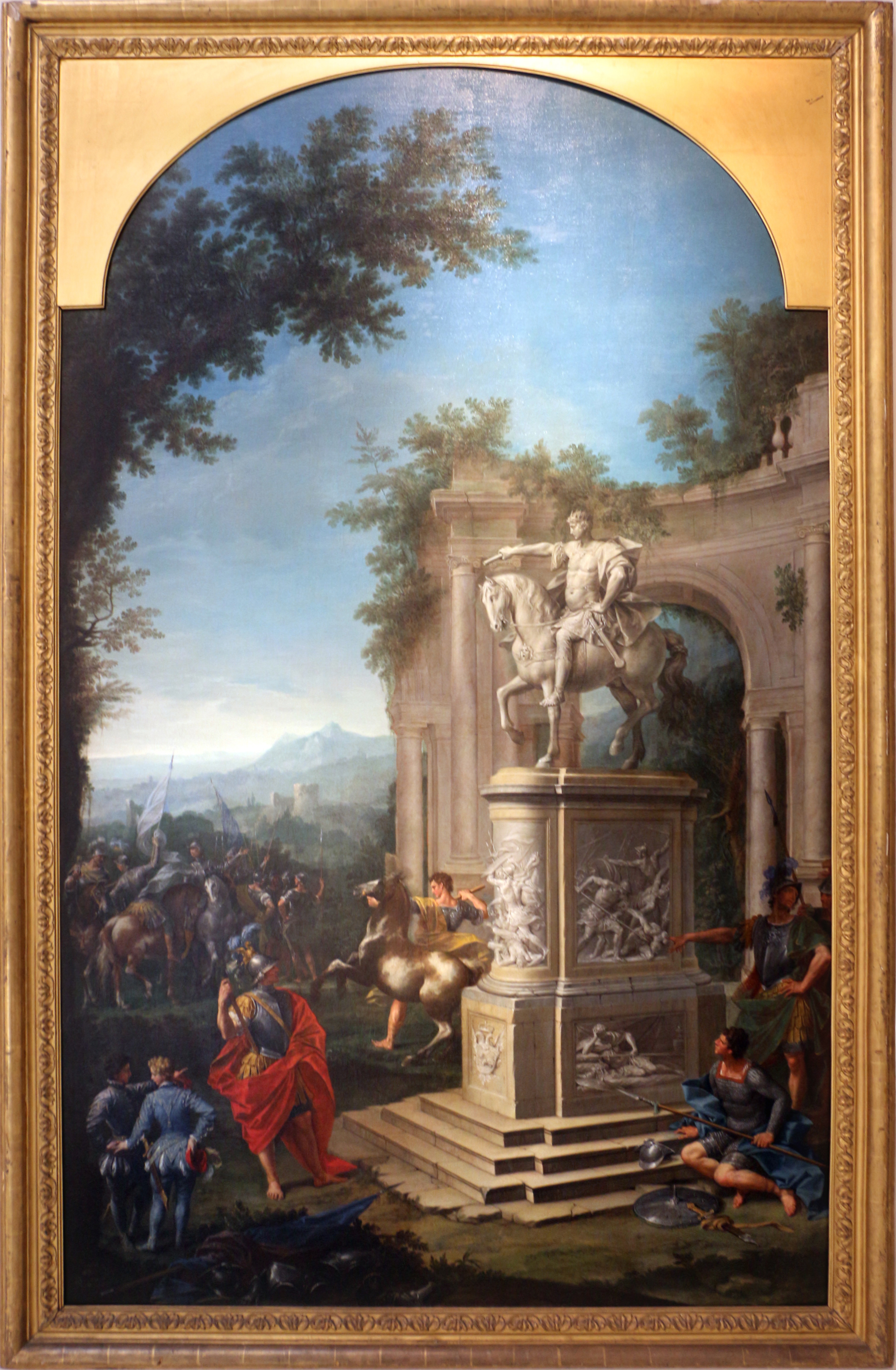
Tomb of the Duke of Marlborough, 1729; Pinacoteca Nazionale di Bologna

In the 1720s the Irish theatre impresario Owen Swiny promoted a plan for a series of large pictures, each dedicated to the memory of a British ‘worthy’ deceased in recent times and presenting his tomb with appropriate allegorical allusions to greatness. Swiny hired teams of Italian artists, and figure painters collaborated with landscape and architectural specialists. Venetian masters were prominent, among them Sebastiano and Marco Ricci, Giambattista Pittoni, Giovanni Battista Piazzetta and Canaletto. Creti contributed five pictures, the Tombs of Locke, Boyle and Sydenham and the Tomb of the Duke of Marlborough (both 1729; Pinacoteca Nazionale di Bologna), the Tomb of Joseph Addison and the Tomb of the Marquis of Wharton (both c. 1730; Rome, Villa Wolkonsky) and the Tomb of Charles Montagu, Count of Halifax (c. 1730; Rome, priv. col.), in which he collaborated principally with the Bolognese landscape and architectural painters Carlo Besoli (1709–54) and Nunzio Ferraiuoli. A volume of plates reproducing the pictures was planned, and in 1741 Tombeaux des princes, grands capitaines et autres hommes illustres qui ont fleuri dans la Grande Bretagne vers la fin du XVII et le commencement du XVIII siècle was published. Twenty-four plates were planned, but only nine, including engravings after Creti's two pictures in Bologna, were completed.

Creti was perhaps less successful in his large altarpieces, most of which were painted in his later years. Pictures such as the Virgin with Saint Ignazio (1737), the Charity of Saint Charles Borromeo (1740; both Bologna, San Pietro) and the Coronation of the Virgin (1740–45; Bologna, Santuario della Madonna di San Luca) lack the authority necessary to activate and unify such large, multifigured compositions. Creti's attempt to adapt an essentially classical idiom to the purpose of the religious art of the Counter-Reformation was not successful, for the beauty of the individual figure, so essential to his art, was not allowed sufficient autonomy.

In his later years Creti, whose nature was painfully sensitive, was afflicted with sleeplessness and depression. His most successful pupils were Ercole Graziani the Younger and Domenico Maria Fratta.

== Other works ==
- Cleopatra at Blanton Museum, Austin, Texas
- Alexander Threatened by his Father at the National Gallery of Art, Washington, D.C.
- Artemisia Drinking the Ashes of Mausolus at the National Gallery, London
- Achilles Handed over to Chiron at Palazzo d'Accursio, Bologna
- Education of Achilles at Palazzo d'Accursio, Bologna
- Mercury and Paris at Palazzo d'Accursio, Bologna
- Charity at Palazzo d'Accursio, Bologna
- Allegorical Tomb of Boyle, Locke, and Sydenham at Pinacoteca Nazionale di Bologna
- Allegorical Tomb of the Duke of Marlborough at Pinacoteca Nazionale di Bologna
- Landscape with Female Figures at Pinacoteca Nazionale di Bologna
- Visitation of the Virgin to Saint Elizabeth at Pinacoteca Nazionale di Bologna
- Achilles Dipped in the Styx at Pinacoteca Nazionale di Bologna

== Gallery ==
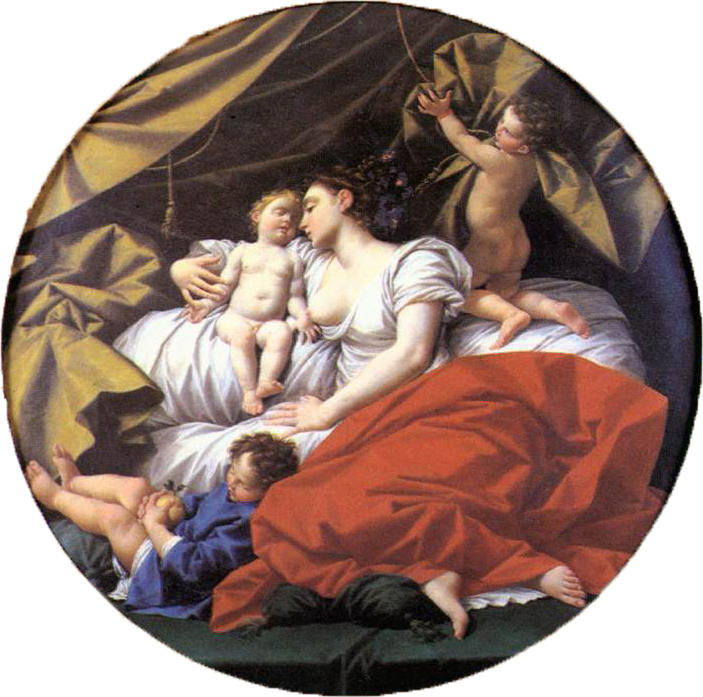
Charity

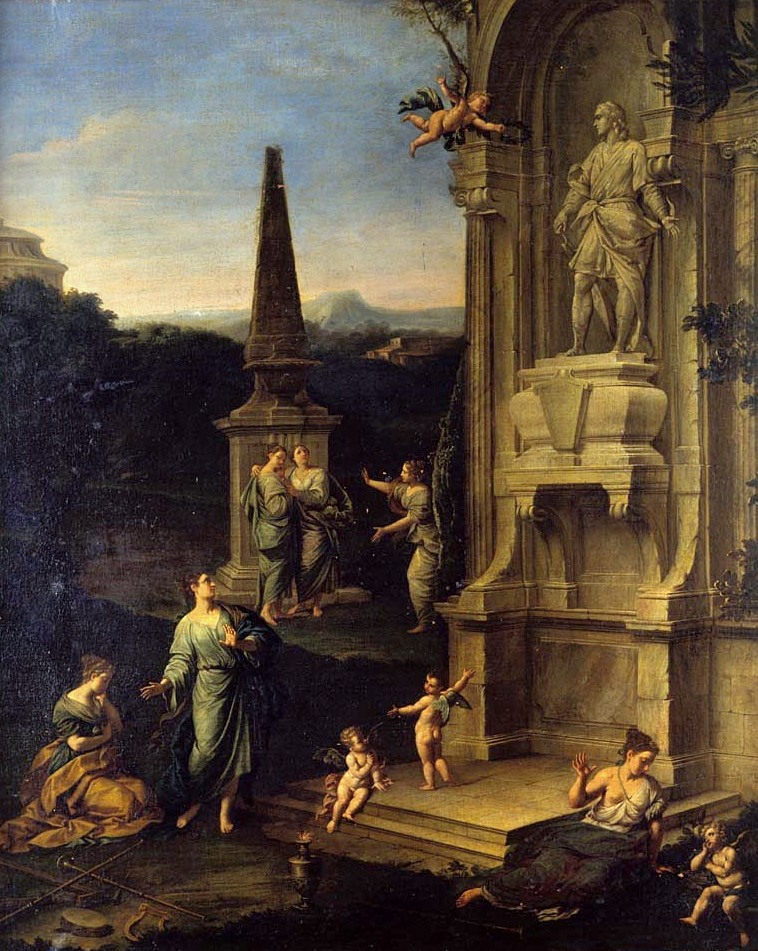
Allegorical Tomb of Joseph Addison

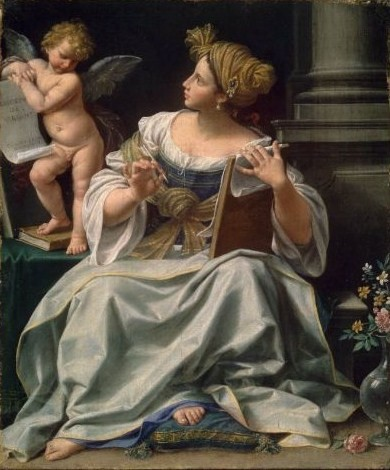
Cumaen Sybil

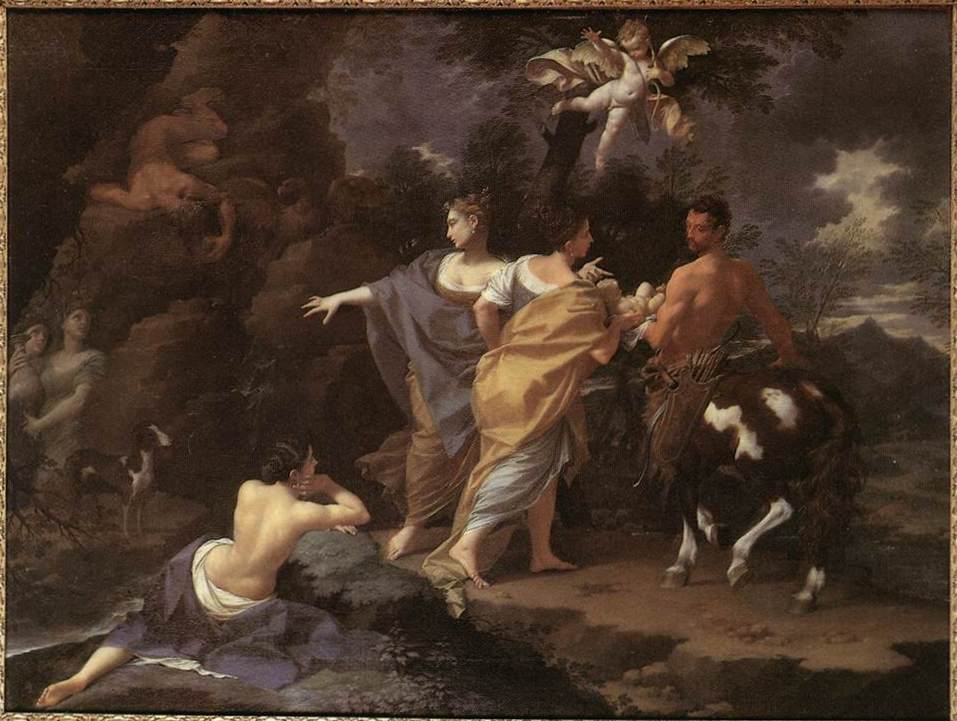
Achilles and Chiron

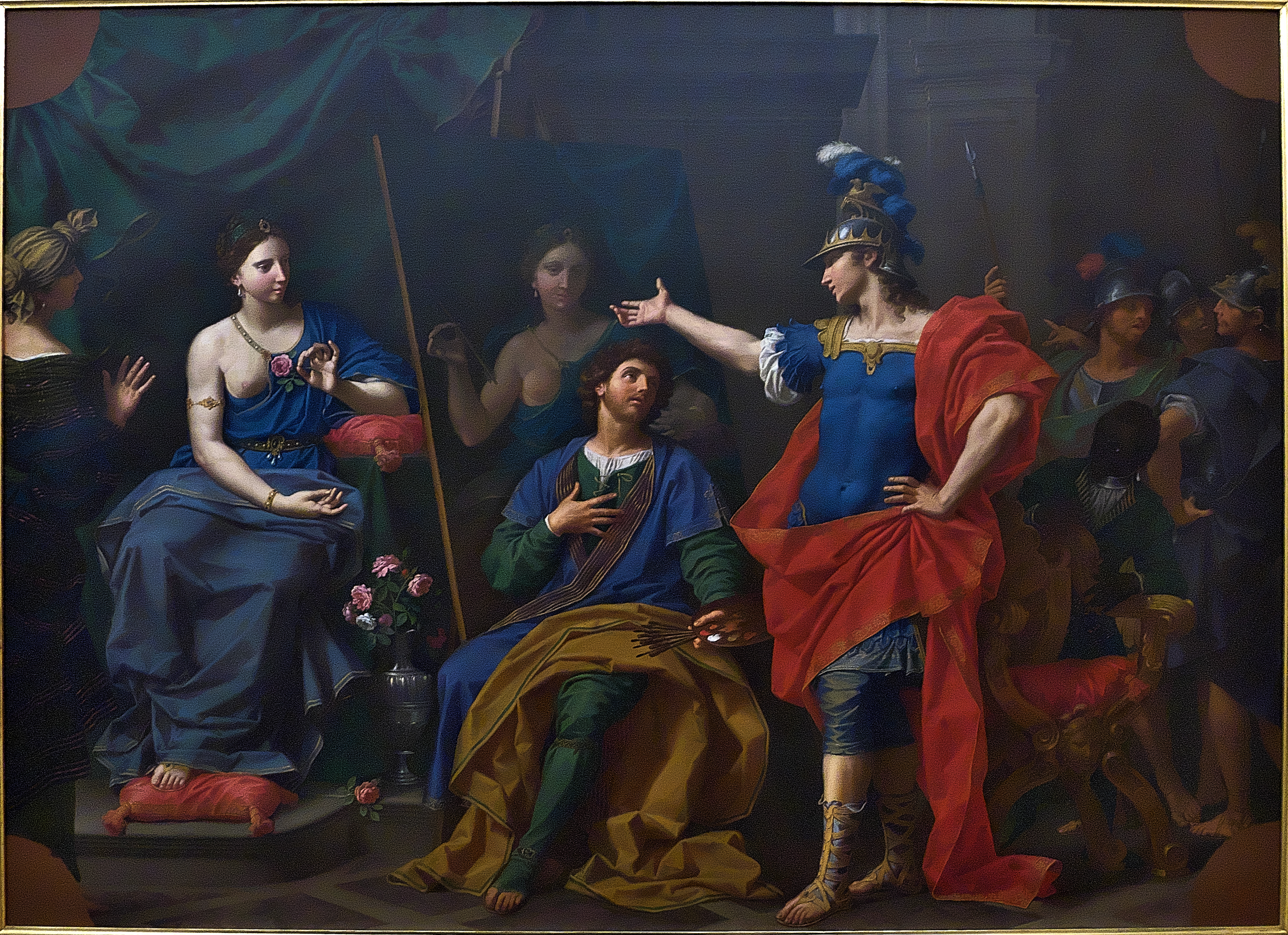
Alexander Ceding Campaspe to Apelles, 1741, Royal Palace of La Granja de San Ildefonso, Spain

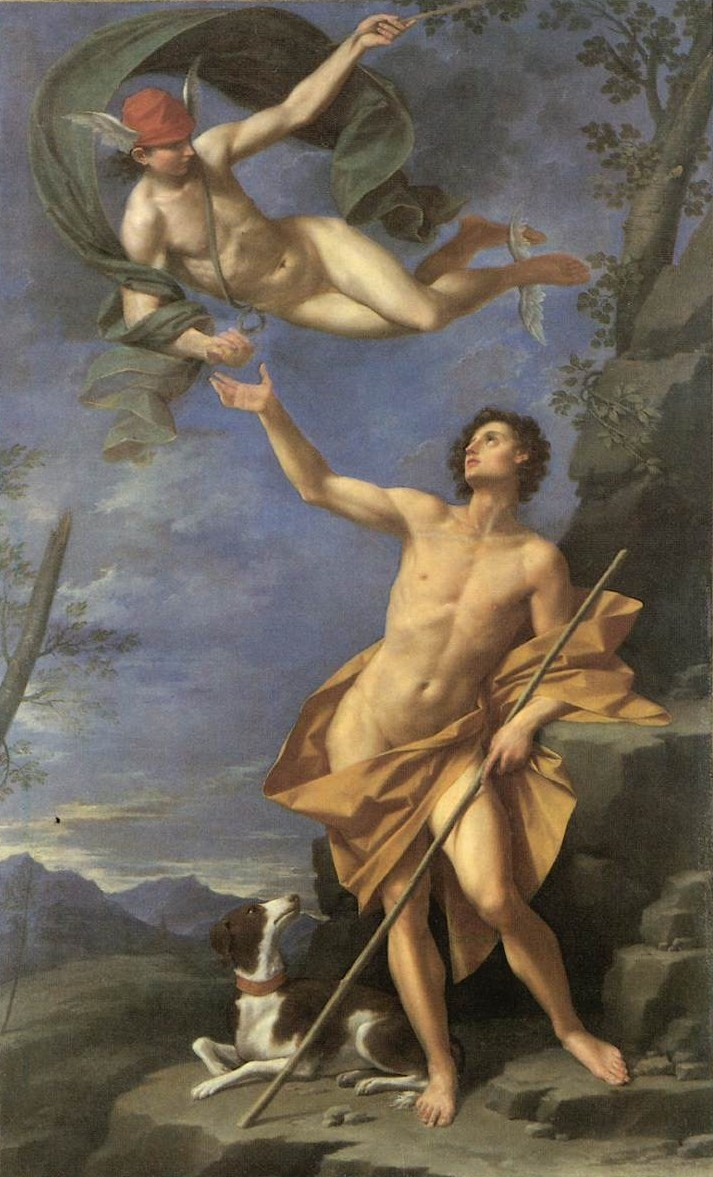
Mercury and Paris, 1745, Palazzo d'Accursio, Bologna

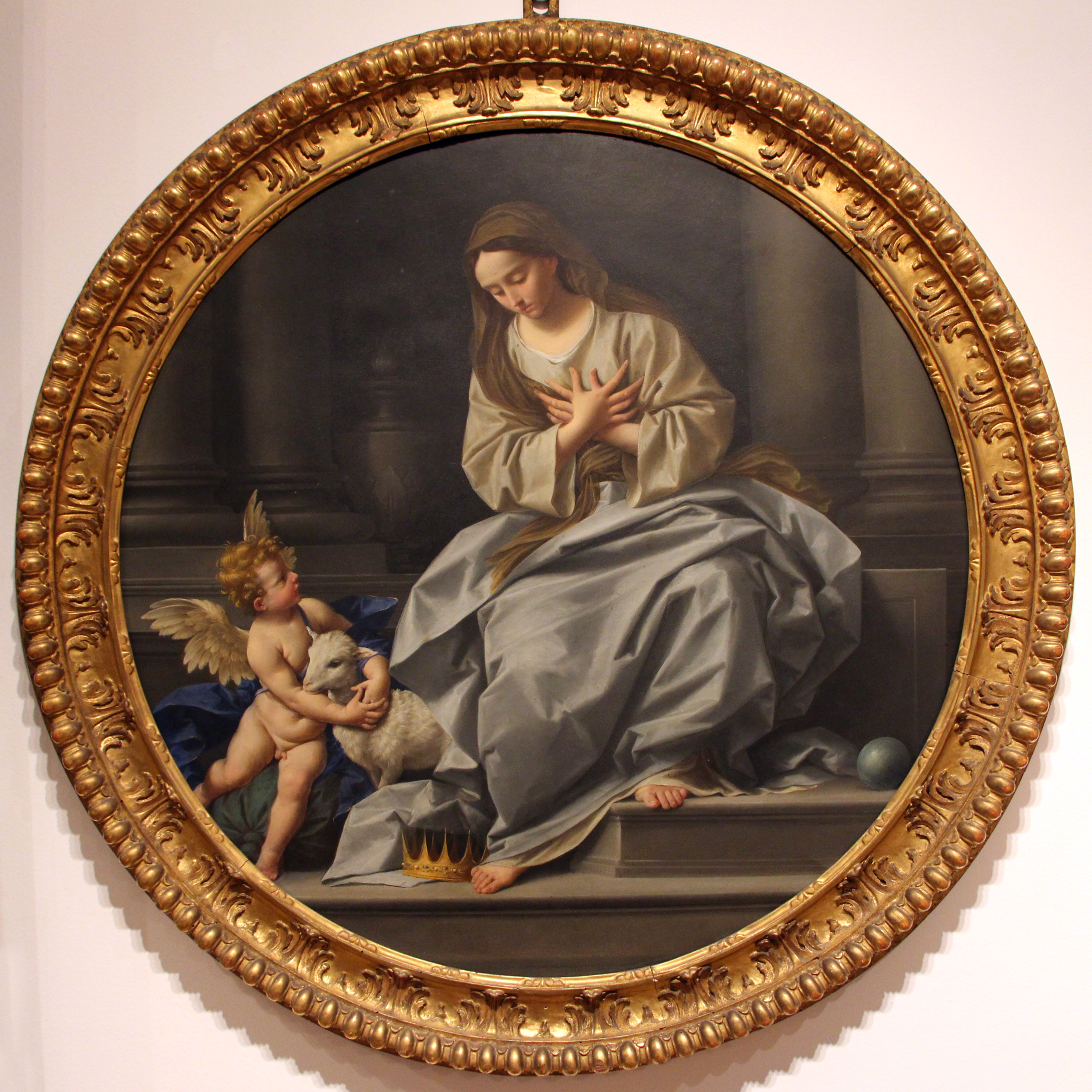
Humility

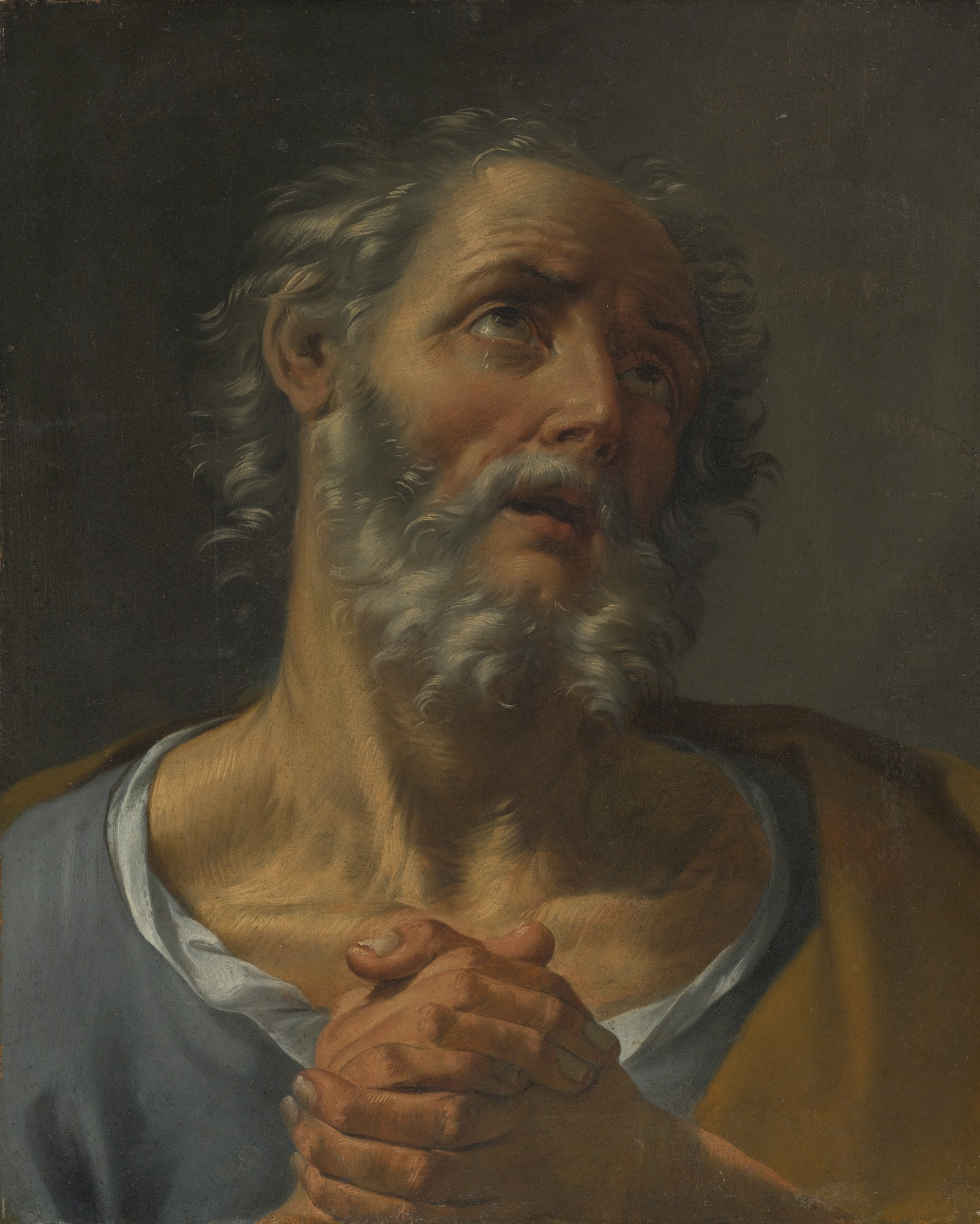
The Penitent Saint Peter

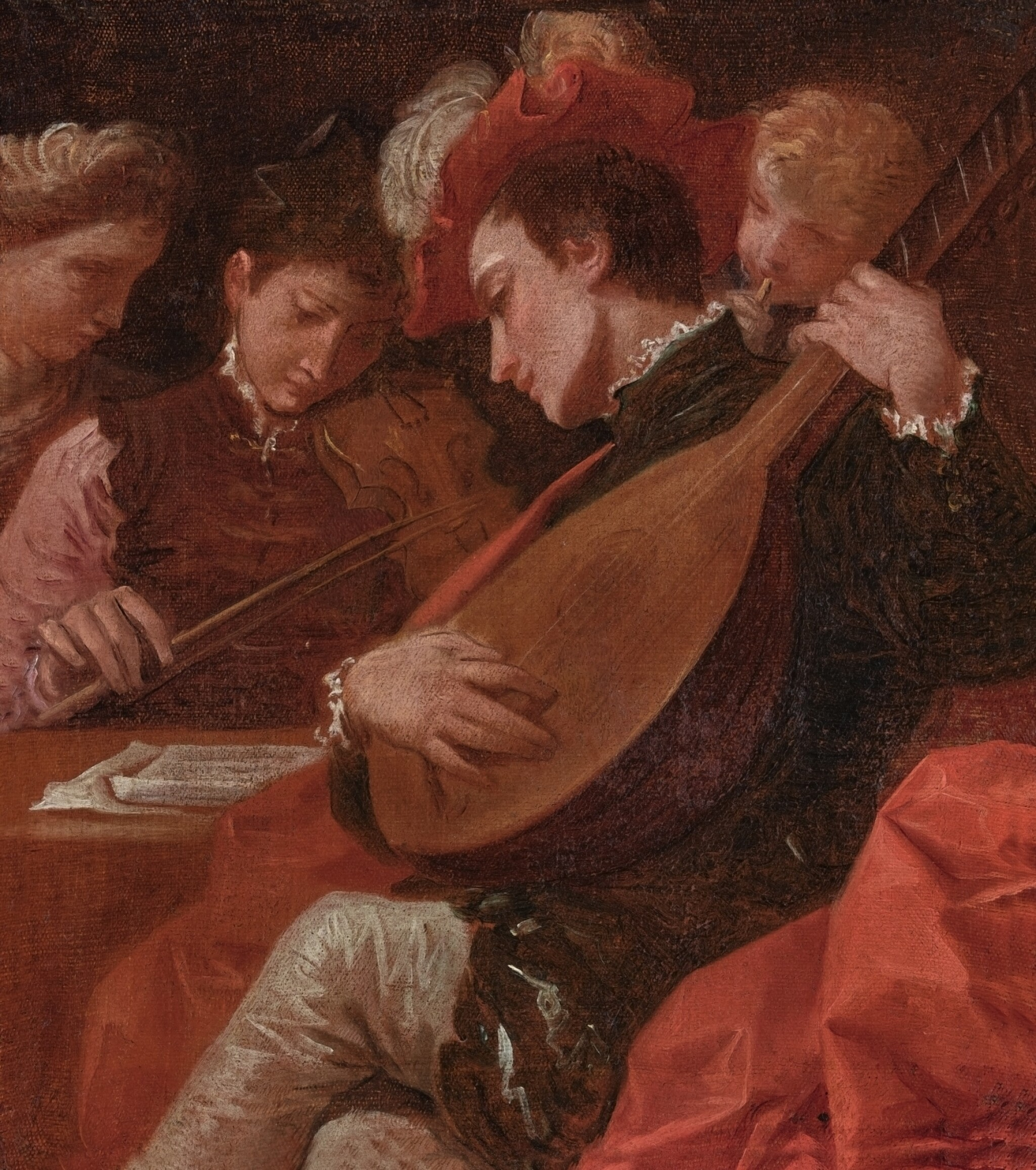
The Concert

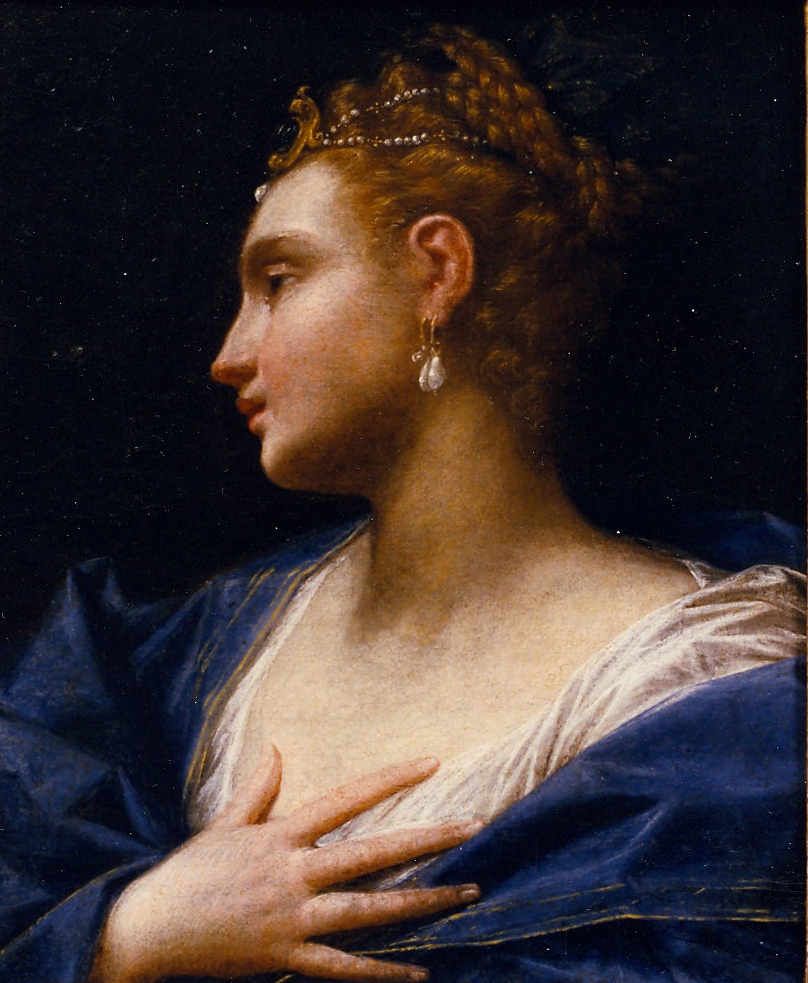
Testa di fanciulla riccamente abbigliata, Museo Civico di Modena

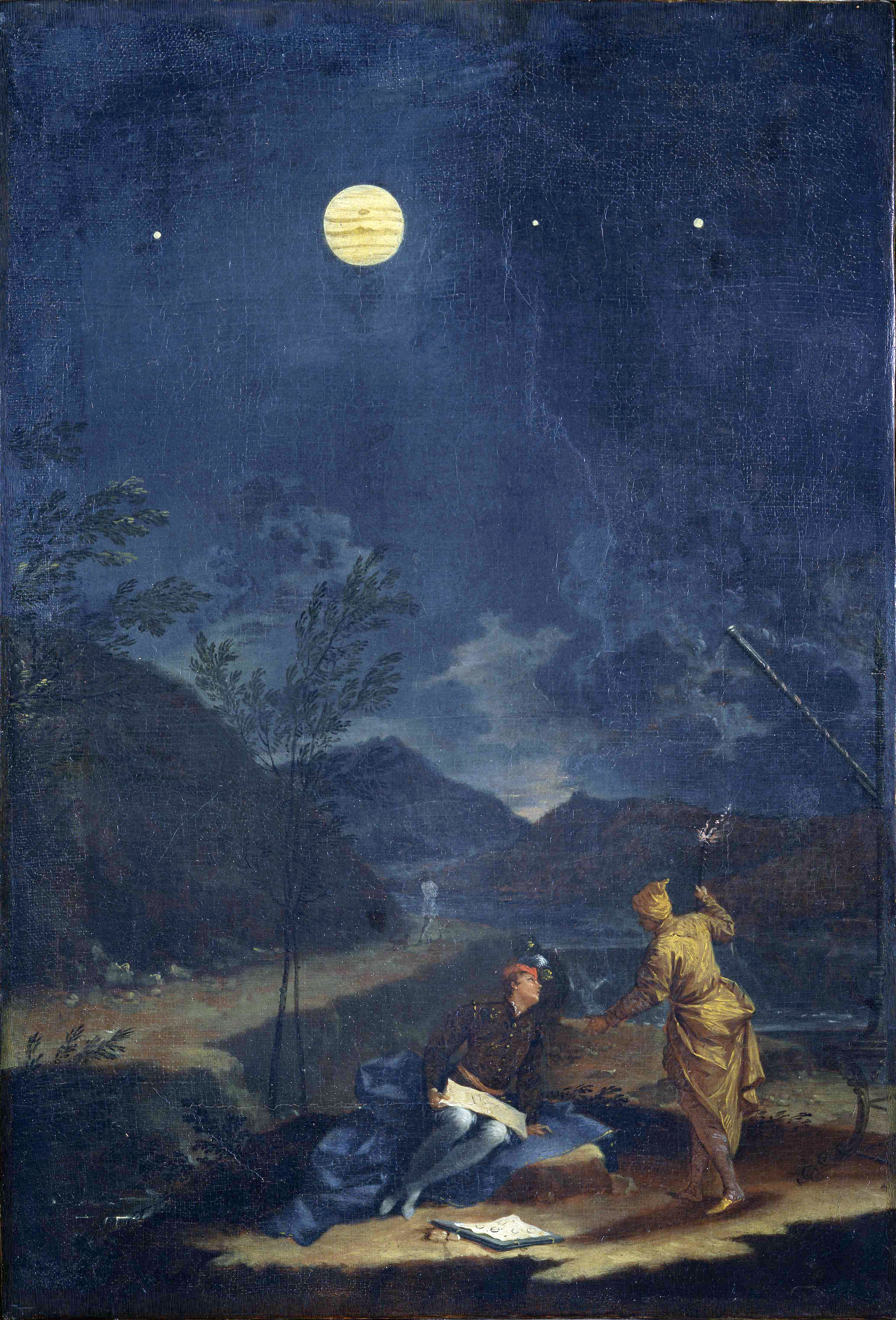
Astronomical Observations: Jupiter, 1711, Pinacoteca Vaticana, Rome

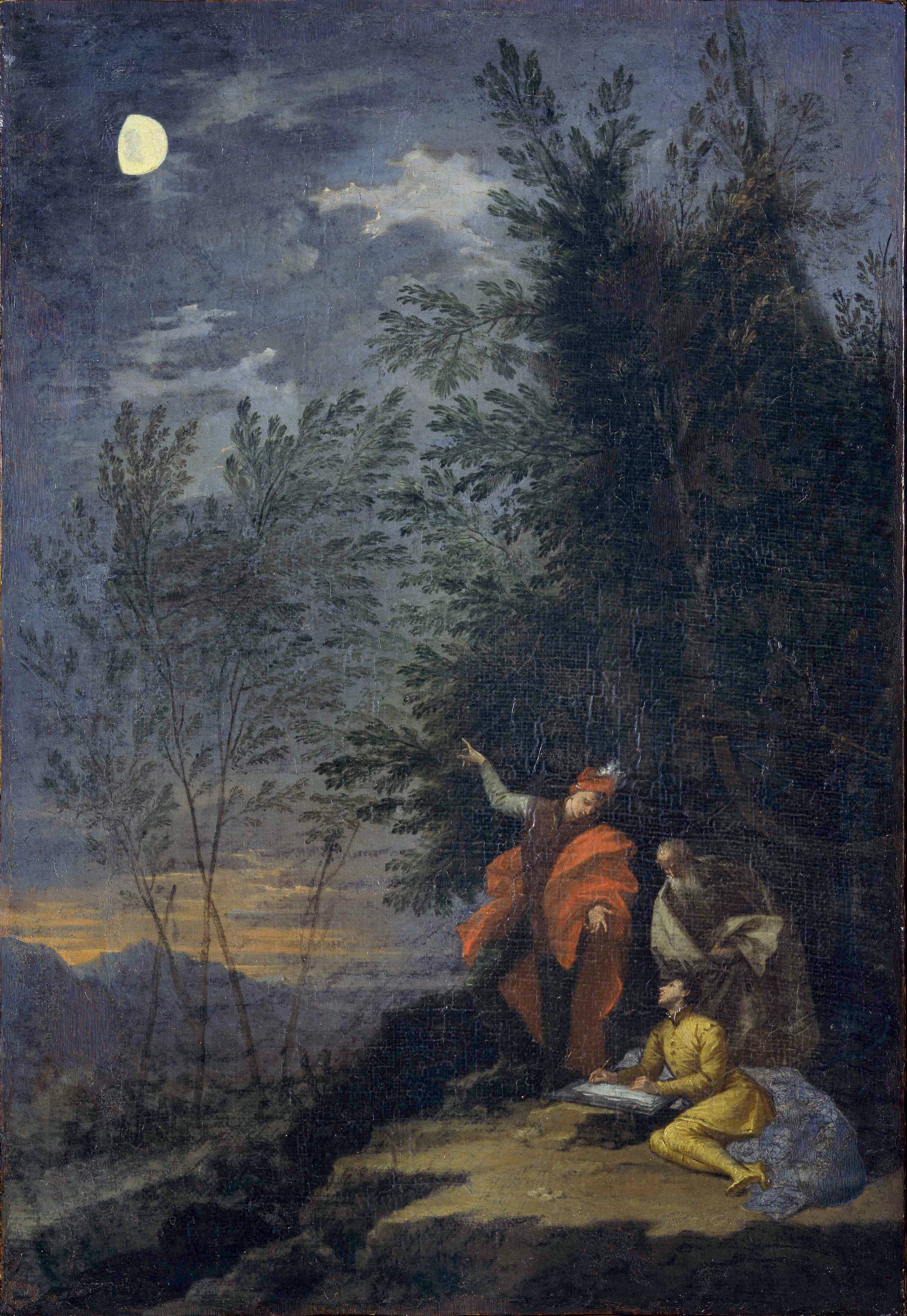
Astronomical Observations: Mars, 1711, Pinacoteca Vaticana, Rome

== See also ==
- Sebastiano Conca
- Jacopo Zoboli
- Aureliano Milani
- Francesco Monti
- Pompeo Batoni

== Bibliography ==
- Zanotti, Giampietro (1739). Storia dell’Accademia Clementina di Bologna. Bologna. Vol. 1, pp. 17, 100; Vol. 2, pp. 98–122.
- Crespi, Luigi (1769). Vite de' pittori bolognesi non descritte nella 'Felsina pittrice'. Rome. pp. 257–9.
- Lanzi, Luigi (1816). Storia pittorica della Italia. Vol. 5. Pisa. pp. 177–9.
- Longhi, Roberto (1935). "Momenti della pittura bolognese". Archiginnasio. 30: 111–35.
- Wittkower, Rudolf (1993). Pelican History of Art (ed.). Art and Architecture Italy, 1600-1750. 1980. Penguin Books Ltd. pp. 471–2.
