= Carlo Cesare Giovannini =

Italian painter (1695–1758)

Carlo Cesare Giovannini (1695 in Parma – 1758) was an Italian painter of the Baroque period. He was the son of Giacomo Giovannini, a Bolognese painter. He moved in 1723 to Bologna and trained with Marcantonio Franceschini. In Gaulandi's Memorie, there is a testament he gave asserting the Raphael painting in Parma was genuine.
