= Fratte =

Fratte may refer to several places in Italy:

- Fratte, ancient name of Ausonia, a municipality of the Province of Frosinone, Lazio
- Fratte, a suburban quarter of Salerno, Campania
- Fratte, a civil parish of Santa Giustina in Colle (PD), Veneto
- Fratte Rosa, a municipality of the Province of Pesaro and Urbino, Marche
- Sant'Angelo Le Fratte, a municipality of the Province of Potenza, Basilicata
- Sant'Andrea delle Fratte, a basilica church in Rome

== See also ==
- Fratta (disambiguation)
