= Gentile Zanardi =

Italian artist

Gentile Zanardi (late 17th century) was an Italian painter, active in the Baroque period in Bologna.

Zanardi was a disciple of Marcantonio Franceschini. Giovanni Paolo Zanardi (active 1658–1669) was Gentile's brother. Her father Giulio (1639–1694) was also a Bolognese painter. She married Sebastiano Monci, a quadratura painter who had been a pupil of Agostino Metelli Senior.
