= Pietro Francesco Prina =

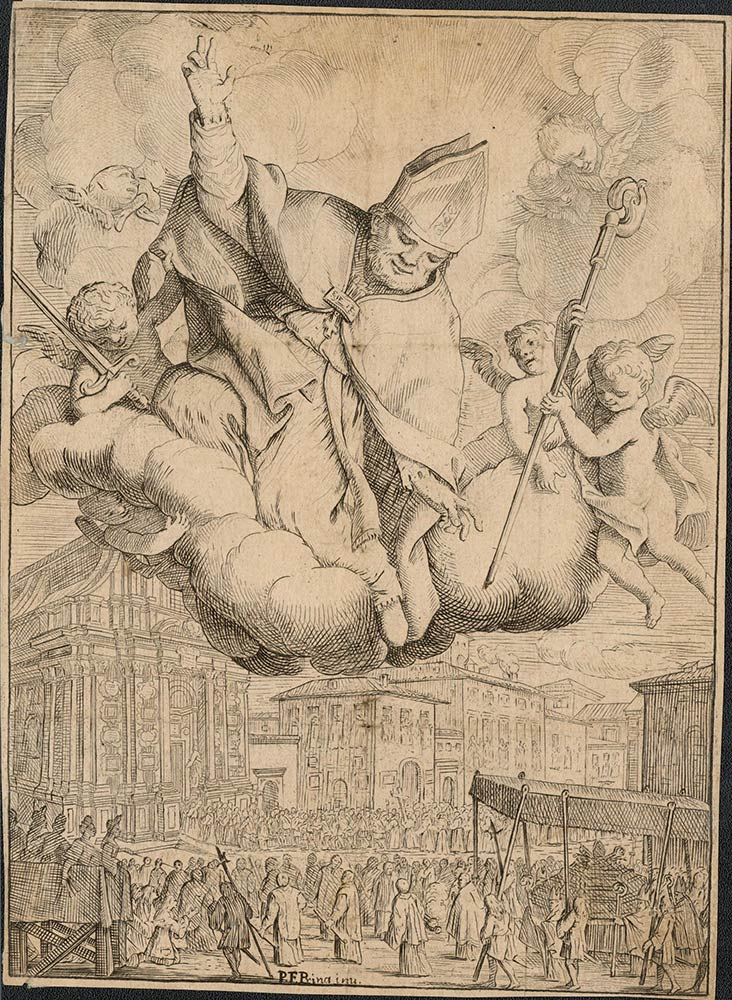
The Triumph of Saint Gaudentius, print, 1711

Pietro Francesco Prina (1647 – 1727) was born in Novara and was an Italian engraver, active in Milan. He trained with Marc Antonio Franceschini in Bologna. He engraved history scenes and capricci.

== Gallery ==
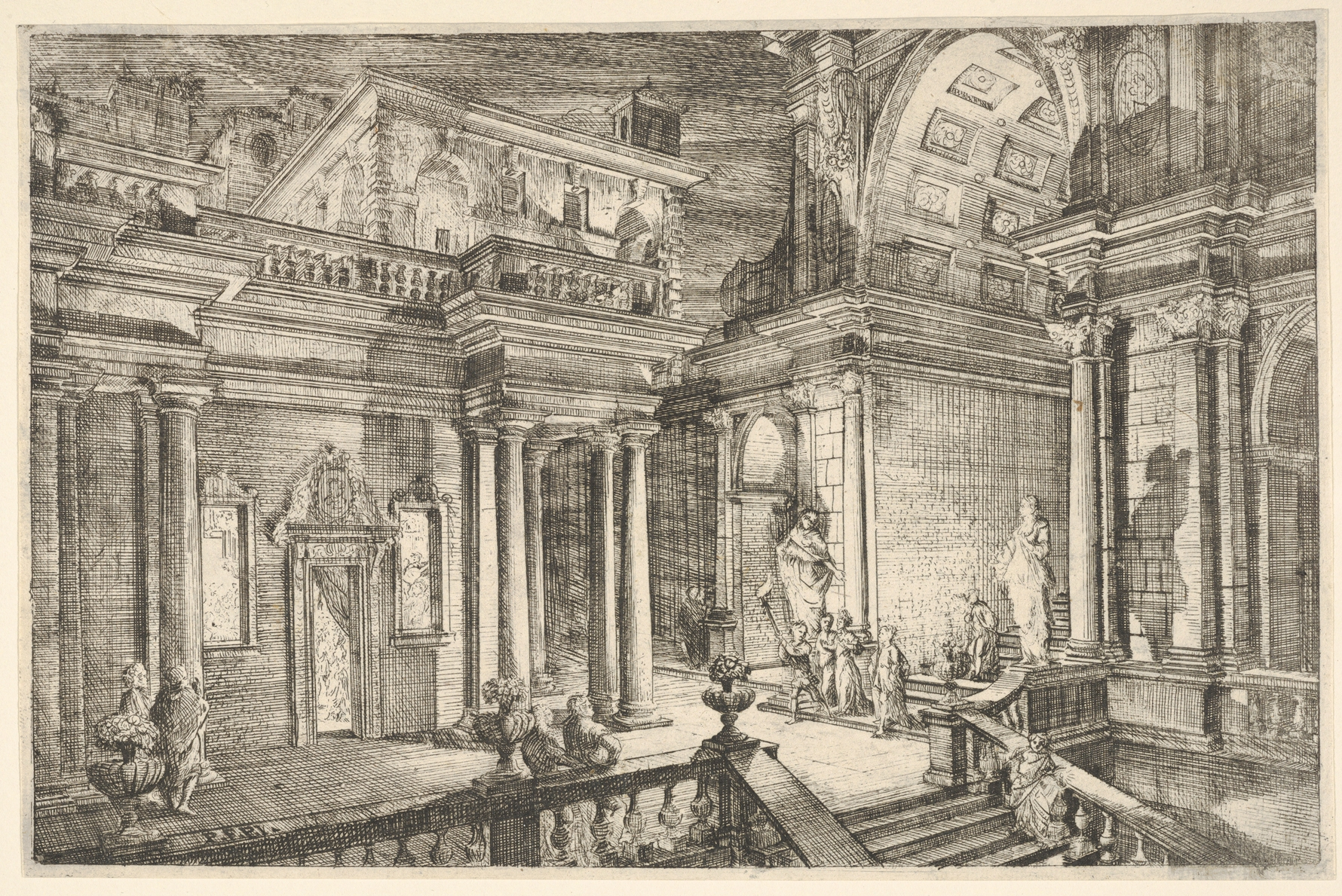
Interior of a Classical Building Showing People Engaged in Conversation

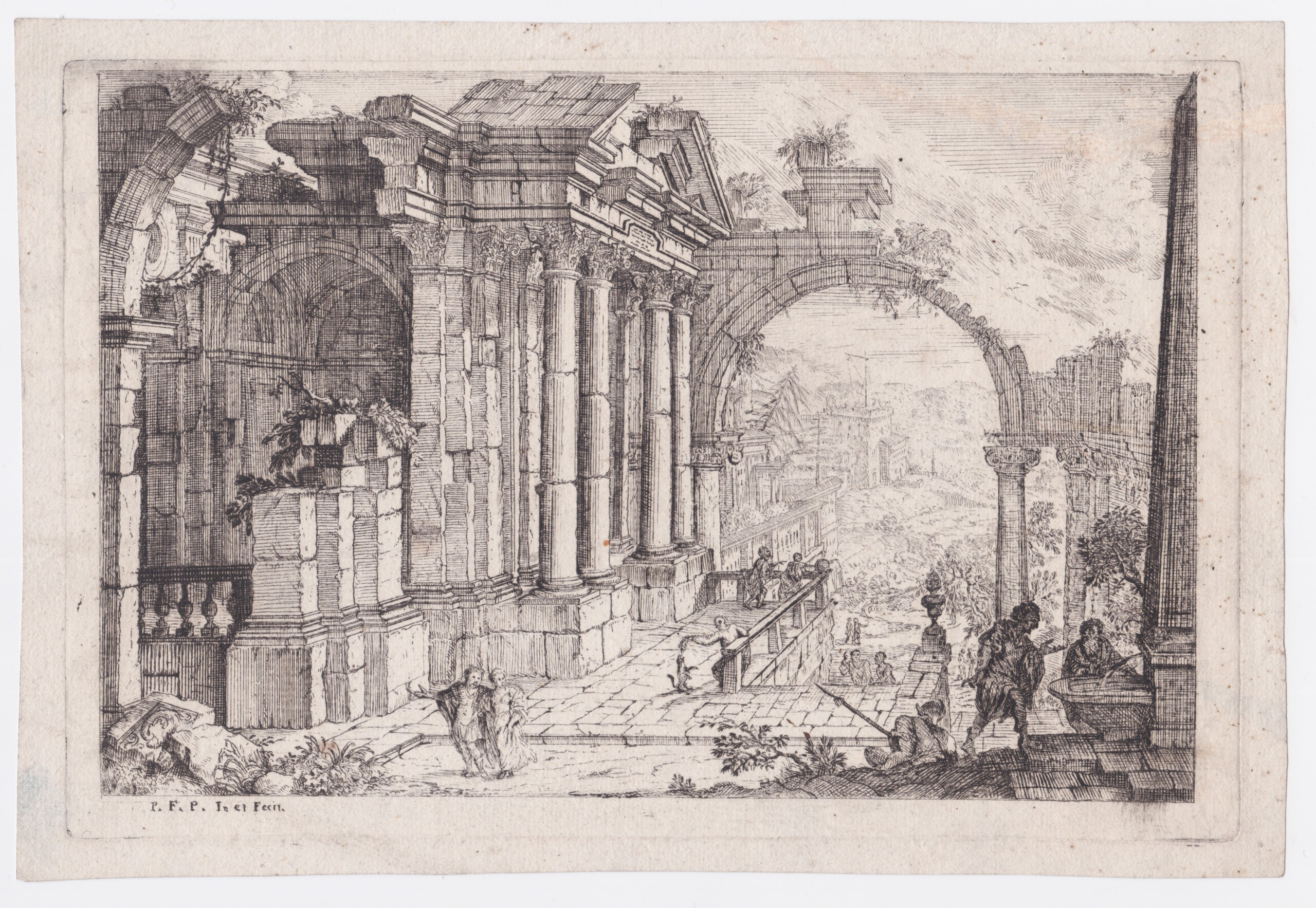
Architectural Capriccio
