= Giacomo Franceschini =

Italian painter (1672–1745)

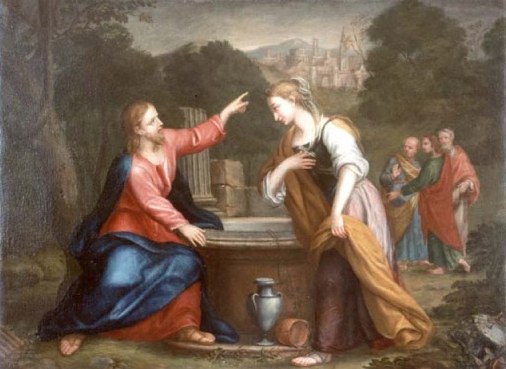
The Water of Life Discourse between Jesus and the Samaritan woman at the well, by Giacomo Franceschini, 17th-18th century

Giacomo Franceschini (1672–1745) (also called Jacopo Franceschini) was an Italian painter.

He was the son and scholar of Marc Antonio Franceschini, was born at Bologna in 1672. He painted historical pictures in the style of his father, and there are some of his works in the churches at Bologna. In Santa Maria Incoronata is a picture of St. Usualdo, St. Margaret, St. Lucy, and St. Cecilia; in San Simone, The Crucifixion; and in San Martino, St. Anne. Franceschini died at Bologna in 1745. Giuseppe Pedretti was one of his students.

== Sources ==
- Artist data
- Arte Antica

Attribution:
