= Girolamo Gatti =

Italian painter

Girolamo Gatti (1682–1726) was an Italian painter of the Baroque period, active mainly in Bologna. He was a pupil of the painter Marcantonio Franceschini. He painted Mystical night of Saint Theresa with Saints Andrea Corsini and Ursula for the church of the Carmine in Medicina. He was a member of the Accademia Clementina.
