= Pietro Antonio Avanizi =

Italian painter

Pietro Antonio Avanizi (died 1733) was an Italian painter of the Baroque period, active in Piacenza. He was born in Parma, and trained with Marcantonio Franceschini.
