= George Barret =

George Barret may refer to:

- George Barret Sr. (c. 1730–1784) Irish landscape painter
- George Barret Jr. (1767–1842), English landscape painter, son of George Barret, Sr.
- George Barrett (actuary) (1752–1821), English actuary
- George Barrett (jockey) (1863–1898), English jockey

== See also ==
- George Barrett (disambiguation)
