= Giuseppe Pedretti =

Italian painter (1697–1778)

Giuseppe Pedretti (26 February 1697 – 27 May 1778) was an Italian painter of the late-Baroque or Rococo period, active mainly in Bologna.

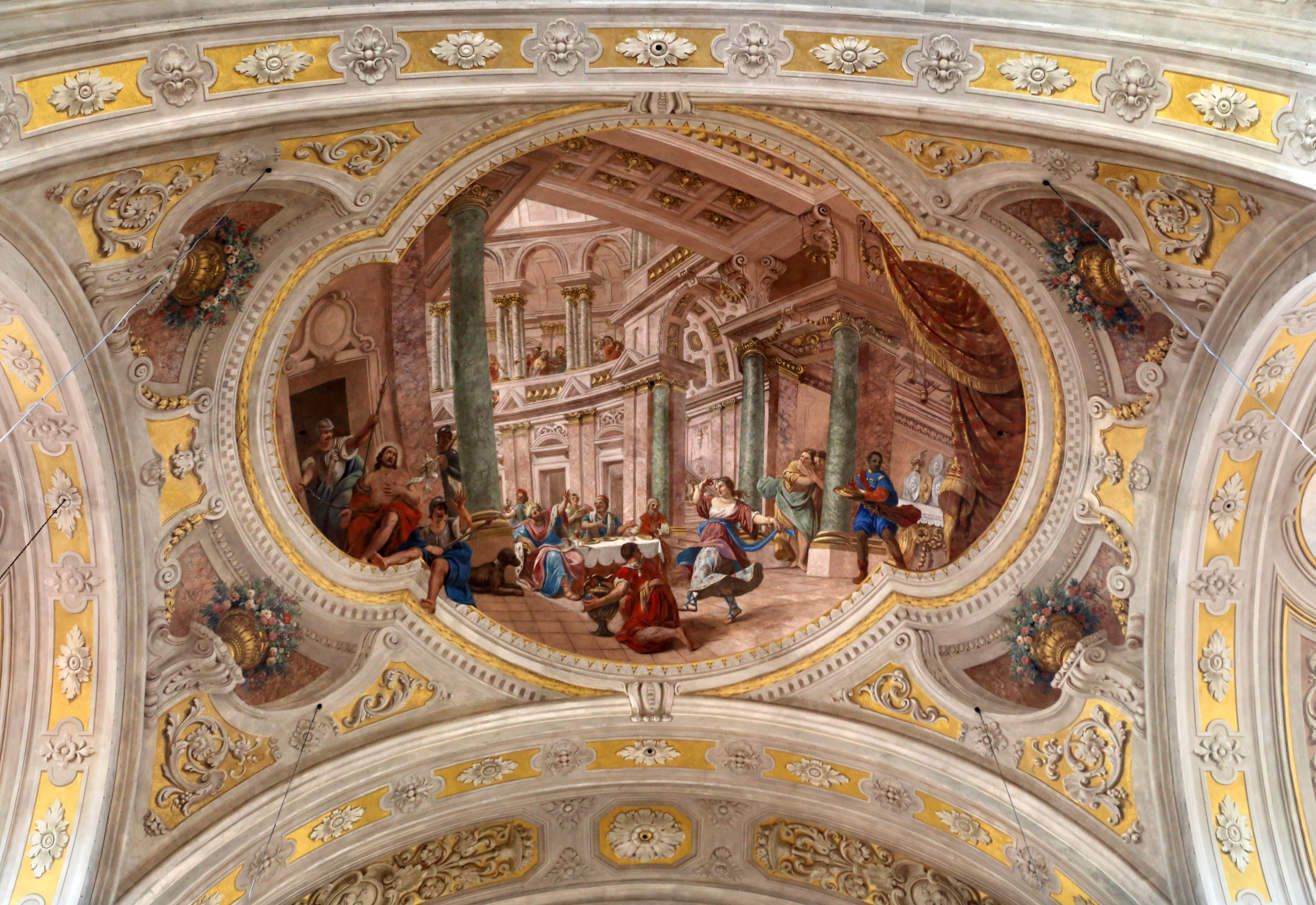
Chiesa di San Giovanni Battista a Minerbio - storie del Battista

== Biography ==
Born in Bologna, at the age of 15, he began his training, despite the opposition of his family, under Carlo Antonio Rambaldi. When Rambaldi left for Turin in 1714, he moved to work under Marcantonio Franceschini and his son Giacomo Franceschini. He stayed in that studio till 1729.

In 1729, he moved for three years to Poland, to paint for the House of Rzewuski in Lviv, where he completed a number of portraits and frescoes on sacred subjects for the Carmelite Church.

After a spell in Mantua, Sabbioneta, and Viadana, between 1726 and 1727, he was commissioned by Antonio Cavazza to paint Joseph retrieves the Silver Cup from Benjamin's Bag (now in Credito Romagnolo, Palazzo Magnani, Bologna).

In 1732, he returned to Bologna, and in 1739, he joined the Accademia Clementina. In 1744, he painted a Madonna and Saints Anthony Abbot and Vitale in the parish of San Vitale di Calderara, and afterwards frescoes depicting the Martyrdom of San Procolo in the choir of the church of San Procolo, Bologna. In 1761, he painted the portrait of Padre Giuseppe Bentivoglio (Convent of San Giuseppe, Bologna) and in 1766 he exhibited in San Domenico three canvases depicting the Life of San Vincenzo Ferrer.

Pedretti painted lunettes in the nave for the church of Basilica of San Domenico in Bologna. He painted altarpieces in the church of the Immaculate Conception of Crevalcore. One of his pupils was the wax sculptor Anna Morandi Manzolini.

He was named a member of the Accademia Clementina, and elected twice, the "prince" of the academy (1754 and 1770). His son, Vincenzo Pedretti, was also a figure painter in Bologna.
