= Gaspare Venturini =

Italian painter

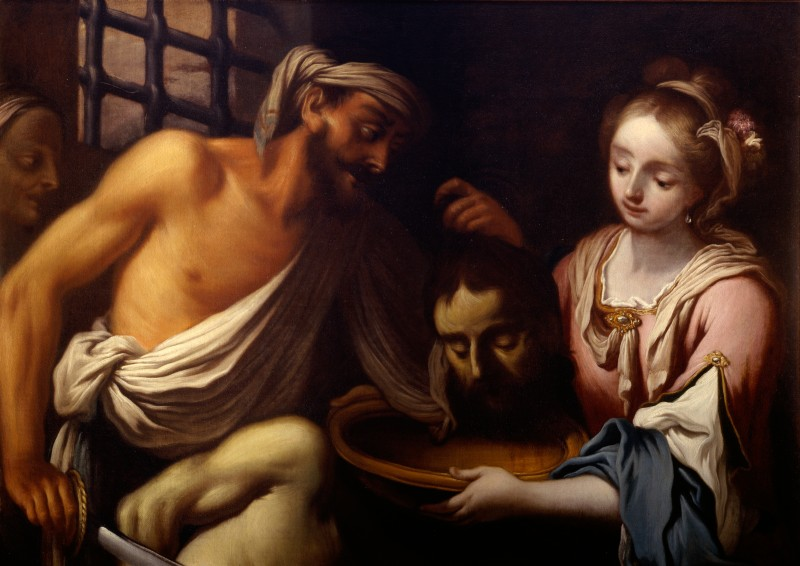
Decollazione di San Giovanni Battista (Fondazione Cariplo)

Gaspare Venturini (Ferrara, documented between 1576 and 1593) was an Italian painter.

== Biography ==
Venturini was trained in the school of Ferrarese Mannerism together with Bastarolo and Scarsellino, his associates together with the Carracci in the decoration of the ceilings of the Palazzo dei Diamanti over the decade between 1580 and 1590. Late 16th-century in style and rooted in the area of Ferrara, Venturini works are of mostly a religious character, as exemplified by the altarpieces for the church of the Madonnina and the Miracle of Saint Apollinaris in San Cristoforo della Certosa.

== Other projects ==
Media related to Gaspare Venturini at Wikimedia Commons
