= Domenico Maria Fratta =

Italian painter

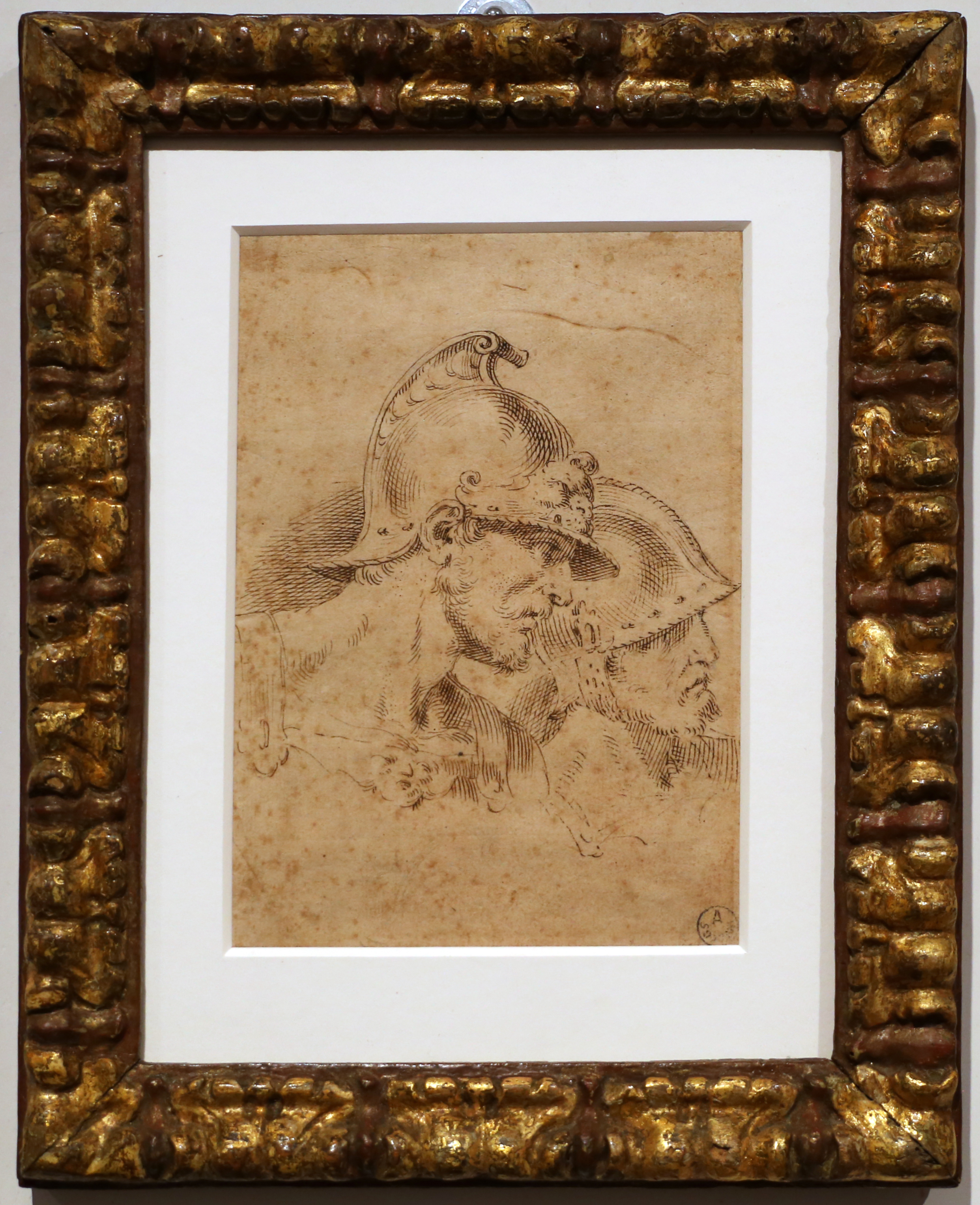

Domenico Maria Fratta (1696–1763) was an Italian painter and engraver, active in his native Bologna.

He studied under Giovanni Maria Viani, Carlo Rambaldi, and Donato Creti. He abandoned the art of painting, and devoted himself entirely to engraving, in which he gained widespread fame. He became a member of the Accademia Clementina.
