= Francesco Monti =

Francesco Monti may refer to:

- Francesco Monti (il Brescianino) (1646–1712)
- Francesco Monti (Bologna) (1683–1768)
