= 1570 Ferrara earthquake =

Earthquake in Italy

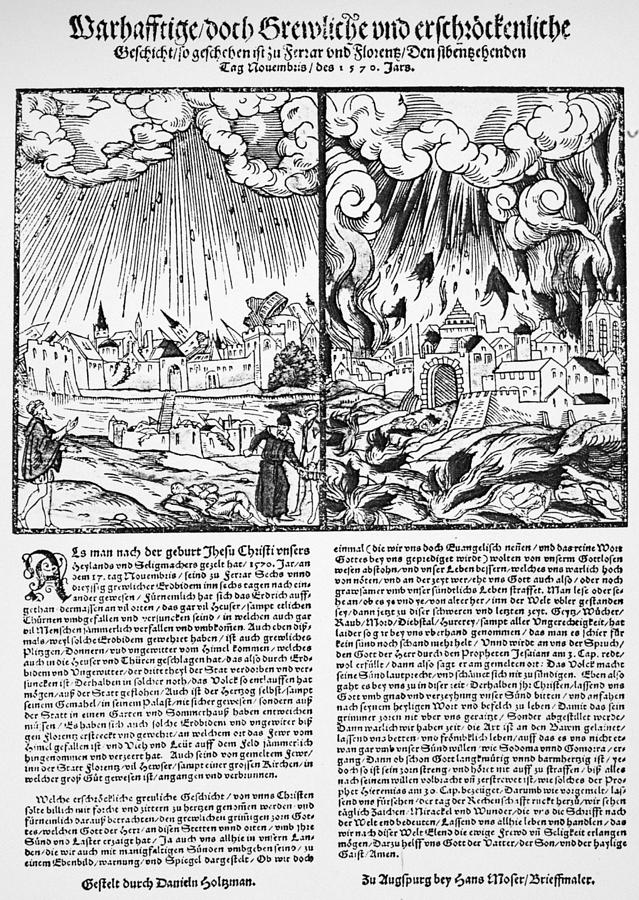

- Location within Alps
- Local date: November 17, 1570
- Local time: 03:00
- Magnitude: 5.5 M_{l}
- Epicenter: 44.817°N 11.633°E
- Areas affected: Italy, Ferrara
- Casualties: 171

The 1570 Ferrara earthquake struck the Italian city of Ferrara on November 16 and 17, 1570. After the initial shocks, a sequence of aftershocks continued for four years, with over 2,000 in the period from November 1570 to February 1571.

The same area was struck, centuries later, by another major earthquake of comparable intensity.

The disaster destroyed half the city, permanently marked many of the buildings left standing, and directly contributed to – but was not the sole cause of – a long-term decline of the city lasting until the 19th century.

The earthquake caused the first documented episode of soil liquefaction in the Po Valley, and one of the oldest occurrences of the event known outside of paleoseismology. It led to the establishment of an earthquake observatory which published to very high regard, and the drafting of some of the first-known building designs based on a scientific seismic-resistant approach.

== Geology ==
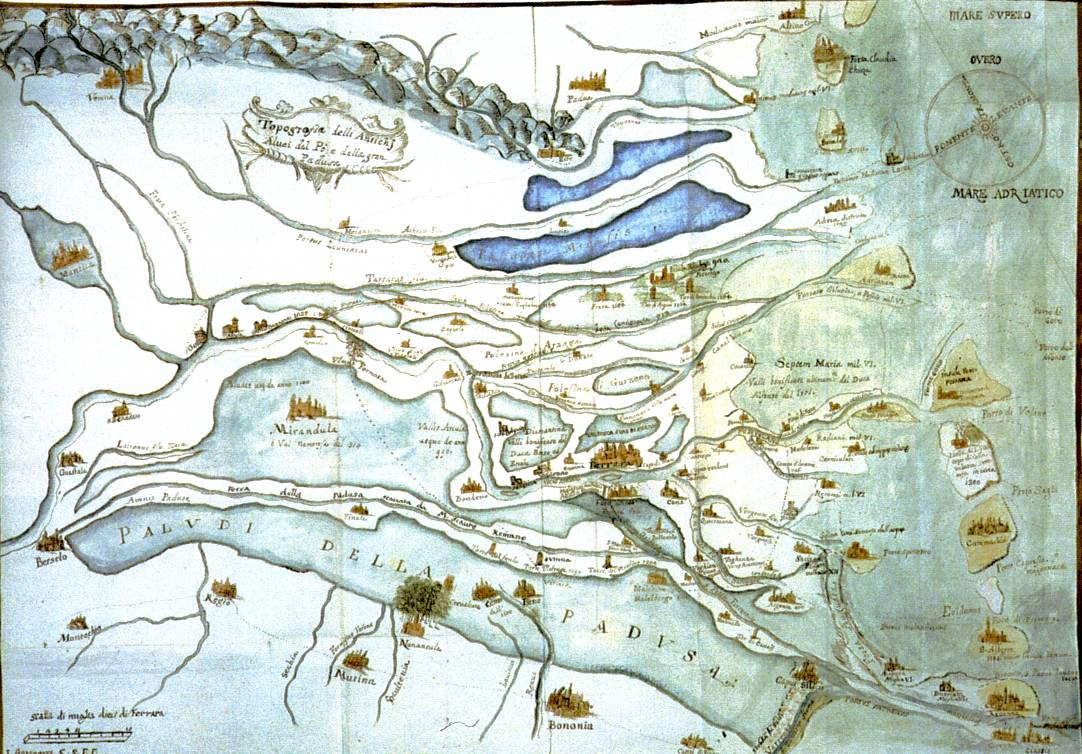
Map of Valle Padusa (1570)

The Po Plain, which is a foreland basin formed by the downflexing of the crust by the loading of the Apennine thrust sheets, overlies and mainly conceals the active front of the Northern Apennines fold and thrust belt, across which there is about 1 mm per year of active shortening at present. Information from hydrocarbon exploration demonstrates that the area is underlain by a series of active thrust faults and related folds, some of which have been detected from anomalous drainage patterns. These blind thrust faults are roughly west-northwest–east-southeast-trending, parallel to the mountain front, and dip shallowly towards the south-southwest. The 1570 earthquake has been linked to movement on the outermost and northernmost of these thrusts.

== Ferrara ==
=== The city ===
Ferrara is located on the Emilian side of the Po Valley, an alluvial plain geologically quite stable since the Messinian age (7-5 mya). Small earthquakes are common, albeit not frequent, but rarely lead to considerable damage to the urban cityscape. Ferrara was the location for minor earthquakes in the four centuries before 1570, these events being recorded in the city archives with detailed descriptions of damage to buildings and depositions by witnesses.

At the time of the 1570 event, it was a medium-sized city, with 32,000 inhabitants.

Despite continuous – and often victorious – wars against the age's superpowers, the nearby Venice and the Papal States, Ferrara in the 16th century was a thriving city, a major hub for trade, business and liberal arts. World class music and painting schools, linked with Flemish artistic communities, were established in the late 15th and early 16th century, under the patronage of the House of Este. Musical instrument workshops, and especially the making of lutes, were a pride of the city and were considered preeminent.

A new part of the city, named Addizione Erculea (Erculean Addition) had been built in the previous century: it is commonly considered one of the major examples of urban planning in the Renaissance, the biggest and most architecturally advanced town expansion project in Europe at the time.

=== Political, economical and religious situation ===
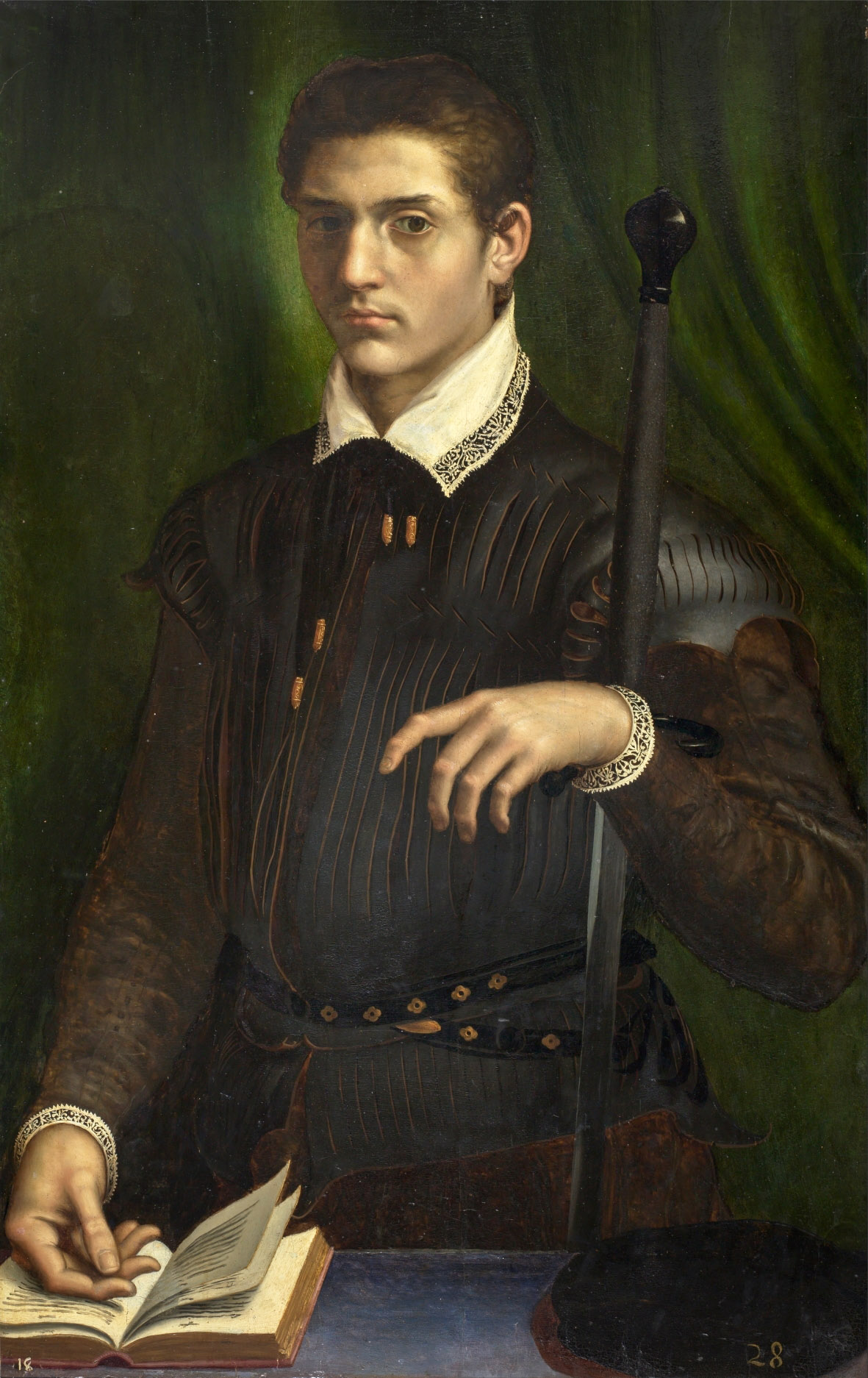
Alfonso II d'Este, by Girolamo da Carpi (Museo del Prado, Madrid)

In 1570 the city was held by Alfonso II d'Este, Duke of Ferrara, vassal of Pope Pius V, a beloved ruler and a devoted liberal art patron, but careless and a big spender as an administrator. Alfonso was the main sponsor of many artists including Torquato Tasso, Giovanni Battista Guarini, Luzzasco Luzzaschi and Cesare Cremonini, confirming the reputation of Ferrara as a haven for artists and freethinkers. The emerging of the city as a cultural powerhouse came at the cost of a sharp increase in taxes.

The city was a safe refuge for Jews and converts from the persistent prosecutions promoted by the Roman Catholic Church. Despite Alfonso II's formal status as a vassal of the Holy Seat, he never took any action against the two thousand Jews living in the city walls, well knowing that the Hebrew community accounted for a strong share of the city cultural and economic success. His disregard of the Holy Seat's orders made him more than one enemy.

Even if he were walking on a thin line, Alfonso managed to avoid the Papacy's many diplomatic and legal challenges to the city independence, thanks to cunning politics and a strong friendship with the powerful Charles IX of France. It is to be remembered that Alfonso II was the son of Renée of France, member of the House of Valois, declared heretic and guilty of housing John Calvin himself under the eyes of the Catholics.

Alfonso was not new to compromises: to smooth his frequent brushes with the Pope, he was usually attending masses and acting as a good Catholic in public, receiving communion, giving substantial sums to charity, arranging religious parades for saints and building convents.

Both the high taxation, and the soft stance with the Jews ultimately gained him hostility in the most die-hard Catholic part of the population, which supported an acquisition of the city and its lands by the Holy Seat. Those rebel fringes were instrumental in the political struggle following the disaster.

== The earthquake ==
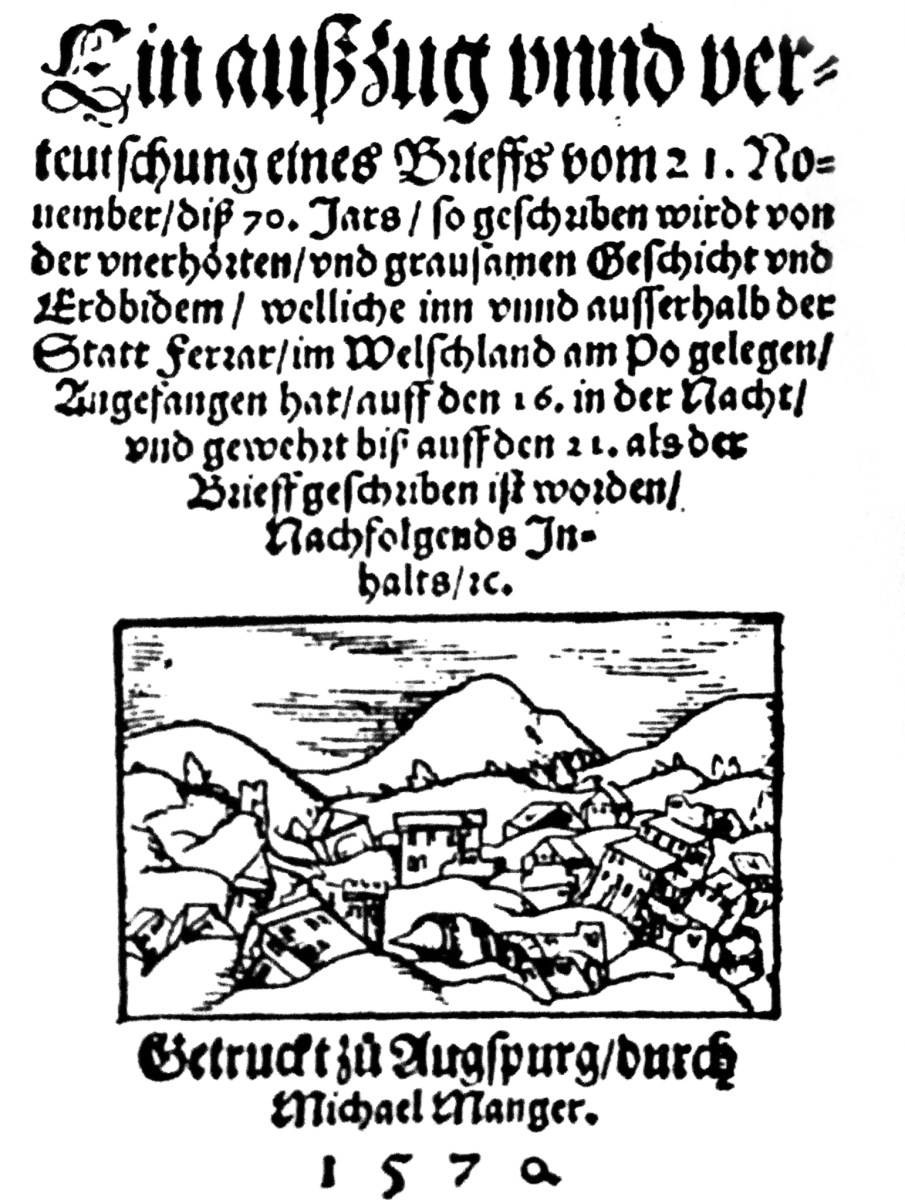
Book by Michael Manger (1570)

=== Precursor events and main shock ===
Earthquake lights were seen above the city on November 15, 1570, the night before the first quake. Flames were reported to come out from the soil and raise into the air, probably small pockets of natural gas set free by cracks in the earth crust. The earthquake struck at dawn: three strong shocks hit the city in the first day; one – the strongest – the day after. The first strong shock struck at 9.30 (local time) November 16, 1570, its epicenter just a few kilometers under the city centre. Six hundred pieces of stone masonry (mostly battlements, balconies and chimneys) are reported to have fallen, further damaging the flimsy stone and hay roofs. The following day the ground trembled again many times. At 8 pm a new powerful shock caused severe damage to walls and caused some buildings to sustain structural damage. Just four hours later, a new tremor caused new cracks and some collapse. At 3 am on November 17 the ground shook harder than ever; many buildings, damaged by the previous shocks, gave way and caved in. Many churches' facades, often built as self-standing walls rising well over the effective architecture, collapsed, including at the Duomo.

Forty percent of the city buildings were damaged, including almost every public building. Some of them collapsed, and many churches sustained critical damage to pillars and main walls. Observers reported that the shallow bowl-shaped valley where Ferrara lies seemed to rise into a kind of hump, before coming back to its original profile. Damage to the city were assessed in over 300,000 scudi, a huge sum at the time. The event was a surprise to many scholars, since according to the then mainstream theory of natural philosophy, earthquakes were not meant to strike in winter or on flat land.

Minor earthquakes had struck Ferrara in the past (events were recorded in 1222, 1504, 1511 and 1561, some of them causing little damage, and a stronger event in 1346). The exceptional length of the seismic swarm, unprecedented at the time in Ferrara, led some to believe it was a supernatural phenomenon.

The earthquake's intensity has been assessed as VIII on the Mercalli intensity scale: only the 1346 event was similar in intensity, though minor urbanization led to less evident damage (but more victims), the other have been all marked as class VII or VI. Other seismic events would hit the city in 1695, 1787 (three shocks in ten days) and 1796.

=== Initial damage evaluation ===
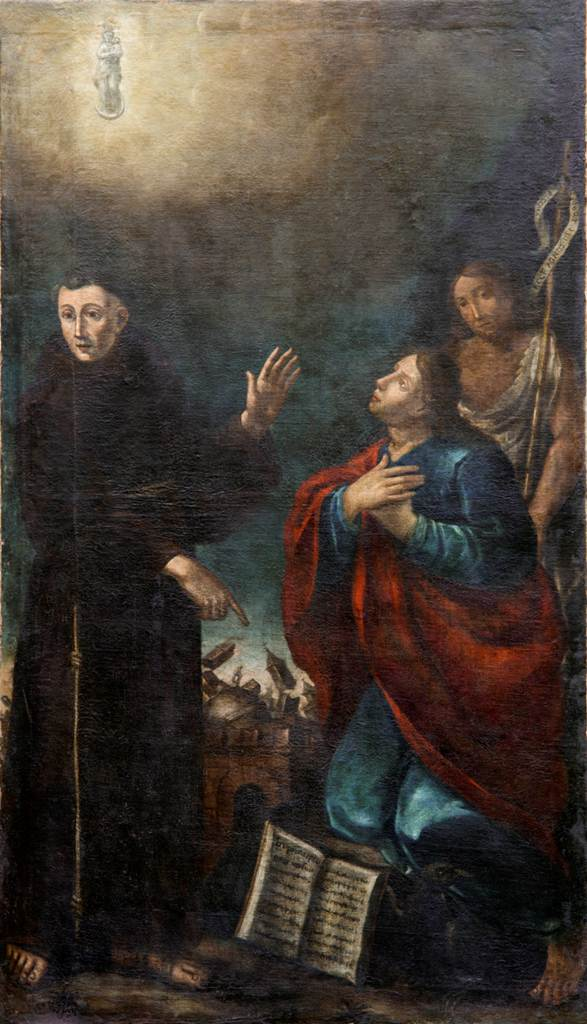
Giovanni Battista Tinti, St. Francis Solanus shows 1570 earthquake to St. John the Apostle and St. John the Baptist (Municipal pinacotheca of Cento)

==== Palaces and public buildings ====
Castello Estense, seat of the Duke, received major damage and became unfit for use. The Palazzo della Ragione (town hall) partially collapsed, as did the enclosure walls of both Loggia dei Banchieri and Loggia dei Callegari, in front of the Dome. Palazzo Vescovile (the Bishop's Palace) was destroyed, and had to be rebuilt. Minor damage was inflicted on the Cardinal Palace, Palazzo del Paradiso, Palazzo Tassoni and Duke Alfonso's personal palace.

==== Churches ====
Damage to churches was widespread. San Paolo and S. Giovanni Battista churches collapsed, many paintings with them. Facades of S.Francesco, S.Andrea, Santa Maria in Vado, S.Domenico, and Santa Maria della Consolazione churches were severely damaged or destroyed, as was the Charterhouse's. The Santa Maria degli Angeli church, still under constructions, was so severely damaged that further work was abandoned. Other than the facade, the Duomo lost the Corpus Domini chapel and part of a side wing: the heavy iron chain above the main altar fell to the ground, along with the columns' fine marble capitals. San Paolo church had to be rebuilt from scratch.

==== Towers ====
Many towers, a common kind of architecture in the Italian city skyline in the renaissance, were damaged. The Castle's bell tower collapsed to the ground, as did the top portion of the other three major towers of the town: Palazzo della Ragione's, the Porta S. Pietro donjon and Castel Tealdo tower. The Steeples of the Duomo, of S.Silvestro, S.Agostino, S.Giorgio and S.Bartolo churches were severely damaged.

=== Further shocks ===
The seismic wave kept going for four years, but the worst was over after about six months.

Just one month after the earthquake, on December 15, 1570, a new powerful shock hit the city: this time the battered Palazzo Tassoni, S.Andrea church and S.Agostino church were not spared.

On the following January 12, 1571, a new shock damaged Palazzo Montecuccoli.

=== Victims ===
Despite the widespread damage, fatalities were quite limited. The initial shocks alerted the population, and gave them time to evacuate the damaged buildings. The majority of houses were of one or two story height, and received less severe damage than the grander palaces and churches.

Reliable sources, such as historian Cesare Nubilonio, estimate 40 victims, while Azariah dei Rossi and Giovanni Battista Guarini both place the estimate at 70. Other sources vary from 9 dead to over 100, with some other occurrences of estimates of the order of two hundred or five hundred, usually taken as unreliable. Florence's ambassador Canigiani is known to have written home about 130 to 150 victims.

== City evacuation ==
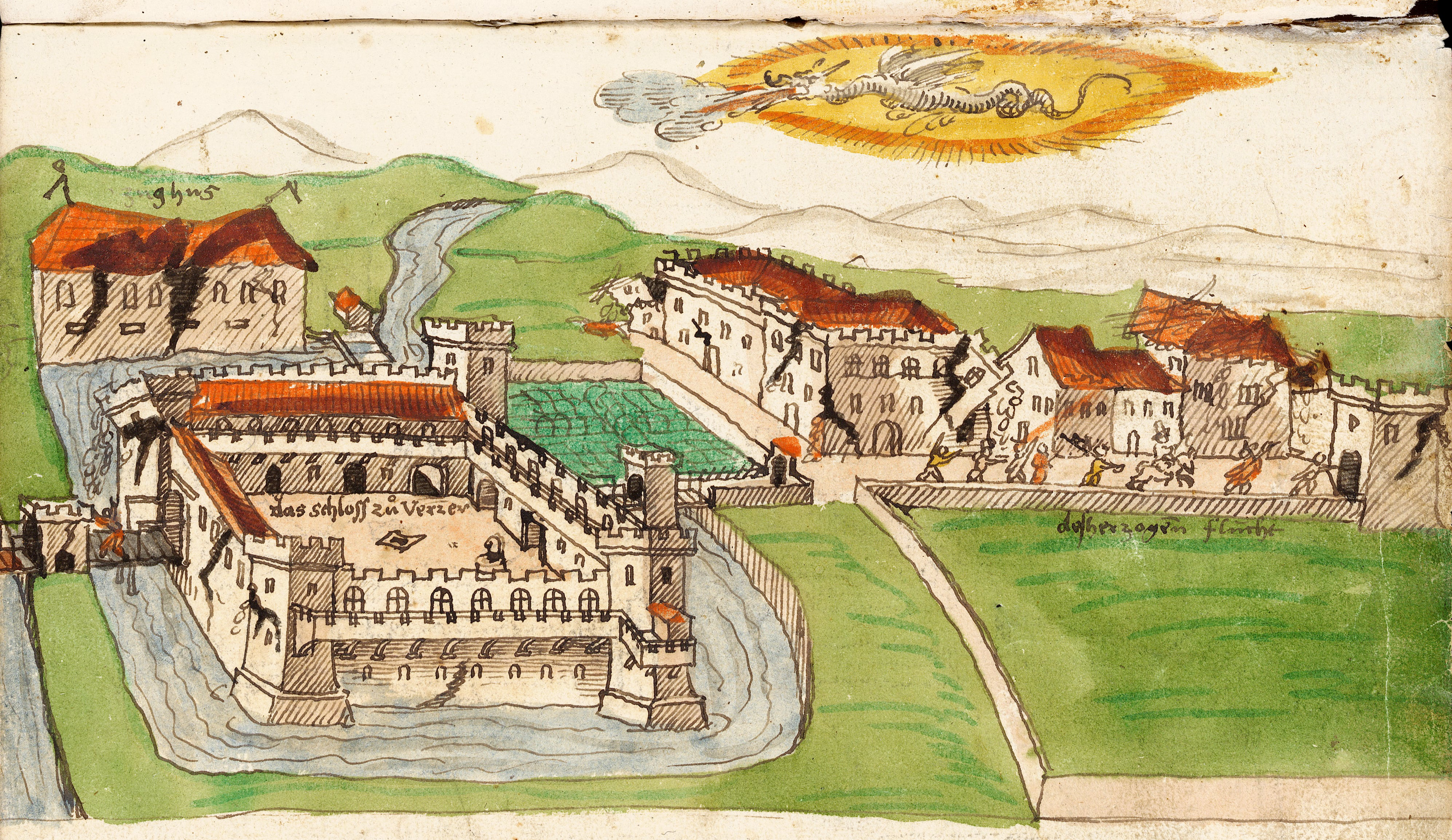
Ferrara destroyed by 1570 earthquake, by H. J. Helden

=== The poor and the wealthy ===
People were scared by the disaster and about a third of the populace left the city for good. City jails collapsed and prisoners escaped the rubble, leading to a crime spree in the city and countryside.

The palaces of the notables and courtesans were damaged as well as the poorest mansions, and the whole city population had to seek shelter together in tents and refuges, despite their status or wealth. Contemporary account estimate eleven thousand people left the city.

The townspeople remained refugees for the following two years, due to the aftershocks. The resulting situation, in which societal rules were upset or fell in disuse, was perceived as awkward and unnatural by both peasants and well-to-do, leading to common psychological issues amongst the population. Along with the fear of aftershocks, people developed a sense of impending doom, precariousness and a general mistrust in humanity.

=== The country court ===
Duke Alfonso II d'Este and his family barely escaped the collapse of a tower of Castello Estense. The lord fled the city by coach, and set up a temporary court in the fields of the San Benedetto garden near the city along with his closest advisor. This unusual improvisation was not well regarded by the Pope and was seen as demeaning by other rulers, but ultimately it proved to be a wise choice and a necessity in view of the duration of the aftershocks.

Ferrara's fate appeared sealed to the ambassadors visiting the refugee Duke: in correspondence between the embassies and the nobles, the region is sometimes called "di Val di Po dov'era Ferrara" (Po Valley, where Ferrara once stood). Florence's ambassadors were especially skeptical about the chances of city recovery.

== Political struggle about the rebuilding ==
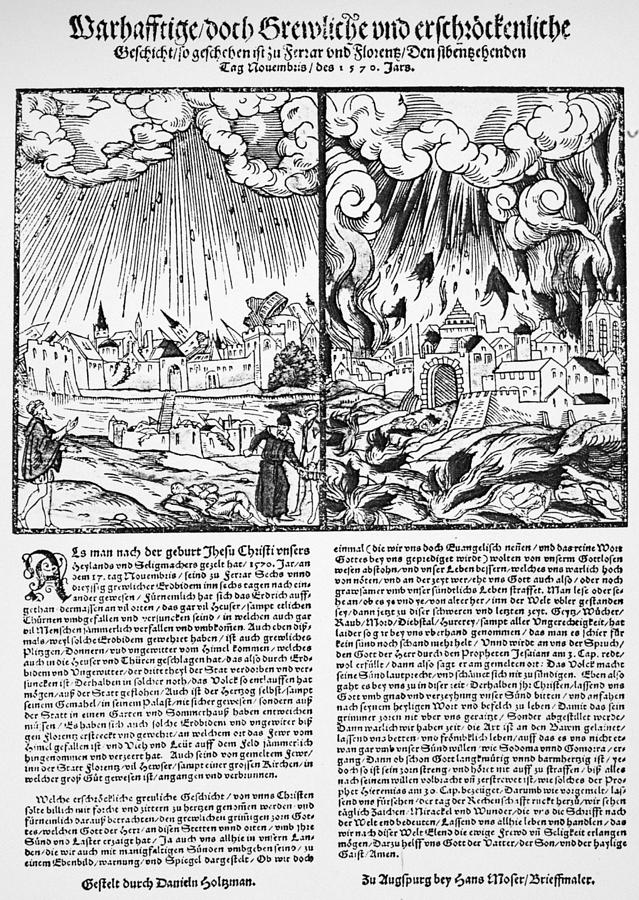
Announcement in a 1570 German woodcut broadside of Ferrara earthquake and Florence burning

=== The Pope's stance ===
The Duke asked Pope Pius V for help, or at least a public blessing to the city: he receiving nothing but a firm reprimand for not having prosecuted enough the city's Jews, well deserving God's wrath toward the city. Alfonso II's answer was prompt, pointing out the evident natural cause of the disaster and discharging any allegation about blaming the Jews.

The Pope's rebuttal was a blunt political maneuver, meant to undermine Alfonso's authority by exploiting the discontented minorities: it stated that since the city administration tolerated the presence of the assassins of Jesus Christ, then God was justifiably angry toward the whole city. Full blame was to be put on Alfonso's part, not on the Jews, for failing to expel them from the city walls.

Jewish city scholar Azariah dei Rossi wrote a short essay on the earthquake in the following days, named Kol Elohim: in the account, he credited the earthquake to a visit from God himself, suggesting it was a supernatural event but not implying any punishment toward the city or its Jews.

=== Scaring the population ===
Along with the Pope's stern letter, emissaries from the Capuchins were sent to the town from Bologna, in order to scare the populace and turn it against Alfonso. The friars took some decomposing corpses from the rubble, and brought them in procession claiming that God was going to sink the city to hell if the people refused to drive Alfonso away.

The macabre show further contributed to the widespread sense of doom and distrust: people living in one of the most free and culturally lively cities of Italy suddenly was cast into a gloomy atmosphere of superstition and religious obscurantism.

=== The Duke's reaction ===
Bothered by the Capuchins' show, annoyed by the Pope's political maneuvers and worried about the loss of hope of the citizens, the Duke decided to display his strength by forcibly expelling the rabble-rousing friars from the city, abandoning any expectation of papal help and unilaterally taking in his hands the control of the city rebuilding.

He walked in procession through the debris, followed by his most trustworthy men, to show off to the populace his control on the city, its laws and its people.

The Duke made every effort to have the Castello Estense repaired in record time, to downplay his hardnesses with the other Italian rulers and to begin to restore a sense of normality in the evacuees. Relationships with the Papacy remained strained, but Alfonso always managed to keep the Pope's demands and attacks at bay.

=== Return into the city and rebuilding efforts ===
After Castello Estense was made safe again, thanks to many iron rods and anchors, in March 1571 the Duke triumphantly relocated back to the city and the return to normality begun to look possible. Minor shocks kept coming, but the city was ready for rebuilding.

Immediately Duke Alfonso ordered a census of the remaining population, and on August 14, 1571, issued a decree ordering the Ferraresi to come back to the city. Return was mandatory for people living in the city for at least 15 years (that is, people with full citizenship rights), under penalty of seizing of their estates. Despite the order, only about two out of three came back to the city: among the people who left the city were many of the wealthiest and a good portion of the court nobles – further diminishing the prestige of Alfonso II.

At first rebuilding works begun on the Duomo and on S.Michele, S.Romano and Santa Maria in Vado churches, overseen by Cardinal Maremonti. According to Guarini, works on S.Rocco, S.Silvestro, S.Stefano, S.Cristoforo, S.Francesco and the rebuilding of S.Paolo begun shortly after, the latter being completed in 1575.

Damage to buildings was so widespread – chronicles reports that all the public building and most of the houses needed work – that the forging of the much needed iron bars caused a shortage of metal in the whole province, depleting stockpiles and requiring massive imports from nearby cities.

== The earthquake observatory ==
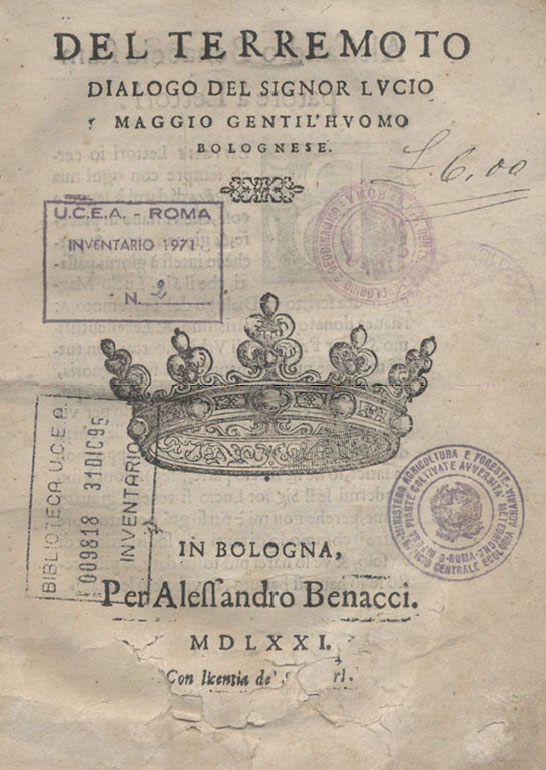
Del terremoto, dialogo del signor Lucio Maggio gentil'huomo bolognese (1571)

=== Founding of the observatory ===
Alfonso called on his court scholars in physics, philosophers and many "experts in various accidents" to inquire into the causes of the disaster, appointing as their leader the renowned Neapolitan architect Pirro Ligorio (a successor of Michelangelo as head of the San Pietro in Vaticano workshop), effectively founding the first seismological observatory and think tank on earthquakes in the world.

The study group wrote six treatises in the following year: four of them were published and quickly became regarded as masterpieces among that part of natural philosophy dedicated to the study of earthquakes, their reputation lasting through the following two centuries. The essays were essential in disproving emerging theories that blamed the earthquake on the drainage of the many Duchy's swamps and their reclamation as fertile agricultural lands. One of the leading theories at the time was that earthquakes were caused by subterranean winds, excited by change in temperature. The winds should have escaped through the marshes, but drainage compromised the process so the winds grew in pressure and caused shocks.

=== Ligorio's work on building safety ===
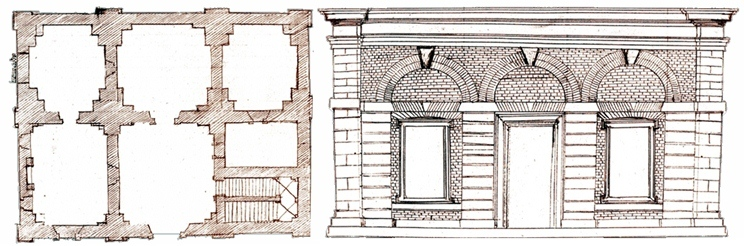
Project for earthquake-resistant structures by Pirro Ligorio

Pirro Ligorio was a scientist and a devout catholic: he needed to carefully weigh his words to avoid a clash with the Curia while at the same time proving that the Pope's claims were unfounded. He collected a long list of earthquakes of the past, compiling a time-line and showing how they were a common and natural occurrence in many parts of the known world. He kept a diary of the aftershock, writing in abundance of detail about their intensity and the damage they kept doing to the city, dramatically improving knowledge of shocks dynamics and consequences of an earthquake.

Ultimately, Ligorio put the blame for the extensive damage on inappropriate techniques and bad materials used in building the city's edifices. The random mixing of stones, brick and sand in the main walls was strongly criticized, along with the rooftops built to push horizontally on the side walls (instead of providing a vertical load). Approximation in leveling of walls and ceilings led to uneven discharge of forces.

In the last part of his treatise, Rimedi contra terremoti per la sicurezza degli edifici (Remedies against earthquakes for building security), Ligorio presented design plans for a shock-proof building, the first known design with a scientific anti-seismic approach. Many of the empirical findings of Ligorio are consistent with contemporary anti-seismic practices: among them the correct dimensioning of main walls, use of better and stronger bricks as well as elastic structural joints and iron rods.

== Following years ==
=== Loss of independence ===
Late in 1571, Alfonso II was called to fight against the Ottoman Empire fleet in the Battle of Lepanto. While the Duke was away, the Pope executed a thorough purge of the Jews from the Papal States, including Ferrara. The only allowed ghettoes were established in Rome and Ancona. Pope Pius V died the following year.

After the earthquake, many nobles and well-off merchants left the city, managing their business in their country villas or moving their houses to nearby towns. Ferrara lost its capital city status and was demoted to a simple border city squeezed between Venice and the Papal States, never fully achieving economic recovery from the disaster. Without the Jews' businesses, crushed by costly reconstruction debts and losing its thriving cultural circle, the city became a minor trade and agricultural hub up until the 19th century.

In 1598, Alfonso died without legitimate heirs, and the city was formally annexed to the Papal States by means of questionable claims of vacancy. The annexation of Ferrara and Comacchio was disputed by many contemporaries, including the weak Duke of Modena Cesare d'Este who was the direct candidate to the succession, but was ultimately completed.

=== Permanent damage ===
The city's architecture still bears many marks from the earthquake. Iron braces and rods placed in the aftermath of the shocks to strengthen the damaged walls are still present, windows closed with stones and concrete to improve the stability of damaged facades are a common occurrence and there are traces of the stubs once sustaining collapsed balconies and porches. Chimneys, decorated battlements and terraces were damaged or destroyed, and were rebuilt in the following decade in a changed style and materials.

Walls from historical buildings are often uneven and out of angle. This is sometimes said by locals to provoke the special Ferrara feeling to visitors, a veiled sense of dizziness and disorientation.

== See also ==
- List of earthquakes in Italy
- List of historical earthquakes
