= Sangiuliano (disambiguation) =

Sangiuliano may refer to:

- Francesco Pucci di Sangiuliano (XIX^{e} century-1880), Italian politician
- Gennaro Sangiuliano (born 1962), Italian journalist and minister
- Rachele Sangiuliano (born 1981), Italian volleyball player

== See also ==
- San Giuliano
