= San Giuliano =

San Giuliano (Italian for 'Saint Julian') may refer to:

== Places ==
- Lake San Giuliano, Basilicata, Italy
- Monte San Giuliano, old name of Erice, Sicily, Italy
- Necropolis of San Giuliano, Barbarano Romano, Lazio, Italy
- San-Giuliano, municipality in Corsica, France
- San Giuliano, a borough of Alessandria, Piedmont, Italy
- San Giuliano, a borough of Castelvetro Piacentino, Emilia-Romagna, Italy
- San Giuliano, a borough of L'Aquila, Abruzzo, Italy
- San Giuliano, a borough of Prignano Cilento, Campania, Italy
- San Giuliano, a borough of Susa, Piedmont, Italy
- San Giuliano, a borough of Teano, Campania, Italy
- San Giuliano del Sannio, municipality in Molise, Italy
- San Giuliano di Puglia, municipality in Molise, Italy
- San Giuliano Milanese, municipality in Lombardy, Italy
- San Giuliano Terme, municipality in Tuscany, Italy

== Churches and buildings ==
- Church of San Giuliano, Bologna, Emilia-Romagna, Italy
- Church of San Giuliano, Catania, Sicily, Italy
- Church of San Giuliano, Erice, Sicily, Italy
- Church of San Giuliano, Ferrara, Emilia-Romagna, Italy
- Church of San Giuliano, Rimini, Emilia-Romagna, Italy
- Church of San Giuliano Martire, Rome, Lazio, Italy
- Palazzo San Giuliano, Catania, Sicily, Italy
- Torre di San Giuliano or Saint Julian's Tower, Sliema, Malta

== People ==
- Antonino Paternò Castello, Marchese di San Giuliano (1852–1914), Italian politician

== See also ==
- Sangiuliano
