= Francesco Ferrari (painter) =

Italian painter

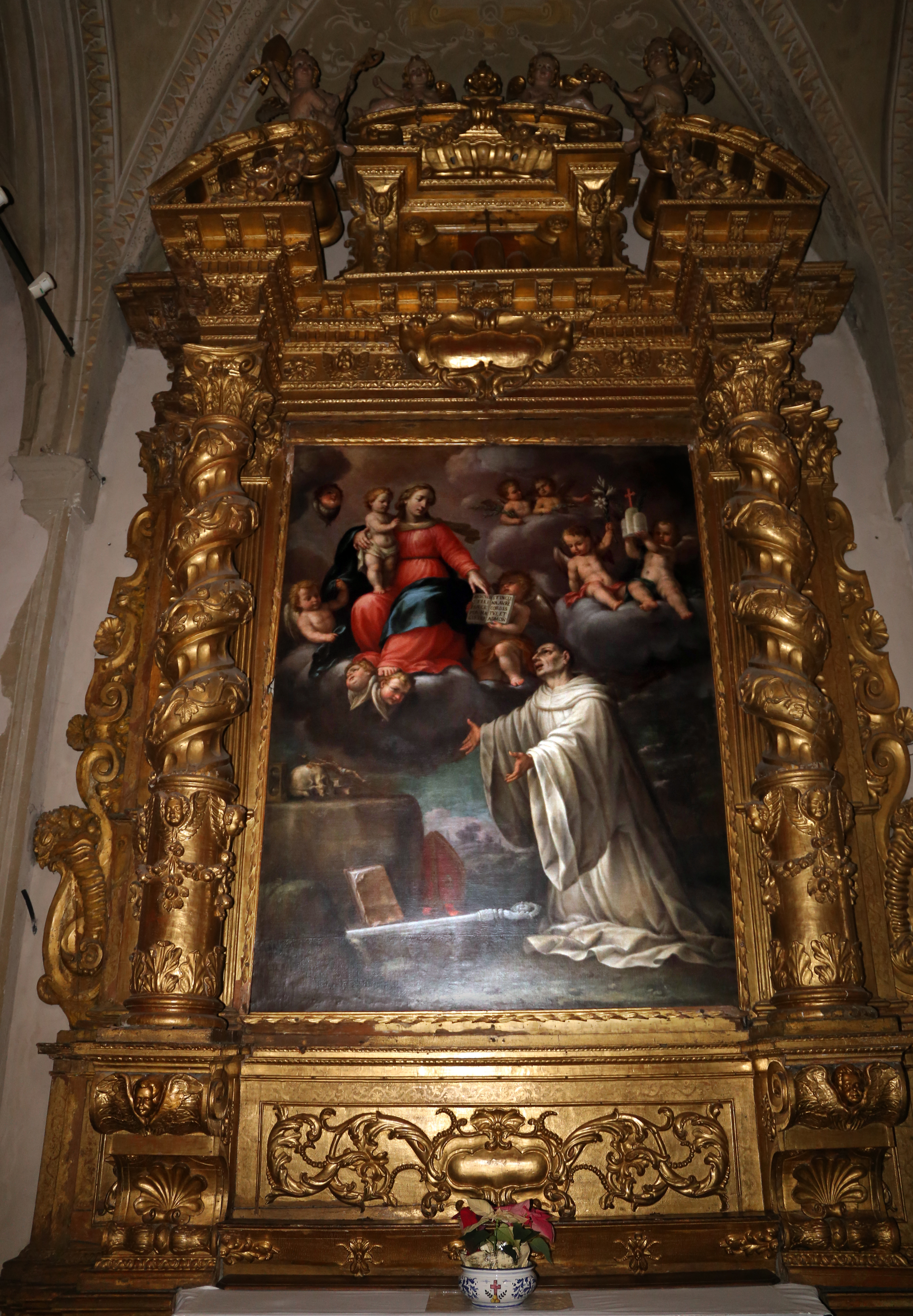
Vision of blessed Bernardo Tolomei, San Giorgio, Ferrara

Francesco Ferrari (1634–1708) was an Italian painter and architect of the Baroque period, active in Ferrara and across Northern Italy and Vienna.

== Biography ==
Born near Rovigo, and moved into Ferrara. He had been instructed in figure painting by a Frenchman, and afterwards became professor of architectural and ornamental painting under the Bolognese painter Gabriel Rossi. Ferrari painted The Dispute of St Cirillo and the Prayer of Elias elicits Rain for the church of San Paolo, Ferrara. He also painted for the Carmine and at San Giorgio. He worked also for theaters and in different Italian cities as an architect, including in the service of Leopold I at Vienna. Being constrained to leave Germany on account of his health, he returned to Ferrara.

Among his pupils were Mornassi, Grassaleoni, Paggi, Raffanelli, Giacomo Filippi, and one who surpassed all the rest, Antonfelice Ferrari, his son.
