= Pirro Ligorio =

Italian architect and painter (1512–1583)

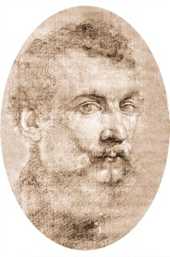
- Pirro Ligorio
- Born: c. 1512; Naples, Italy
- Died: 30 October 1583 (aged about 70); Ferrara, Italy
- Known for: Architecture, painting, garden design, antiques
- Notable work: Villa d'Este, Casina Pio IV
- Movement: High Renaissance

Pirro Ligorio (c. 1512 – October 30, 1583) was an Italian architect, painter, antiquarian, and garden designer during the Renaissance period. He worked as the Vatican's Papal Architect under Popes Paul IV and Pius IV, designed the fountains at Villa d’Este at Tivoli for Cardinal Ippolito II d’Este, and served as the Ducal Antiquary in Ferrara. Ligorio emphasized and showed a deep passion for classical Roman antiquity.

== Early life and career ==
Due to lack of accurate documentation, very little is known about the first three decades of Ligorio's life. It is estimated that he was born in Naples, Italy, in 1512 or 1513 while the city was still under Spanish rule. His parents, Achille and Gismunda Ligorio, were rumored to be members of the noble class in Seggio di Portanova, a section of Naples. Around age twenty, Pirro Ligorio left the tumultuous and poverty-stricken city of Naples to pursue a more flourishing livelihood in Rome. The city was home to a thriving art community, especially under the patronage of the Vatican.

For his first job in Rome, Ligorio painted and decorated the façades of homes and palaces. This role had previously been filled by Polidoro da Caravaggio, who fled in 1527, allowing Ligorio to enter the field with very little formal artistic training. His first documented contract was signed on 12 May 1542 when Ligorio decorated the loggia on the palace of the archbishop of Benevento. He was chosen specifically for his knowledge of the grotesque style, which was popularized by Raphael and his followers in the sixteenth century. Ligorio greatly appreciated this style, and incorporated its elements (friezes, scenes from Roman history, trophies, etc.) into his work often.

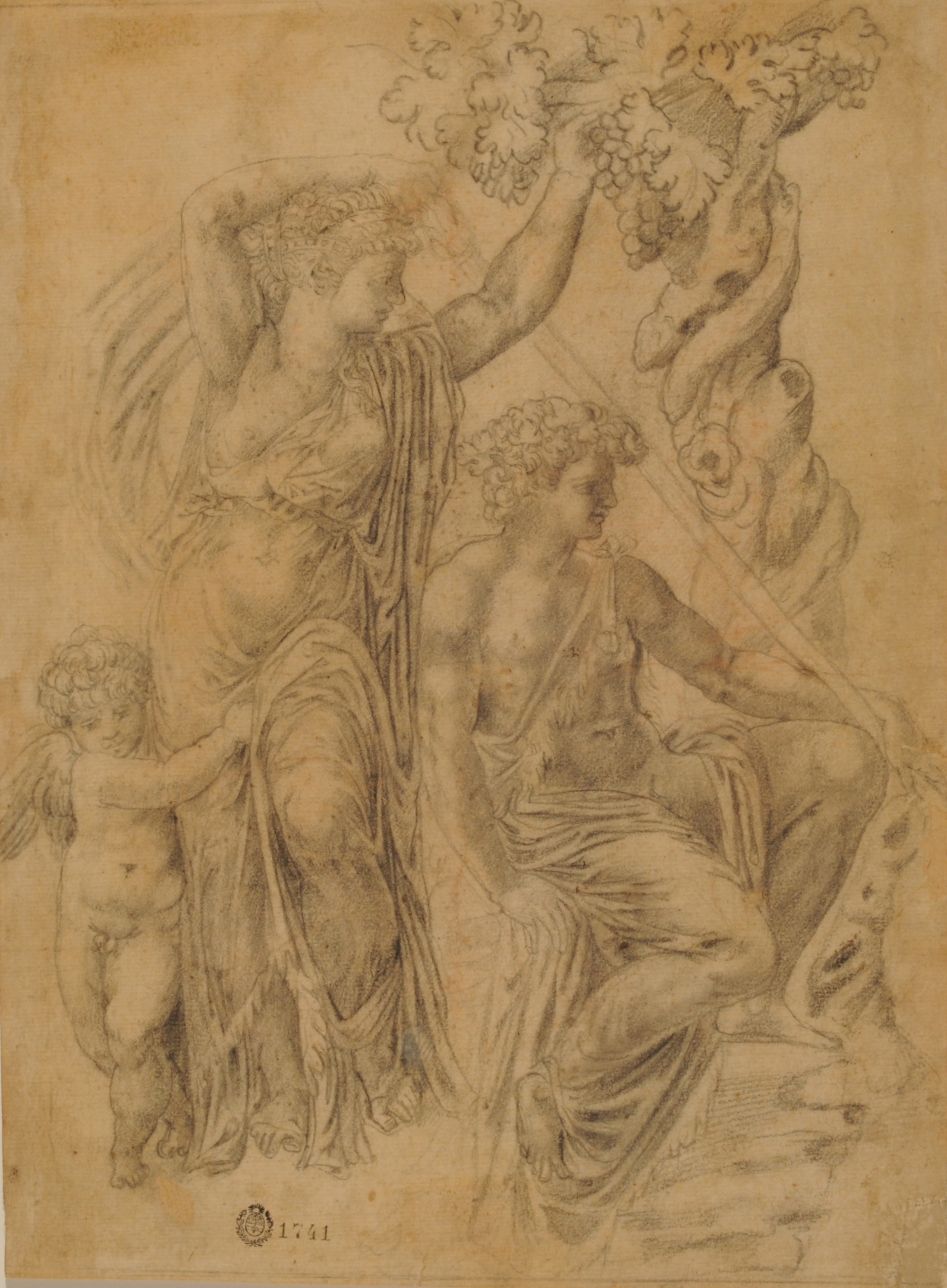
Drawing of Two Figures and Cupid

Many of the paintings from his early career, unfortunately, were destroyed or repainted less than a century later. However, several surviving drawings from that time period have been recovered and attributed to Ligorio. This identification was often made based on the subject matter; many of the drawings featured façade paintings, Roman characters, and antique Renaissance objects. These loose connections allowed historians to name Ligorio as the rightful artist of these drawings, which are now held in collections across the world (including one at the Art Institute of Chicago).

In the mid sixteenth century, Ligorio was commissioned to assist in the decoration of the Oratory of San Giovanni Decollato in Rome. In particular, he painted a fresco of The Dance of Salome. Exact dates are unclear, but it is estimated he painted the fresco between 1544 and 1553. Early drawing drafts and the fresco itself shows Ligorio's commitment to the Raphaelesque and Manneristic styles. Notably, this is one of the few surviving large works of his early career.

Around the same time, Ligorio began to explore the subject of classical antiquity. He spent a large portion of the 1540s learning as much as possible about Roman antiques, and preserved valuable information while the pope destroyed artifacts in excavation projects. In the following decade, Ligorio worked to publish this knowledge. He published one book, Delle antichità di Roma, in 1553, and engraved several antiques. He also attempted to write an encyclopedia of Roman and Greek antiquity at least twice, some parts of which can now be found in the Biblioteca Nazionale in Naples. Despite its important contributions to the Italian knowledge base of Roman antiquities, Ligorio's writings were met with some criticism; in particular, he was charged with widespread forgery. However, no substantial evidence of forgery has been identified.

Finally, Ligorio's period of archeological exploration and writing was accompanied by another pursuit: cartography. Between 1557 and 1563, Ligorio combined his antiquarian knowledge and drawing abilities to create several maps of Rome. Most notably, in 1561 he published his “Antiquae urbis imago” (Image of Ancient Rome), a topographical map of ancient Rome. This was considered the pinnacle of his cartographical endeavors.

== Career at the Vatican ==
=== Pope Paul IV (1555–1559) ===
When Paul IV became Pope, he was interested in hiring a fellow Neapolitan as the Vatican Architect. Three years into his papacy, in 1558, he hired Ligorio as the Architetto Fabricae Palatinae, meaning Architect of the Vatican Palace. His assistant was Sallustio Peruzzi.

His first and most prominent work was on the chapel in the newly built Papal apartment. Construction of the residential areas had been prioritized, allowing Paul to move in by October 1556. The chapel, however, remained unfinished and was tasked to Ligorio. He designed two large angel paintings for the space, and finished the project in about ten months. Around the same time, he received the commission to create a casino for the pope near Belvedere Court. This project was stalled due to financial concerns, but would later become one of Ligorio's cornerstone projects under the patronage of Pope Pius IV.

Paul IV also pursued major renovations to the papal palace in this time period. In particular, Paul aimed to increase the flow of light in the Hall of Constantine. Ligorio, as his most trusted architect, was chosen to remedy the darkness problem. They chose to destroy the old papal apartment and incorporate a rooftop garden into the space, allowing more light to enter the Hall of Constantine.

Towards the end of Paul IV's tenure, he asked Ligorio to design a monstrance, or tabernacle, to be used for special papal trips. It was to be stored in the newly designed chapel. Unfortunately, Paul died while the project was still in its early stages. The following pope, however, greatly valued continuation of unfinished projects, and ordered that Ligorio finish the monstrance. Upon completion, it was sent to Milan as a gift to the Duomo.

=== Pope Pius IV (1559–1565) ===
Pius IV rose to the papacy in 1559, already holding a reputation as a strong patron of the arts—architecture especially. In fact, within the first three years of his pontificate, he spent a million and a half gold scudi on building projects. His approach was unique in that he prioritized finishing incomplete projects, rather than starting new ones. This aligned well with Ligorio's values, specifically his desire to restore fragmented artifacts and preserve classical antiquities.

Under Pius IV, Ligorio was once again paired with his assistant, Sallustio Peruzzi. Their first major project was remodeling the Vatican Library in 1560. Some records suggest plans to create an entirely new library, but due to lack of funding, these updates likely involved smaller-scale woodworking and masonry by Ligorio. He was also tasked with smaller projects in this time, such as masonry work and apartment building throughout the palace.

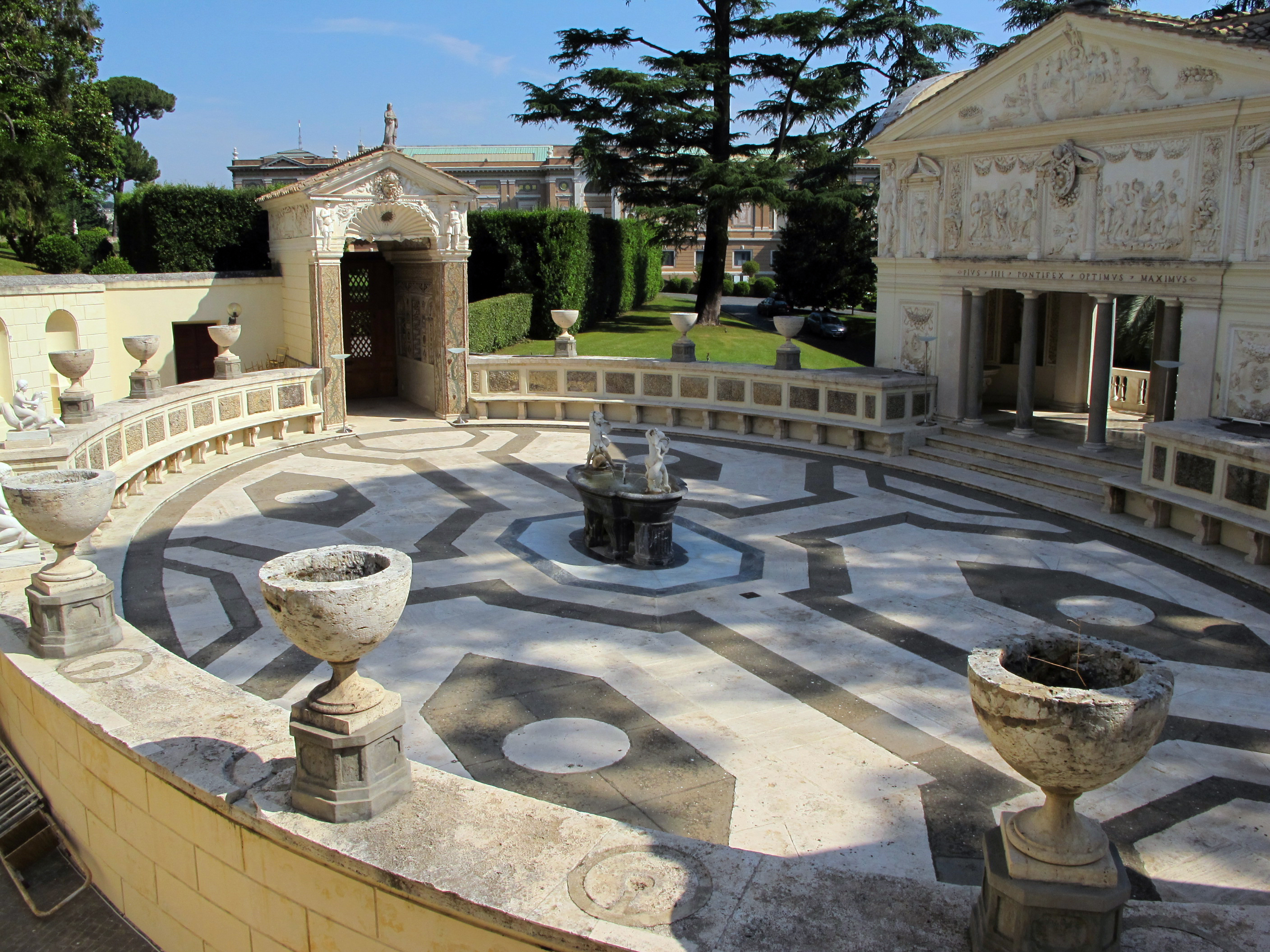
The oval-shaped piazza at the Casino of Pius IV

In May 1560, Ligorio received a commission of great significance: the continuation of Paul's plans for the papal casino. Located in the woods behind the Belvedere court, Pius' revamped plans for the space included a second story, large fountain, and oval courtyard with arched entryways. The decorations matched Ligorio's preferred Raphaelesqu style. It was named the Casino of Pius IV in honor of the pope who supported its construction. Swiss historian Jacob Burckhardt called it "the most beautiful afternoon retreat that modern architecture has created."

On 2 December 1560, Ligorio was awarded with honorary Roman citizenship for his contributions to the culture and architecture of the city. This was a major honor, awarded to only three other people during the sixteenth century: Michaelangelo, Titian, and Fra Guglielmo della Porta. For the remainder of his life, Ligorio identified as both a Neapolitan citizen by birth and a Roman citizen. This recognition also increased the commissions and projects for which Ligorio was pursued, and made the papacy of Pius IV one of Ligorio's busiest times.

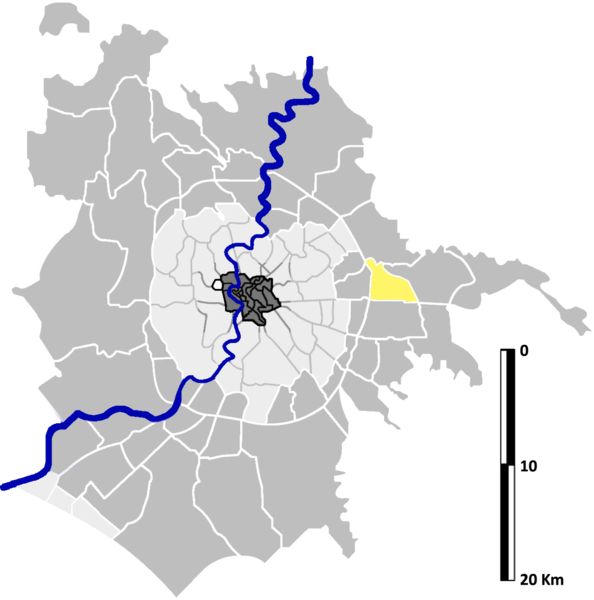
Map of the Acqua Vergine

This period also marked one of Ligorio's most prominent ventures into engineering. Papal duties included protecting the cities in its territory, which involved repairing fortifications in those cities. The duties of a Renaissance architect included consideration of engineering concerns, so Ligorio engaged in these renovations during his time as the Architect of the Vatican. He is particularly remembered for his role in the restoration of the Acqua Vergine, an ancient Roman aqueduct. Its malfunction was forcing Roman citizens to use the unsanitary water of the Tiber River. Ligorio demanded its reconstruction, which began in April 1561 and took approximately five years to complete.

In the early 1560s, the pope turned his attention toward the completion of several projects in the Belvedere Court. Ligorio in particular focused on the Nicchione built by Bramante in the northern end of the Belvedere Court. He added a semicircular loggia, which ended up being used in many of Rome's festivals as a fireworks site. Ligorio's other contribution to the Belvedere Court was an open-air theater on the southern end, which was completed in May 1565. Unfortunately this theater was torn down in the eighteenth century and replaced by a wall. The Belvedere Court itself was used for a large tournament in March 1565 in honor of the marriage of the pope's nephew. The Nicchione space was designed to be viewed specifically from a window in the pope's apartment, framed like a painting.

Another project requested by Pius IV in 1565 was the organization of Vatican archives. Ligorio was tasked with designing a structure to hold these records. Although little remains of this Archivio today, its architectural design suggests a brief departure from Ligorio's typical style (as exemplified by, for example, the extravagant Casino). Normally his facades were beautifully and intricately decorated in the mannerist tradition. This building, however, was notably utilitarian and modest. Ligorio was staying true to the purpose of the building and Pius' wishes by matching its design to its no-frills function.

After the death of Michelangelo, Ligorio was appointed as the architect of the San Pietro church in May 1564. This greatly annoyed Giorgio Vasari, an admirer of Michelangelo and enemy of Ligorio. The second architect on the project was Giacomo Vignola. Together they accomplished little progress on the church, and were eventually released from their duties under the new pope.

=== Imprisonment ===
Ligorio's employment at the Vatican was briefly interrupted in the summer of 1565 when he was imprisoned for one week. Allegedly, he had committed fraud by stealing building materials during several of his papal architectural projects. He was investigated extensively and had his writings removed. He was released with little incident, aside from having medallions worth six thousand scudi removed from his possession. Accusations like these, however, did not help Ligorio's already controversial fame and earlier allegations of forgery against him.

=== Pope Pius V (1566–1572) ===
Unlike his predecessor, Pius V had little to do with Ligorio; this was mostly due to the two popes' deep-rooted ideological differences. He tasked Ligorio with some minor woodworking and design projects; Ligorio held on to his title of Palace Architect until possibly as late as June 1567. During the final years of his tenure, he actually returned to Ferrara for work.

== Ferrara ==
=== Ippolito II d'Este ===
In September 1550, before his employment at the Vatican and during his study of classical antiquity, Ligorio was hired by the Cardinal of Ferrara (Ippolito II d'Este) to accompany him to Tivoli. There, while the Cardinal served as governor, Ligorio managed his antique collection and served as a top advisor. The area was rich with remains of old villas and temples, allowing Ligorio to further his research of Roman antiques and the governor to add to his own personal collection.

=== Villa d'Este ===
Upon arriving to Tivoli, Ippolito II d'Este decided to turn an old monastery into his own luxury villa. Building would be stalled for the majority of the decade due to changes in Ippolito's duties, but fully resumed in 1560. Giovanni Alberto Galvani served as the main architect, but Pirro Ligorio took charge of the villa's extensive and intricate gardens. These gardens included many waterworks and fountains (utilizing Ligorio's knowledge of aqueduct engineering), as well as a collection of ancient sculpture. Ligorio designed both a larger public garden and a smaller private garden. The latter can be accessed directly from the palace, and utilizes shaded walls to maintain a private retreat.

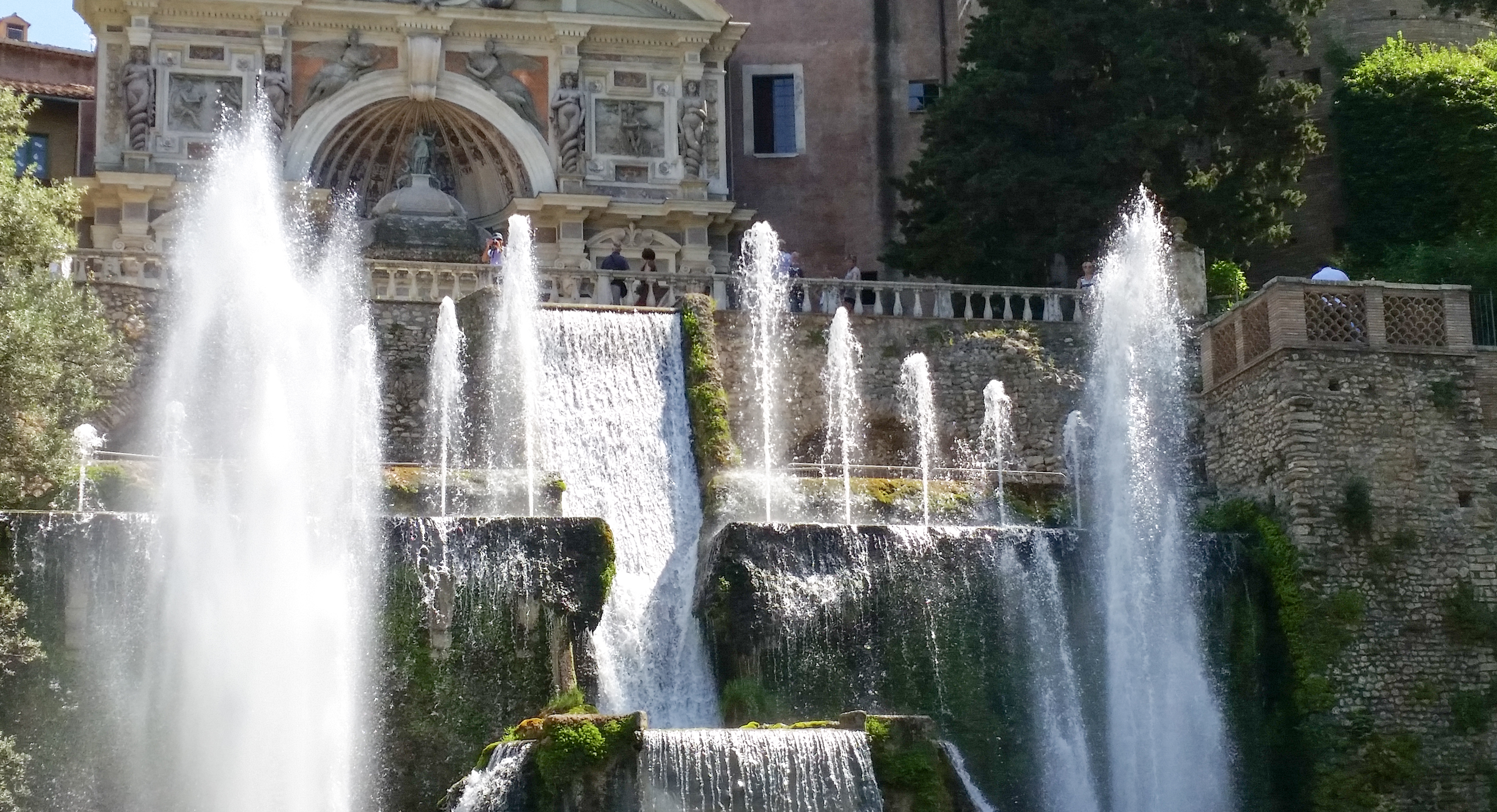
Fountains at the Villa d'Este in Tivoli

As described by David Coffin, Ligorio's most prominent biographer, Ligorio employed three major themes in these gardens. First and foremost was a focus on the relationship between nature and art—a concern indicative of the Renaissance period. Many of Ligorio's waterworks and sculptures incorporated flora and fauna, marrying the natural aspects of the garden with the man-made artistic elements. The second theme was geographic; Ligorio designed the fountains to represent the three rivers flowing into the Fountain of Rome in an ode to the cardinal's appreciation of the arts. Finally, Ligorio's use of mythological iconography, specifically the influence of the Garden of the Hesperides, was executed with special attentiveness. This incorporation of the imagery of Hercules and his struggle with virtue and vice showcases both Ligorio's knowledge of ancient Greek and Roman mythology, but also the cardinal's Christian faith and moral grounding.

=== Alfonso II d'Este ===
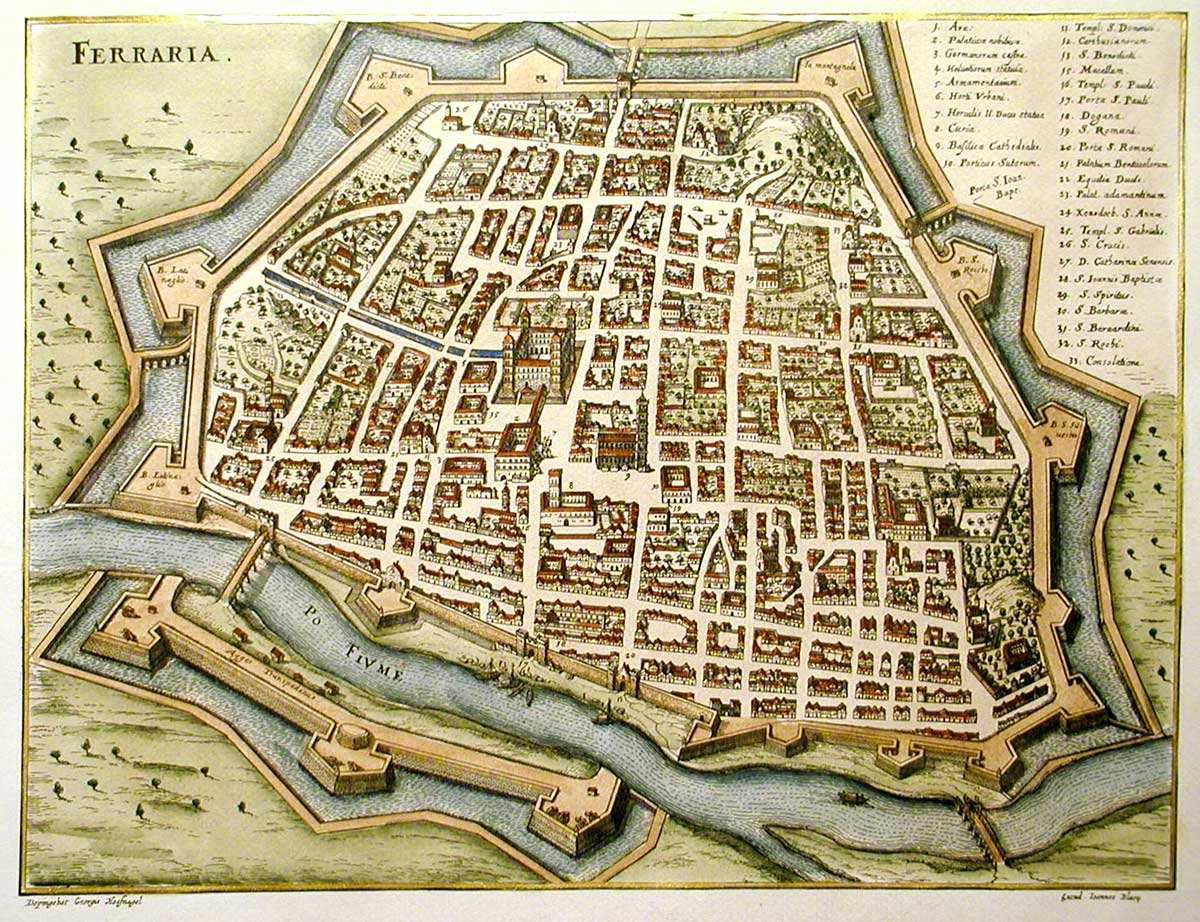
Map of Ferrara, 1600

Much later, at the end of Ligorio's work for the Vatican, he returned to Ferrara yet again—this time in a more purely intellectual role. Beginning in December 1568, he served under Duke Alfonso II d'Este of Ferrara as the Ducal Antiquarian. He also acquired the title of Lector at the University of Ferrara. Ligorio's main duties involved preparing the ducal library and organizing an antique museum for Alfonso's court. He contributed numerous drawings and designs to these records, and continued to foster a reputation of antiquarian knowledge in Ferrara. In 1580, he was named an honorary citizen—adding a third layer to his identity as a Neopolitan and Roman.

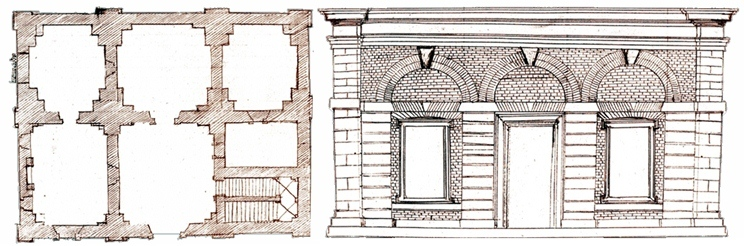
Project for earthquake-resistant structures by Pirro Ligorio

On 16 November 1570, a major earthquake hit the city of Ferrara and inflicted heavy damage on its architecture. This sparked an interest in Ligorio, who decided to write a treatise on historical earthquakes. He detailed the effects of the Ferrara earthquake for several months, then began developing plans for an earthquake-resistant home. Ligorio diverted from the traditional view of earthquakes as supernatural phenomenon, and treated them as a natural occurrence around which man could reason. Many of the elements he incorporated, including thicker brick walls and stone piers, match modern anti-seismic practices. Again, this shows Ligorio's concern for not just the design, but also the engineering and structural integrity of his buildings.

== Legacy ==
Ligorio reportedly died in October 1583 after suffering a particularly rough fall in Ferrara.

Despite his major contributions to Renaissance Italian architecture, classical antiquity, and garden design, Pirro Ligorio maintains surprisingly little presence in accounts of that time period. Giovanni Baglioni published the first biography of Ligorio in 1642, which was later replicated in other biographies by Milizia and Nagler, except with numerous factual errors. This may be due, in part, to the lack of documentation regarding Pirro Ligorio's life. The first thirty years of his life, for example, remain almost entirely a mystery. Additionally, many of Ligorio's designs, drawings, and buildings were destroyed over the years, making documentation of his work even more difficult. In the twentieth century, historian David Coffin wrote his dissertation on the life of Ligorio and quickly became the world's foremost expert on the architect. Coffin's book, Pirro Ligorio: The Renaissance Artist, Architect, and Antiquarian, remains the most valuable and complete account of Ligorio's life and works.

In the Epilogue of his book, Coffin describes Ligorio's personality as having three main traits: curiosity, imagination, and ambition. His curiosity led him to pursue a multitude of projects and interests, including painting, garden design, engineering, gardening, cartography, and archaeology. His imagination can be seen in the groundbreaking marriage of botany, sculpture, waterworks, and mythology found in the gardens at Tivoli. Finally, his ambition: Ligorio pursued his chosen fields with great focus and fervor, gaining admirers as well as detractors along the way. In particular, Ligorio found an enemy in fellow Renaissance architect Giorgio Vasari, who refused to include a biography of Ligorio in his Vite. This had a significant impact on the immortalization of Ligorio's legacy, and left his life much less documented compared to his contemporaries.
