= San Paolo, Ferrara =

Church in Ferrara, Italy

Coordinates: 44.8342°N 11.6176°E

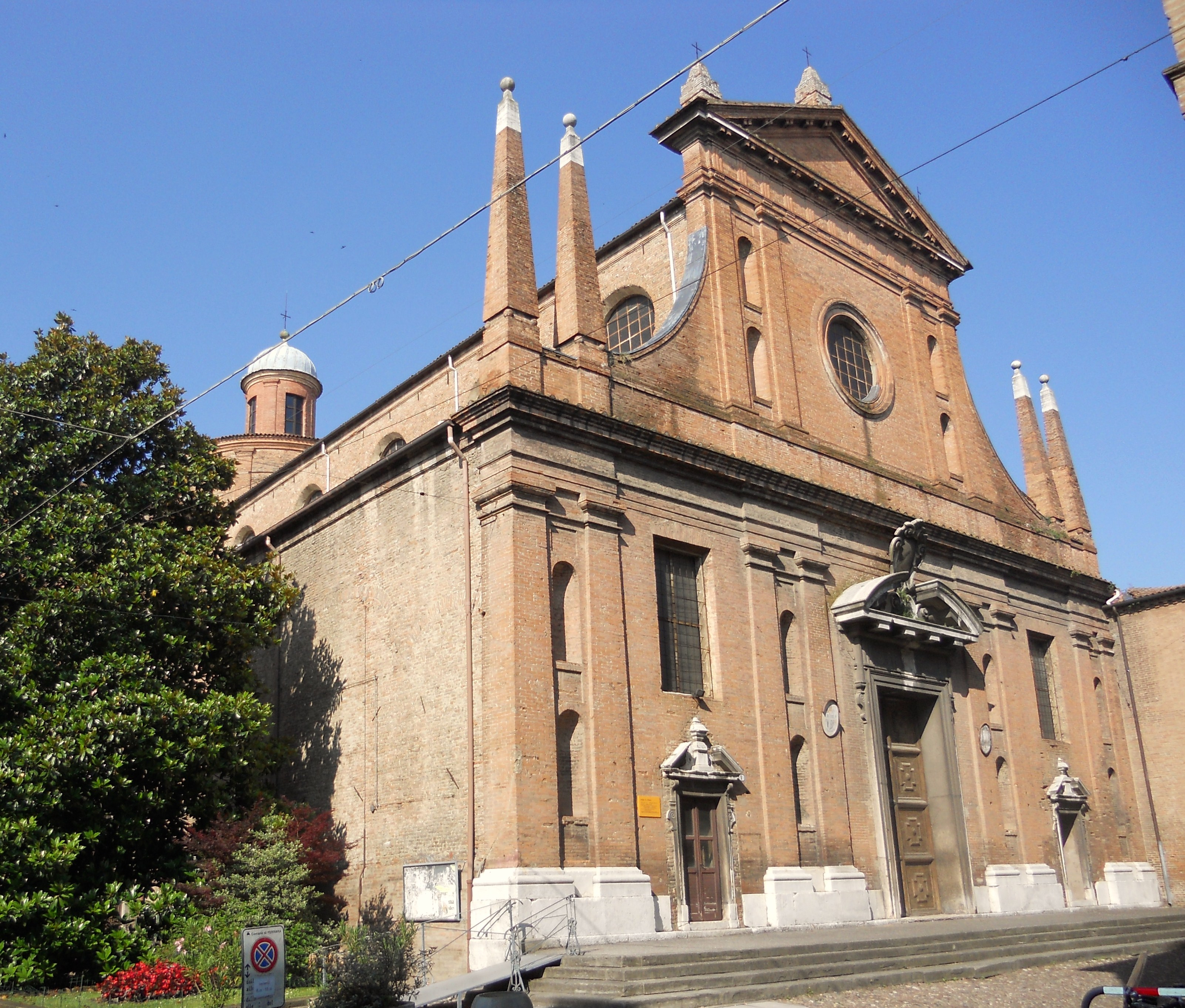
Church of San Paolo in Ferrara

The Church of San Paolo in Ferrara is located on corso Porta Reno 60, a few blocks south of the Ferrara Cathedral, facing piazzetta Alberto Schiatti. It is considered the pantheon for famous citizens of the city.

== History ==
Construction of a parish church at the site was begun in the tenth century. In 1295, the church was affiliated with the Order of the Blessed Virgin of Mount Carmel. Over the next two centuries, a monastery was built adjacent to the church with two cloisters. The monastery was rebuilt after the 15th century in a Renaissance style.

After the earthquake of 1570, reconstruction of the church was entrusted to the architect Alberto Schiatti. Construction began in 1575, and the church was reconsecrated in 1611. The adjacent Carmelitan monastery was enlarged. During the Napoleonic occupation, the monastery was suppressed, and converted into a jail, for which it continued to be used till 1912. The church remained open as a parish church.

The church contains works by important Ferrarese artists such as:

- Left Nave
  - Descent of Holy Spirit by Scarsellino.
  - Resurrection and Circumcision of Jesus by Bastianino.
- Right Nave
  - Birth of St John the Baptist by Scarsellino.
  - Annunciation by Bastianino.
- Right Transept
  - St Jerome (under organ) by Girolamo da Carpi.
- Right of Main Altar
  - Adoration of the Magi by Domenico Mona.
- Presbytery
  - Conversion of St Paul and Beheading of St Paul by Domenico Mona.
- Apse
  - Rapture of Elias, by Scarsellino.
- Frescoes on one wall of the choir date to prior to the 14th century.
