= San Giuliano, Rimini =

Church building in Rimini, Italy

Coordinates: 44.0653°N 12.5628°E

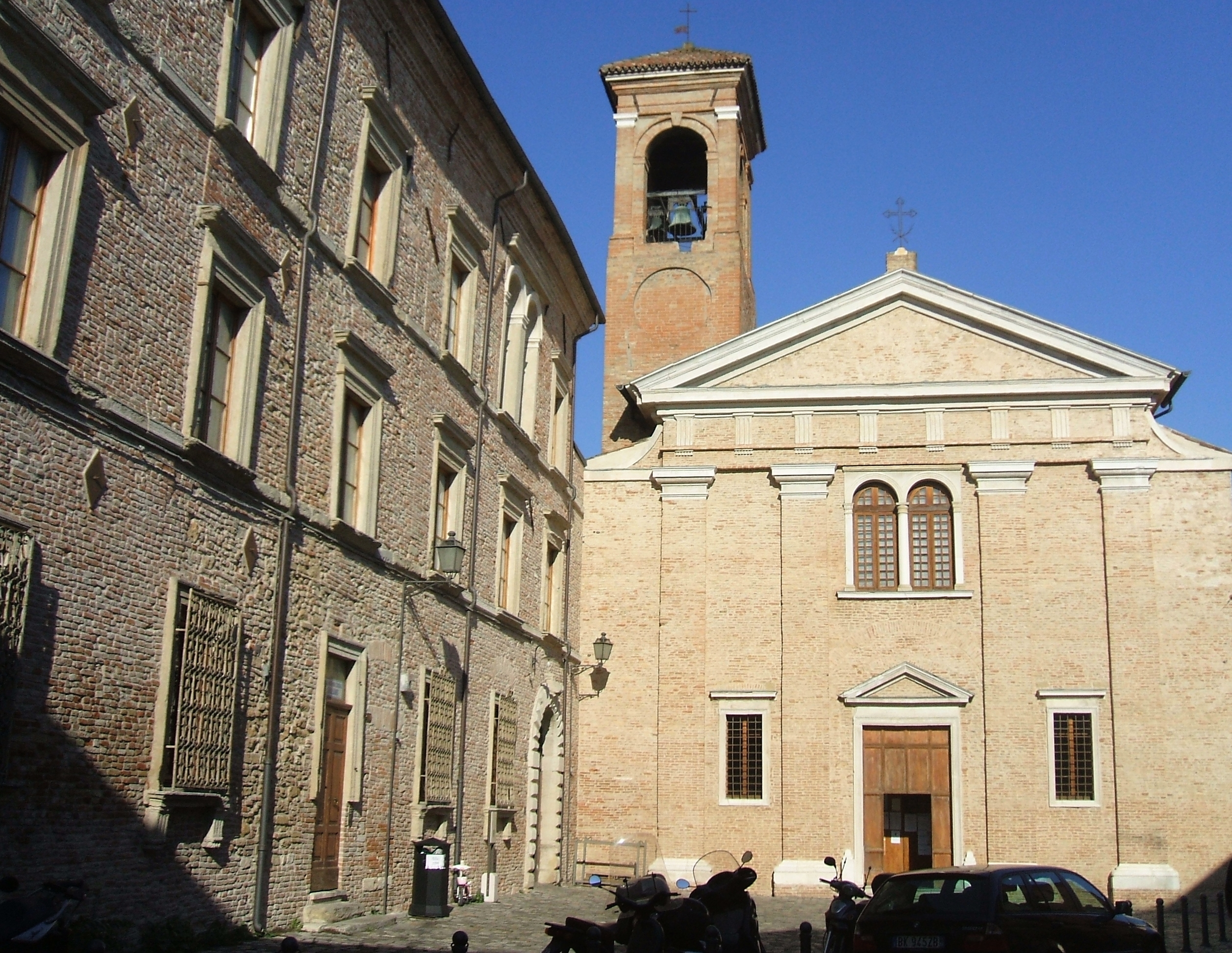

San Giuliano or San Giuliano Martire is a Renaissance-style Roman Catholic church in Rimini, Italy.

The church was built during 1553–1575 adjacent to a Benedictine order abbey. The present structure was built at the site of a 9th-century church dedicated to Santi Apostoli Pietro e Paolo. The Benedictines were suppressed in 1797 by Napoleonic forces.

The church held works by Giuseppe Pedretti and Francesco Mancini. The main altarpiece is a master work by Paolo Veronese depicting the Martyrdom of San Giuliano (1588). The church also houses the polyptych (1409) by Bittino da Faenza (1357–1427) depicting episodes of this saint's life. Relics of the saint were kept in the church.

== Sarcophagus legend ==
According to local legend, during the reign of Otto the Great in the 10th century, a marble sarcophagus washed up on Rimini's shores, in the area that became known as Sacramora (lit. 'sacred dwelling'). A spring of pure water surged at the place of the sarcophagus' landing. Giovanni, the abbot of the monastery of St Peter, transported the sarcophagus to the monastery, where it was opened and found to contain the incorrupt body of Julian of Antioch, martyred in Cilicia. The tradition holds that Julian's body was transported to a spur of rock on Marmara Island, and a landslide dislodged it into the sea, leading to its arrival in Rimini.

The sarcophagus was inspected in the 15th century, and for another time in March 1584, when it revealed two coffins, with the lower one empty. On 8 June 1910, the sarcophagus was opened again. It was described as worn: visiting pilgrims would scratch the sarcophagus, believing its powder to be miraculous. Several coins were recovered, ranging in their date from Constantine to Innocent X.
