= Castello Estense =

Medieval castle in Ferrara, Italy

Castle Estense
- Castello Estense (in Italian)
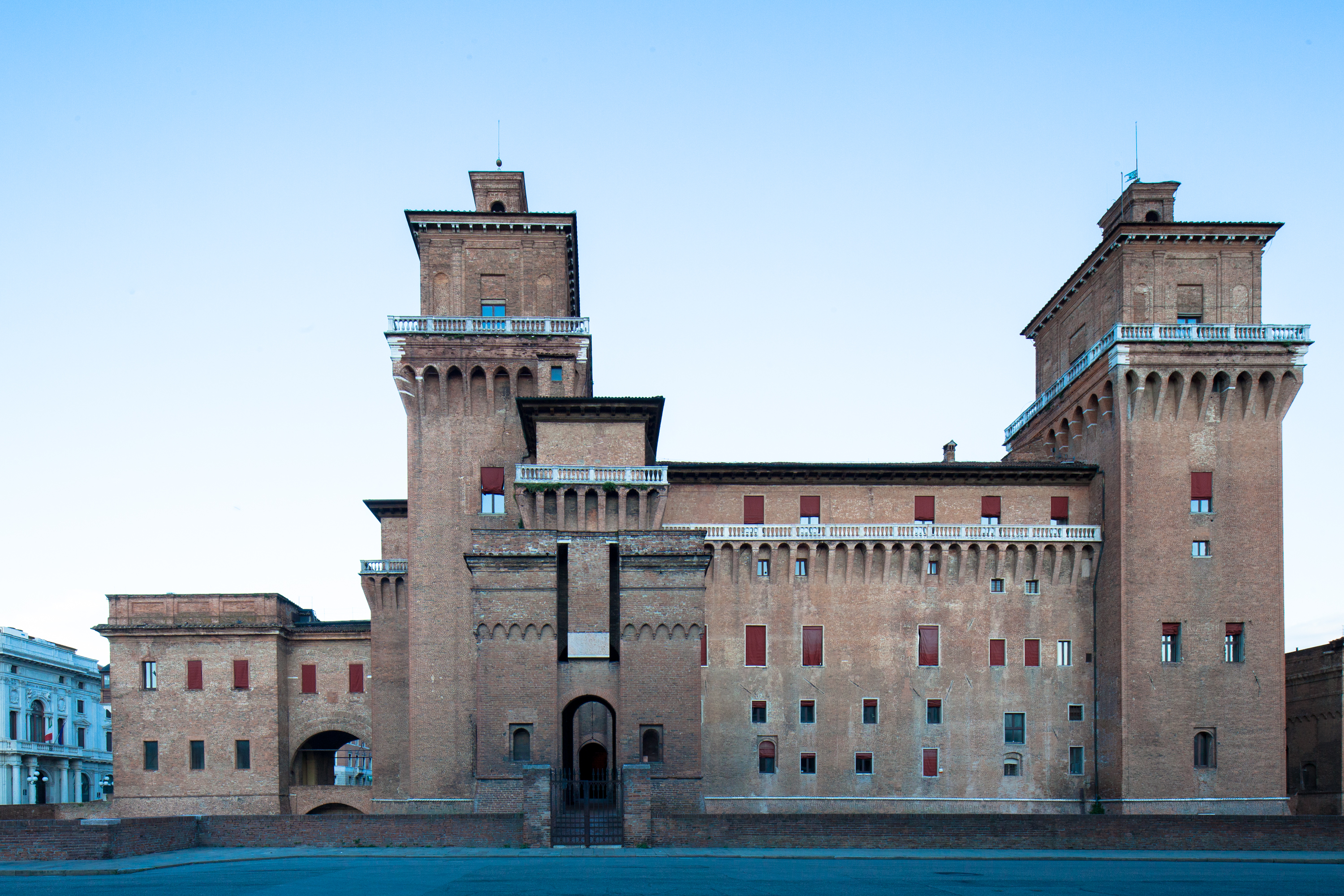
- Exterior view and moat

- Location within Italy

General information
- Architectural style: Renaissance
- Location: Ferrara, Emilia-Romagna, Italy
- Coordinates: 44°50′15″N 11°37′10″E
- Construction started: 29 September 1385
- Client: Niccolò II of Este
- Owner: Province of Ferrara

Design and construction
- Architects: Bartolino da Novara, Girolamo da Carpi

The Castello Estense ('Este castle') or castello di San Michele ('St. Michael's castle') is a moated medieval castle in the center of Ferrara, northern Italy. It consists of a large block with four corner towers.

== History ==
On 3 May 1385, the Ferrarese people, driven to desperation by taxes and flooding that had brought ruin upon them, took themselves to the Marquis Niccolò II d'Este's palace to ask the advice of Tommaso da Tortona, the high official held to be responsible for this grave situation. Nicolò tried to calm the revolt all day, but by the evening it was clear that the people's spirits were getting more and more angry and that the very safety of the Estensi was endangered. The order was therefore given to summon the disgraced Tommaso, who was given confession and communion and then given to the crowd, who literally tore him to pieces.

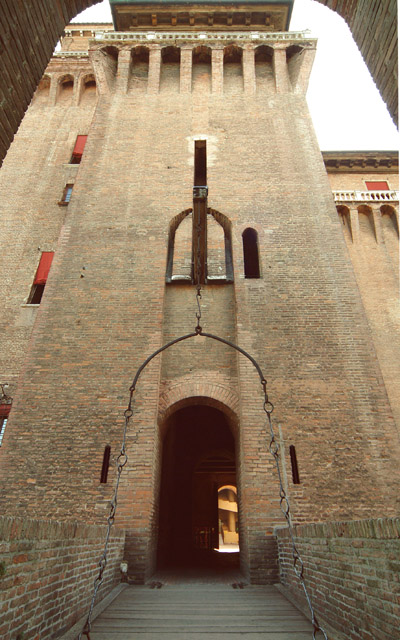
The western drawbridge. The tower features machicolations near the top.

This episode, which resulted later in the death of the leaders of the revolt, convinced the Marquis that the family's palace (which is now the Palazzo Comunale) was insufficient to guarantee the security of the nobility in the event of riots. He therefore ordered the construction of a defensive fortress on the north side of the Palazzo, entrusting the project to the architect Bartolino da Novara. He used a pre-existing tower (the Torre dei Leoni), which was part of the defensive walls, at that period very much to the south of the present ones, running, roughly speaking, along the line of the present Corso Giovecca and Viale Cavour. The tower was joined by curtain walls to another three newly built for this project. Between the Este residence and the new fortress was built an aerial passageway (perhaps in wood) to allow people to flee from one to the other.

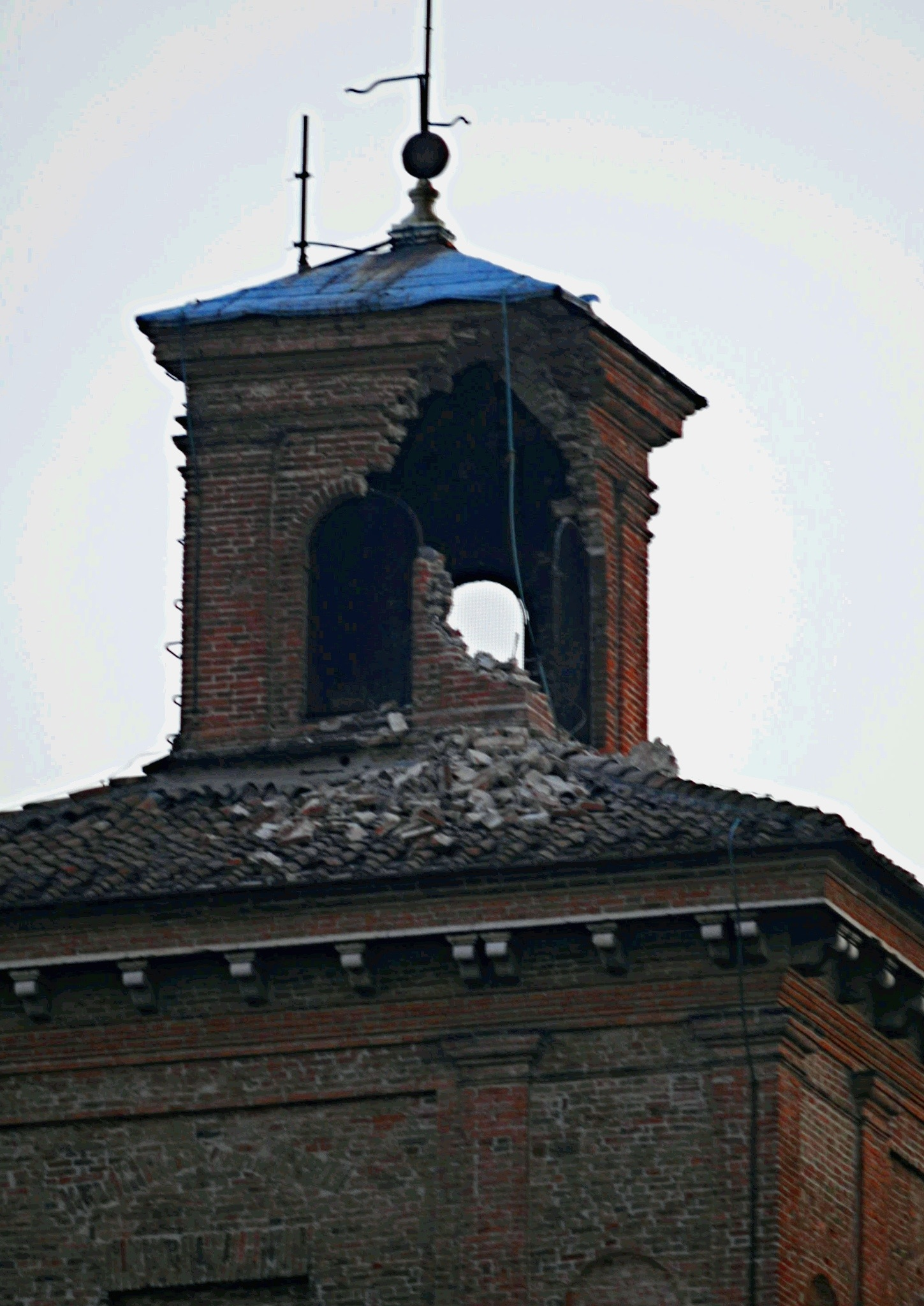
The tower that was damaged in the 2012 earthquake

As the city grew the city walls were moved, so the defensive function of the castle became less important and apartments began to be built in its interior, which was by now considered an annex to the court palace. From the time of Ercole I d'Este on, there are many records of construction of apartments, and of their enlargement and enhancement. The definitive transformation works were ordered by Ercole II after a fire in 1544, which had damaged the previous accommodation. The architect Girolamo da Carpi gave the castle the external appearance which can be still seen today, although the interior has been remodelled several times across the ages. After the departure of the Este to Modena, the castle became the residence of the Papal Legate who administered the Ferrarese territory as civil governor (for a maximum term of four years). There were few changes made to the structure of the building, the most obvious being the increase in height of the north ravelin (the room which currently houses the cafeteria).

In 1860 Ferrara was annexed to the Kingdom of Italy. The castle, now state-owned, was bought for 70,000 liras in 1874 by the Province of Ferrara that utilized the structure as headquarters of the Prefecture. In the subsequent decades, the castle underwent many small restoration projects, especially between 1910 and 1930, when some very questionable attempts were done. During World War II it was severely damaged by Allied aerial bombing, thus it was partially reconstructed in 1946.

In 2002, at the initiative of the Provincial administration, the "Castle for the City" project was started: it involved a massive, €2.7m restoration of the castle and a series of exhibition of international significance, such as: "The Triumph of Bacchus: Masterpieces From the Ferrara School at Dresden", inaugurated in 2002 by the then President of the Republic Carlo Azeglio Ciampi, and "A singular Renaissance: the court of Este in Ferrara", inaugurated in 2003 at the Centre for Fine Arts of Brussels and later in Ferrara at the presence of the then President of the European Commission Romano Prodi. In 2004 the whole project of restoration was completed with two significant events: the inauguration of the €1.7m new museum display ideated by archistar Gae Aulenti and the restoration and temporary opening to visitors of the Camerini d'Alabastro ("alabaster cabinets"), secret rooms built by Alfonso d'Este.

Following the 2012 Northern Italy earthquakes, one of the towers partially collapsed and underwent restoration works.

== Exterior ==
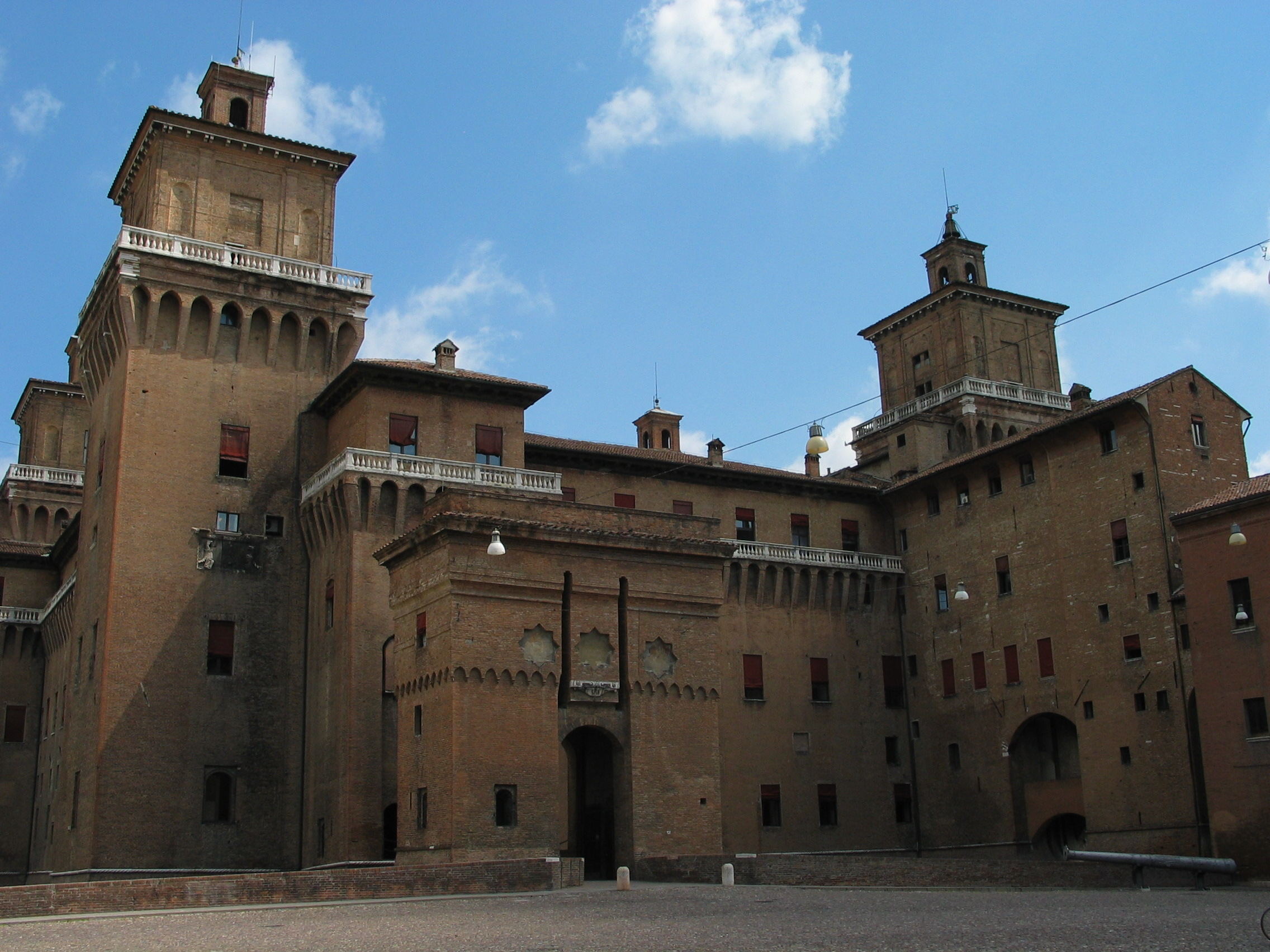
Exterior view, southern side

On the outside, the castle essentially presents the appearance given to it by Girolamo da Carpi in the second half of the 16th century. Surrounded by a moat, it has three entrances with drawbridges fronted by brickwork ravelins. The fourth entrance, to the east, was removed to make room for the kitchens.

At the bottom, the appearance of the building still recalls a mediaeval fortress, but higher up, da Carpi replaced the battlements with elegant balconies in white stone (resting on series of corbels), making it higher again by constructing a higher storey, covered by a skew roof. The towers were improved and made more graceful with roof terraces.

The courtyard, nowadays fairly austere, was frescoed. In particular, at the top were portraits of all the ancestors (real and legendary) of the Este family: the only ones surviving, considerably damaged but still discernible, have been detached and placed under the portico on the east side of the courtyard.

The wells were to provide water in time of drought; the round stone balls that are seen about the place are ammunition for catapults.

== Ground floor ==
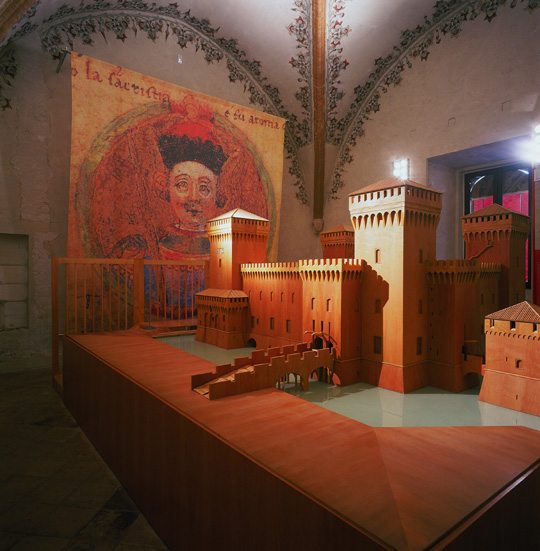
One of the Gothic Rooms contains a small-scale model of the Castle.

=== Gothic Rooms ===
The Gothic Rooms are series of four evocative living rooms with cross-vaulted ceilings. The first is certainly the most beautiful, with rich decorations of clusters of flowers running along the ribs of the vault. The room is dedicated to Nicolà II d'Este (his portrait stands out facing the entrance), who built the castle. At the centre is found a magnificent reconstruction in wood of the castle in the early years of its existence. The three following rooms are dedicated to the Marquises Alberto, Niccolò III and Leonello, and finally Borso, the first duke of the dynasty. A series of panels illustrates the political and cultural life of the period.

=== Kitchens ===
The east ravelin of the castle was enlarged and used to house the court kitchens. The first of the two rooms, long and narrow, shows signs of the two distinct functions, military and civil, that it had over the course of time: opposite the entrance can be seen a chimney pipe from the kitchen, while along the inside walls are found arrow-slits for archers, some walled up so as to be nearly useless. In the second room, much bigger and lighter, some stoves have been reconstructed. On one wall is seen the portrait of Cristoforo di Messisbugo, the most famous of the Este's 'Scalcos' – the Scalco was the official who supervised many of the practical aspects of court life, organised spectacles, directed the kitchens, and readied things whenever necessary for moves to and from the family's country residences, etc.

=== Dungeons ===
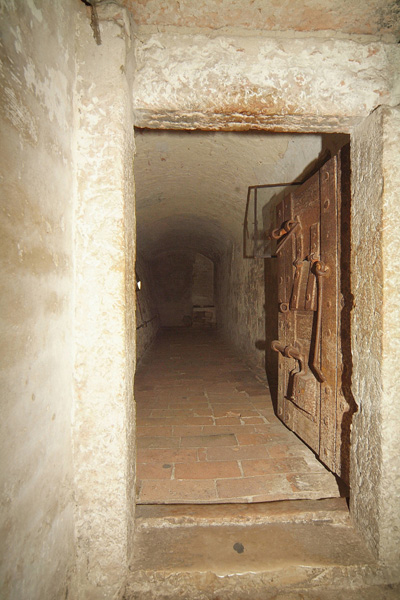
The doorway to the dungeon

Shortly after entering a narrow corridor, on the left the low deep doorway that leads into the Don Giulio's dungeon, once allotted for a cell and perhaps also a torture chamber. Notably Giulio d’Este was shut up in this cell for many years; he was the legitimate brother of Alfonso I and the lead actor in a famous and unhappy affair. Going back onto the corridor that goes around the cell, a steep and narrow stairway leads to the cells that held the unlucky lovers Ugo and Parisina. Parisina Malatesta was the second wife of Marquis Niccolò III, who was something of a rake and a great deal older than her. After seven years of marriage that had been generally quite calm, she ended up falling in love with her stepson Ugo, son of the Marquis and Stella dei Tolomei, and he with her. The two young people were discovered, subjected to a rapid trial and finally beheaded. It was 1425; Parisina was 20 years old, Ugo only 19. Coming down the stairway, on the left was Parisina's cell. Following the corridor is Ugo's one, having, on the ceiling, prisoners' writing done with candle smoke.

=== Lion's Tower ===
Before 1385, since at least one hundred years, on the site where the Castle of Saint Michael was built, an old watchtower stood to defend the northern line of the city walls and, more exactly, the near strategic gate called of the Lion, beyond which a small homonymous district extended. A large canal, that flew into the river Po with its tributaries, defended the northern stretch of walls. At that period the town had developed alongside the left bank of the main branch of the river, whose course in that point opened eastward to form a vast delta. Water provided places, suburbs and the town itself with the most effective protection. Not very long before the construction of the Castle, the watchtower underwent a transformation, ordered by Nicolò II and probably carried out by the same Bartolino da Novara, who would both later have been the future patron and architect of the Castle. Thus, from a high, rectilinear square-planned tower, intended for surveillance and sighting, it turned into a small fort with a much wider base and larger battlements on the first floor, well-equipped according to the latest military defensive techniques. A ramp, that ran along three sides of the stronghold, allowed access to the battlements and was meant to facilitate transport of weapons, artillery and other such loads with the help of animals. The vast rooms at the ground and first floors were used as headquarters for the Este soldiery, whereas the prisons were located in the dark basement. The exterior structure of the stronghold looked the same on all four sides.

== First floor ==
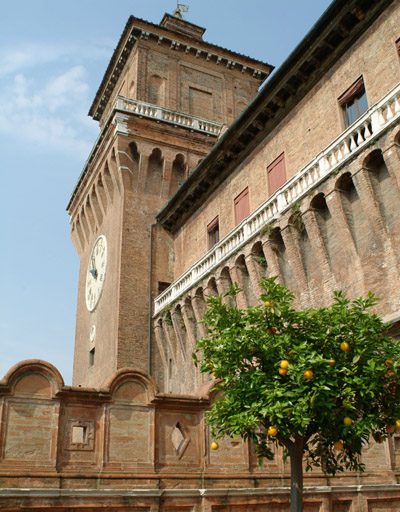
Garden of the Oranges

=== The Courts ===
The Courts have several rooms with remains of frescoes and panels describing the different apartments of the castle.

=== Loggia and Garden of the Oranges ===
The Garden of the Oranges assumed its current size and characteristics under Alfonso I and evokes powerfully the presence of the court, standing here unseen by the people, amid the perfume of the orange blossoms, admiring the city. The wall of the hanging garden was constructed following the plans of Girolamo da Carpi. Archive documents are rich in observations about the hanging gardens and these have allowed the reconstruction of their various arrangements: from little paths among large flowerbeds (whose soil had been carried up here) of annual plants, to the 18th century arrangement, which featured only citrus plants, in pots that were sheltered in the winter in a Loggia used as a greenhouse.

=== Cabinet of the Bacchanalia ===
This is a little passageway that was at one time completely painted; the right-hand wall still shows three scenes inspired by the myth of Bacchus.

=== Ducal Chapel ===
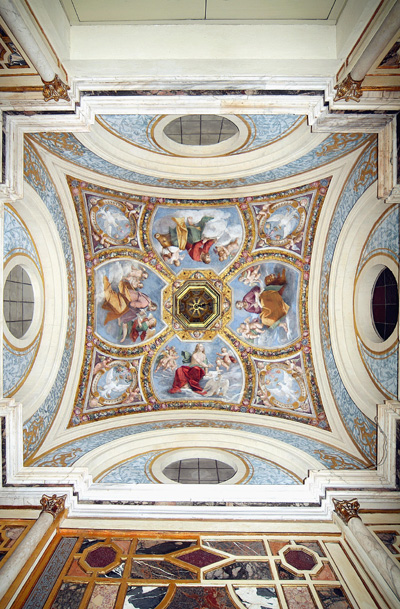
Ducal Chapel: ceiling decorated with the Four Evangelists fresco

The Ducal Chapel is a little room with elegant geometric lines, destinated to private praying. An old tradition argued that Renée de France – wife of Duke Ercole II of Este who had Calvinist sympathies – ordered this particular decoration, without sacred images. On the walls, coated all over with precious polychrome marbles, no sacred image – either painted or in mosaic – is actually represented, as one would at least expect in the small niches. The vault, conversely, is decorated with frescoes portraying the Four Evangelists against a light blue background, surrounded by cherubs, each of them respectively recognizable by the lion (Saint Mark), the eagle (Saint Luke), the angel (Saint Matthew) and the bull (Saint John) in accordance with the iconographic tradition.

=== Chamber of Dawn ===
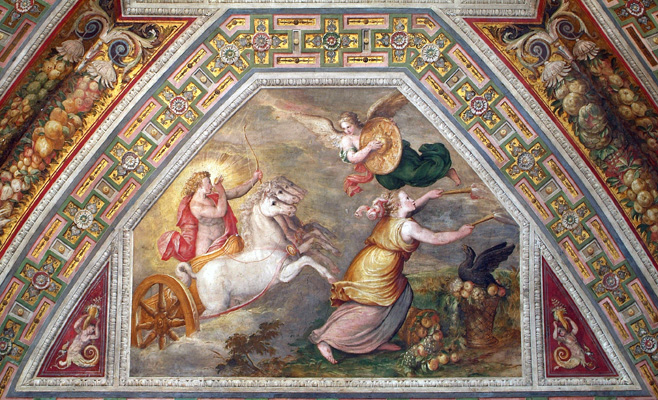
Fresco in the Chamber of Dawn

Located inside the Lion's Tower, the Chamber of Dawn is decorated with a sumptuous ceiling representing the four parts of the day: on the right (coming in from the chapel) is the Dawn, a young winged Goddess who advances pulling the horses of the sun's chariot by their reins. Proceeding then in a clockwise direction is the Day, when the chariot of the sun proceeds in all its shining glory, preceded by Dawn with two torches in her hands; then the Dusk, with the chariot of the sun going away towards the horizon; and Night, where Diana, with the lunar disc on her forehead, rejoins her lover Endymion. At the centre is an old man representing the Time, seated between the three Fates – Goddesses of Life and Death. In the lower part is a long procession of cherubs on chariots drawn by every type of animal. The great mirrors that are a feature of this room and the two following were set there by the curator of the restoration, Gae Aulenti, recalling the name of these rooms, recorded in documents as "The Mirror Suite".

=== Saletta dei Giochi ===
The Saletta dei Giochi ("Small Chamber of Games") has a ceiling decorated, in the centre, with the round dance of the Four Seasons, and around that frescoes with scenes of the Games of Ancient Rome; on the long side a Bacchanal; opposite that the Basket Fight, a sort of boxing in which the competitors had around their hands bandages called 'baskets'. On the two short walls are represented Gladiator fights. At the bottom, scenes of children's games rendered in the artistic style of Ancient Rome. From the Saletta dei Giochi it's possible to climb right up to the balustrade of the Lion's Tower, from which it is possible to enjoy a good panoramic view of the city of Ferrara.

=== Saletta dei Veleni ===
The Saletta dei Veleni ("Small Chamber of Poisons") seems to have been used originally by the court pharmacists to produce medicine and, according to some, also the poisons used against political enemies. The ceiling is from the 20th century and represents Italy surrounded by symbols of conquest from the fascist period.

=== The Hall of Games ===
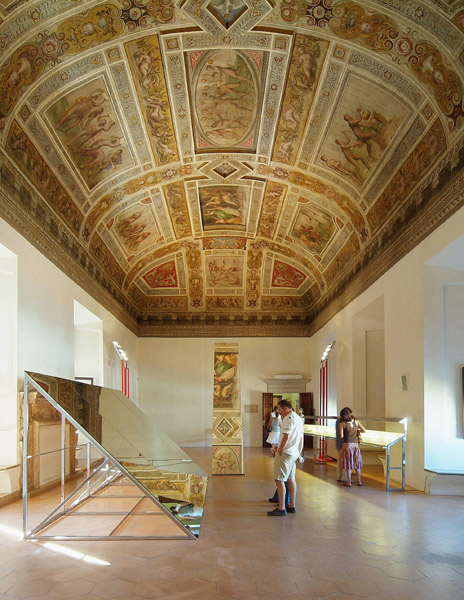
The Hall of Games

This large room was intended for evening amusements, whether concerts or games. The ceiling is divided into eleven panels, each one containing a scene describing a different sport, following the passions of Duke Alfonso II. Not all of them are painted in the same style: the ones on the courtyard side are by Bastianino and represent, from left to right: the all-in wrestling, the lancio delle pietre (a kind of discus throw performed with stones), and the Greco-Roman wrestling. The athletes are naked in deference to the tradition of ancient Greece. Also, by Bastianino is the panel depicting swimming, on the short side next to the Greco-Roman wrestling.

=== Appartamento della Pazienza ===
At one time this was the first room of the Appartamento della Pazienza ("Patience Suite"), made for Ercole II. Its decoration is late, with a neo-Renaissance ceiling; at the edge are represented the signs of the Zodiac. The room is dominated by an enormous reproduction of an 18th-century panorama of Ferrara by Andrea Bolzoni.

=== Gallery anteroom ===
The neo-Renaissance ceiling displays some of the Este coats of arms. The space is dominated by a large panel that reproduces an antique print showing Ferrara at the end of the 15th century, when the architect Biagio Rossetti had started the enlargement of the city ordered by Ercole I (the Addizione Erculea) and the new walls had already been built to the North, with the old walls still awaiting demolition. The still navigable Po is in foreground position. At the end of the main piazza (on the right the cathedral, on the left the Palazzo Ducale, behind which are poking out the towers of the Castle), is portrayed a gate which closes it off, while behind the built-up areas the old walls can be seen. Higher up is a second circuit of walls, surrounding a thinly populated area.

=== Hector and Andromache Room ===
This room was created by shortening the Gallery. In the 19th century Cardinal Tommaso Benetti had the ceiling decorated with an epic scene: Hector leaving his son and his wife Andromache (Iliad Book VI). The large panel reproduces a fresco with a representation of Estense territory: the Duchy of Ferrara at the centre, with Modena and Reggio on the left.

=== Gallery Room ===
All that remains of that large chamber has lost all trace of decoration. Originally on the walls there were frescoed views of the city. The panels are dedicated to the countryside residences of the House of Este for retreat and pleasure. The large panel shows the Ferrara region during the Napoleonic era.

=== The land reclamation projects ===
This room is dedicated to the works of land reclamation that characterized the territory of the Province of Ferrara along the centuries.

=== Saint Paul's Tower ===
The Saint Paul's Tower was built on the South-west corner of the Castle as the stronghold to the building's main entrance. The tower points towards the site upon which the church of San Giuliano was re-built (visible from the windows). The little church was demolished in 1385 to allow the construction of the new building, and for this reason the tower is now sometimes referred to as the tower of San Giuliano. The wall designs in tempera are dedicated to images of Diana and other divinities, whereas on the ceiling, between large sections supporting light architectural structures, the four seasons are illustrated in small panels.

=== Government anteroom ===
Those who requested audience with the Duke waited in this little room. The ceiling is richly frescoed. The floor is from the Este period.

=== Government Room ===
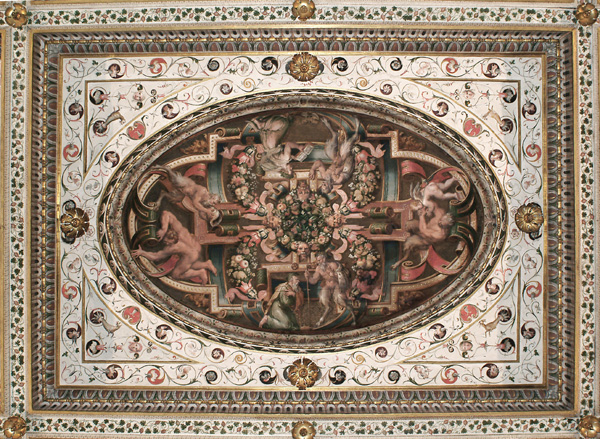
The ceiling of the Government Room

Created for Ercole II (1534–1559) to deal with the business of government, it still displays its splendid original ceiling with painted and gilded lacunars (recessed panels), one of the most beautiful in this style in the whole of Italy. In the centre, in the large oval, is represented the Myth of Pan. Other Mythical forms are found in the other panels: the whole should be read as a celebration of the Prince and his good government.

=== Devolution Room ===
The ceiling, dating to the 19th century, represents the devolution of Ferrara from the House of Este domination to that of the Papal States in 1598. The four pictures are to be read clockwise, starting from the side nearest the Sala del Governo: in the first one, Lucrezia d’Este, sent by the Duke of Ferrara, is conversing with Cardinal Pietro Aldobrandini, the Pope's nephew; in front, two secretaries are drawing up the Agreement which was then to be signed by these two plenipotentiaries. In the second, Duke Cesare d'Este, surrounded by dignitaries, leaves the city he has lost, on horseback, bound for Modena, which he had declared the new capital of his State. On the third, Cardinal Aldobrandini arrives in Ferrara the day after the Duke's departure. In the fourth, finally, one of the many festivities organised in honour of Pope Clement VIII, come to take possession of the city: in the castle moat, ladies from Comacchio race the typical boats of the lagoons, the batane.

=== Landscapes Room ===
This room takes its name from the band decorated with fine landscape frescoes, painted in the 18th century by an unknown hand (perhaps Giuseppe Zola).

=== Geography Room ===
Situated in the Torre Marchesana, otherwise called the Clock Tower, this hall has noteworthy maps of Ferrara territory created in 1709–1710. The enormous area once covered by water and marshes has for mostly disappeared today, in the wake of the great land reclamation works that were concluded in the 1930s.

=== Coats of Arms Room ===
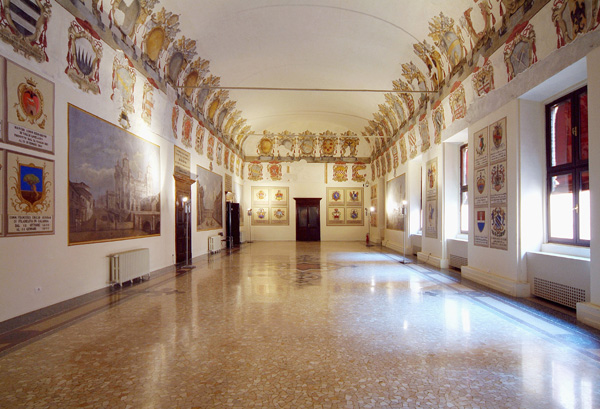
Coats of Arms Room

The room displays two series of decorations from the Papal States period. The older is a long series of coat of arms with the Papal tiara and the Keys of St. Peter; one part is taken up with the coats of arms of the Popes from Clement VIII (1592–1605) to Pius VI (1775–1799), the others are empty. Beneath this is a decoration with the coats of arms of the Cardinal Papal Legates who had their residence in the castle: some are visible on the upper part of all four walls. The lower part is however occupied by a decoration made in 1857 on the occasion of the visit of Pope Pius IX, which completely hid the earlier paintings. More coats of arms and some views of the Ferrarese territory of that time: the city of Ferrara (the Castle), Comacchio (the Trepponti), Cento (the main square), Lugo di Romagna (the porticoes), Pomposa Abbey and Bagnacavallo.

=== Council Room ===
In 1919 when the First World War ended, an ambitious restoration project was started that had been under discussion since 1916. The works included the decoration, furniture and lighting of the Council Room. This room bears witness of developments of the liberty into Art Deco design that can be seen in the ornate oriental-like painting on the ceilings, in the mirroring of ceramic mosaics featuring the coat of arms of the city of Ferrara, in the panel with emblems of poppies waving among the wheat that surround the Province's coat of arms above the president's chair. This same emblem is repeated on one of the six doors, whereas, on the others we find eels amidst waves and seaweed, squirrels on blossoming branches, swallows in vineyards, woodcocks in the marshes and dragonflies and butterflies amidst the corn.
