= Archistar =

Archistar is a software framework to build secure distributed storage systems for cloud usage on the basis of secure fragmentation and information dispersal. The Archistar framework combines methods from Byzantine fault tolerance, secret sharing, and additional tools from cloud cryptography.

A stated goal is to provide a base framework for further research into the topic. To achieve this, it focuses on readability and has used open-source licenses (GPLv2 and LGPLv2) for all prototype code. For better readability, self-contained aspects are extracted into libraries, specifically one for secret sharing and one for the BFT state-machine.

The first version of the Java implementations were developed in a research project funded by the Austrian Ministry of Transport and the current version is maintained and extended as part of the EU funded research project PRISMACLOUD.

== See also ==
- Byzantine Fault Tolerance
- Secure multi-party computation
- Shamir's Secret Sharing
