= Bittino da Faenza =

Italian painter (1357–1427)

Bitino or Bittino da Faenza (1357–1427) was an Italian Renaissance painter, active in Rimini during the late 14th and early 15th century. Among his only works is a polyptych (1409) about episodes of the Life of St Julian found in the Church of San Giuliano Martire in Rimini.
