= San Giuliano, Ferrara =

Roman Catholic church in Ferrara, Italy

Coordinates: 44°50′14.9″N 11°37′06.0″E

San Giuliano
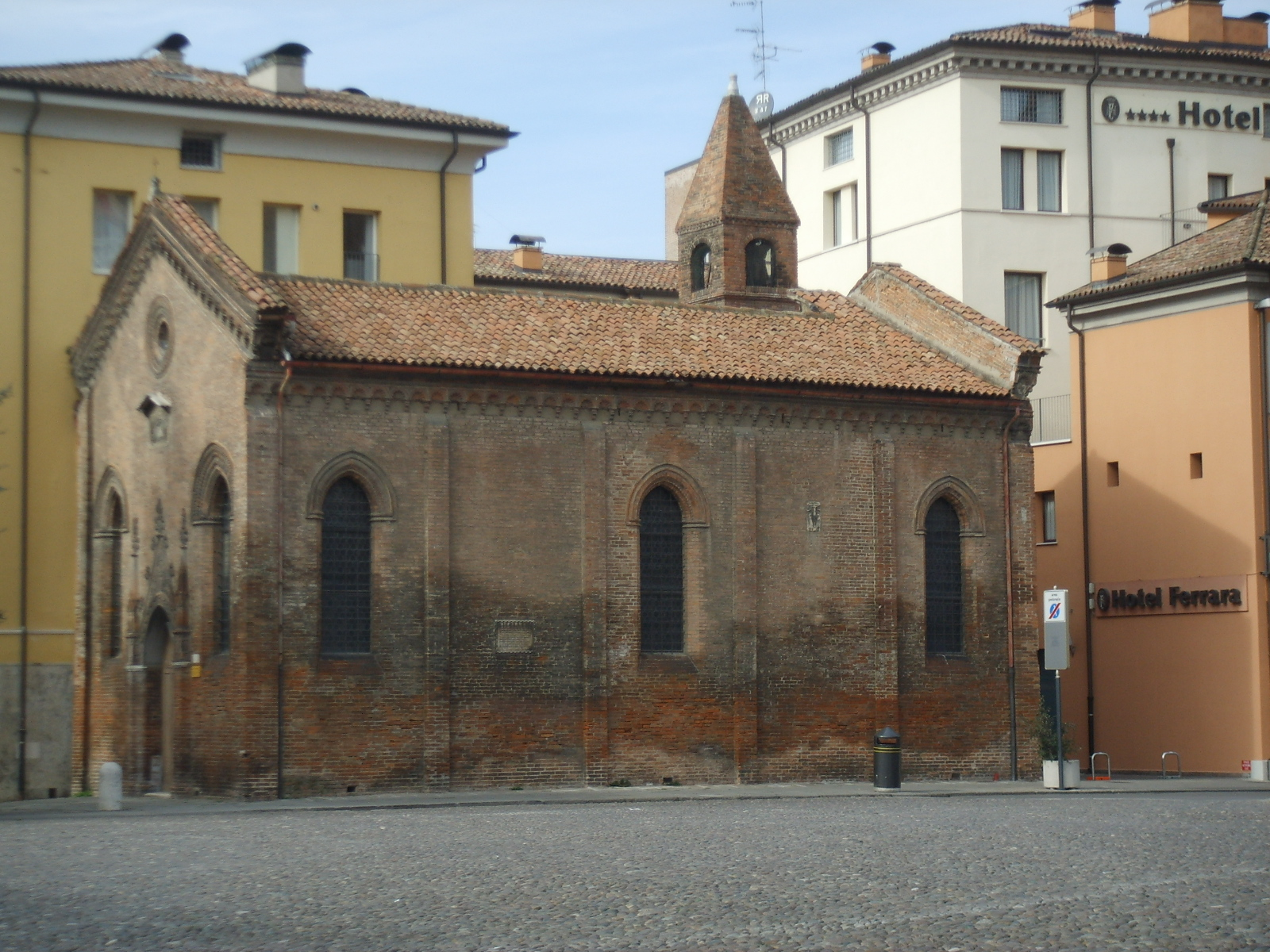
- San Giuliano

Religion
- Affiliation: Roman Catholic
- Province: Ferrara

Location
- Location: Ferrara, Italy
- Interactive map of San Giuliano

Architecture
- Type: Church
- Style: Gothic

San Giuliano is a small Gothic-style, Roman Catholic church located on the Piazzetta delle Castello on the southwest corner of the Castello Estense in Ferrara, region of Emilia-Romagna, Italy.

== History ==
A parish church was previously located at the site of the Castello Estense; in 1385, this church along with an entire neighborhood were razed to build the castle. Soon after, by 1405, the church was rebuilt in a former Gothic architecture style, and affiliated with the Order of the Santo Sepolcro.

The facade and windows are narrow and peaked. The portal has spires in relief, atop the spires are St Gabriel and the virgin with Christ in the center. Above below the oculus is a peculiar relief depicting an bizarre episode in the life of the namesake saint, St Julian the Hospitaller (San Giuliano l’Ospitaliere), wherein he unknowingly slays his visiting parents while they sleep.

The reconstruction of the church had been patronized by Galeotto Avogadri, proto-camerlengo of the marchese Nicolò III. The small church had altars dedicated to the Albergatori (inn-keepers), Orefici (jewelers), and of the Arte dei Beccai, which included the trades of fishmongers, butchers, and restauranteers. The church is presently considered the church of journalists, and in 1952, restoration was patronized by Cristiano Nicovich and employed Carlo Savonuzzi.

An inventory in the 18th century recalled an altarpiece for San Giuliano by Giacomo Bambini and Cesare Croma; a Bishop St Eligio attributed to either Scarsella or Pordenone; a St Andrew by Bartolommeo Solati; and a St Luke by Menagatti. In 1846, the church is referred to as an oratory. It had been, for some decades, deconsecrated.
