= Girolamo da Carpi =

Italian painter (1501–1556)

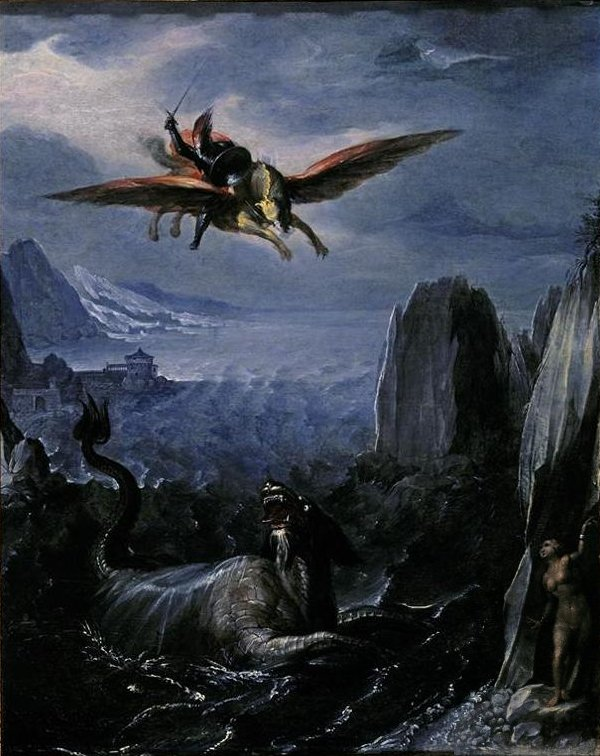
'Ruggiero Saving Angelica', tempera on wood, attributed to Girolamo da Carpi, El Paso Museum of Art

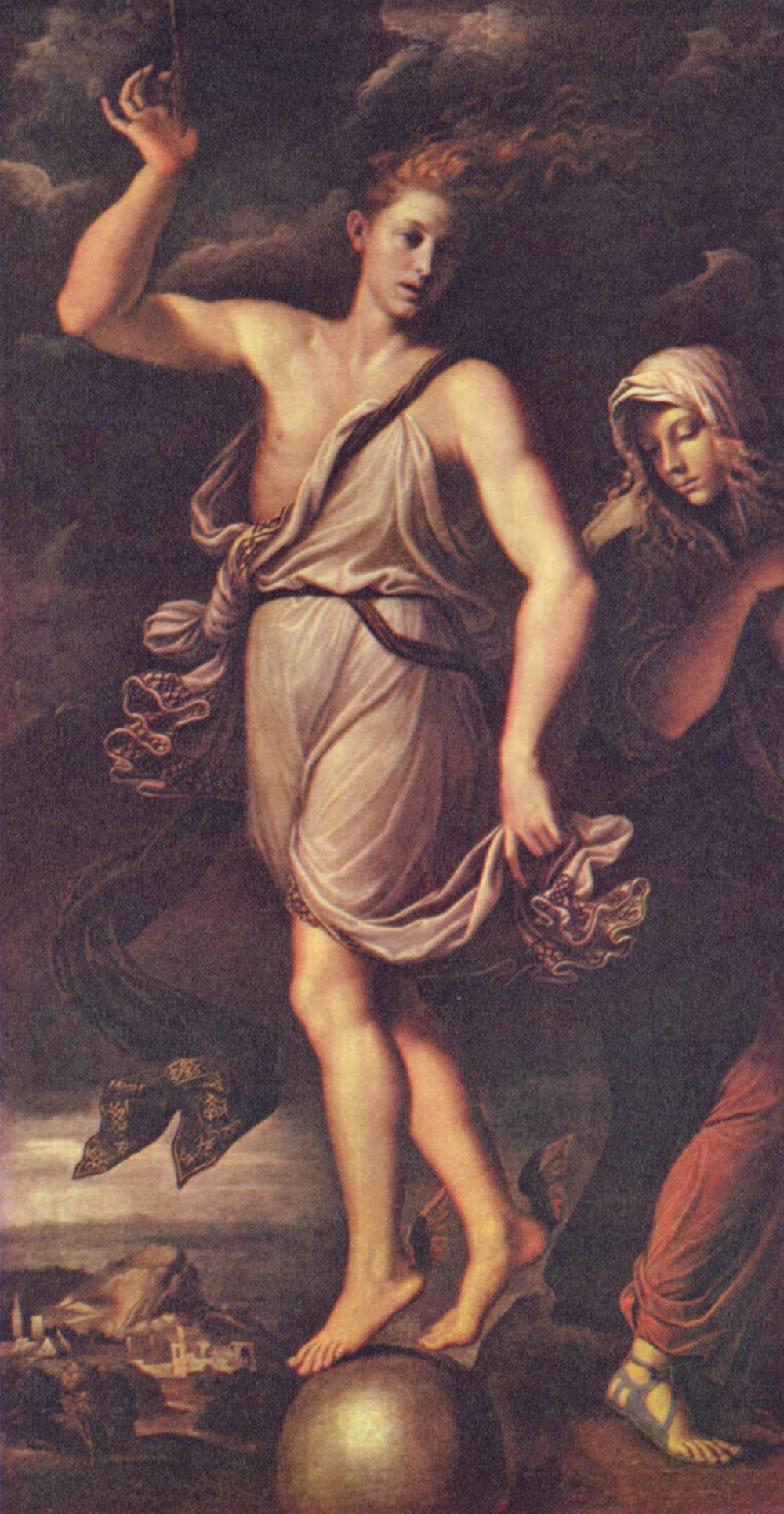
Opportunity and Remorse by Girolamo da Carpi (1541), at Gemäldegalerie, Dresden

Girolamo Da Carpi (1501 – 1 August 1556) was an Italian painter and decorator who worked at the Court of the House of Este in Ferrara. He began painting in Ferrara, by report apprenticing to Benvenuto Tisi (il Garofalo); but by age 20, he had moved to Bologna, and is considered a figure of Early Renaissance painting of the local Bolognese School.

== Career ==
He trained in the studio of a local painter who showed the influence of Lorenzo Costa and Raphael. In the 1520s Girolamo visited Rome and Bologna and was inspired by the Mannerist style of Giulio Romano. Geographically and stylistically he straddles the various influences.

He returned to Ferrara and collaborated with Dosso Dossi and Garofalo among others on commissions for the d’Este family. Girolamo became the architect to Pope Julius III in 1550 and supervised the remodeling of the Vatican's belvedere. Returning to Ferrara, he was charged of the enlargements of the Castello Estense.

Da Carpi's paintings include a Descent of the Holy Spirit in the church of St Francis at Rovigo; a Madonna; an Adoration of the Magi and a St. Catharine at Bologna; and a St George and St Jerome at Ferrara.

Among the pupils of Girolamo da Carpi were Bartolomeo Faccini and Ippolito Costa.

== Selected works ==
- Landscape with Magical Procession (circa 1525, attr.); Galleria Borghese, Rome
- Adoration of the Magi (1531; San Martino, Bologna)
- Marriage of Saint Catherine (1532–1534; Santissimo Salvatore, Bologna)
- St. Longinus (1531)
- Pentecost (San Francesco, Rovigo)
- Opportunity and Remorse (1541; Gemäldegalerie, Dresden)
