= Estense Lapidary Museum =

Italian archaeology museum

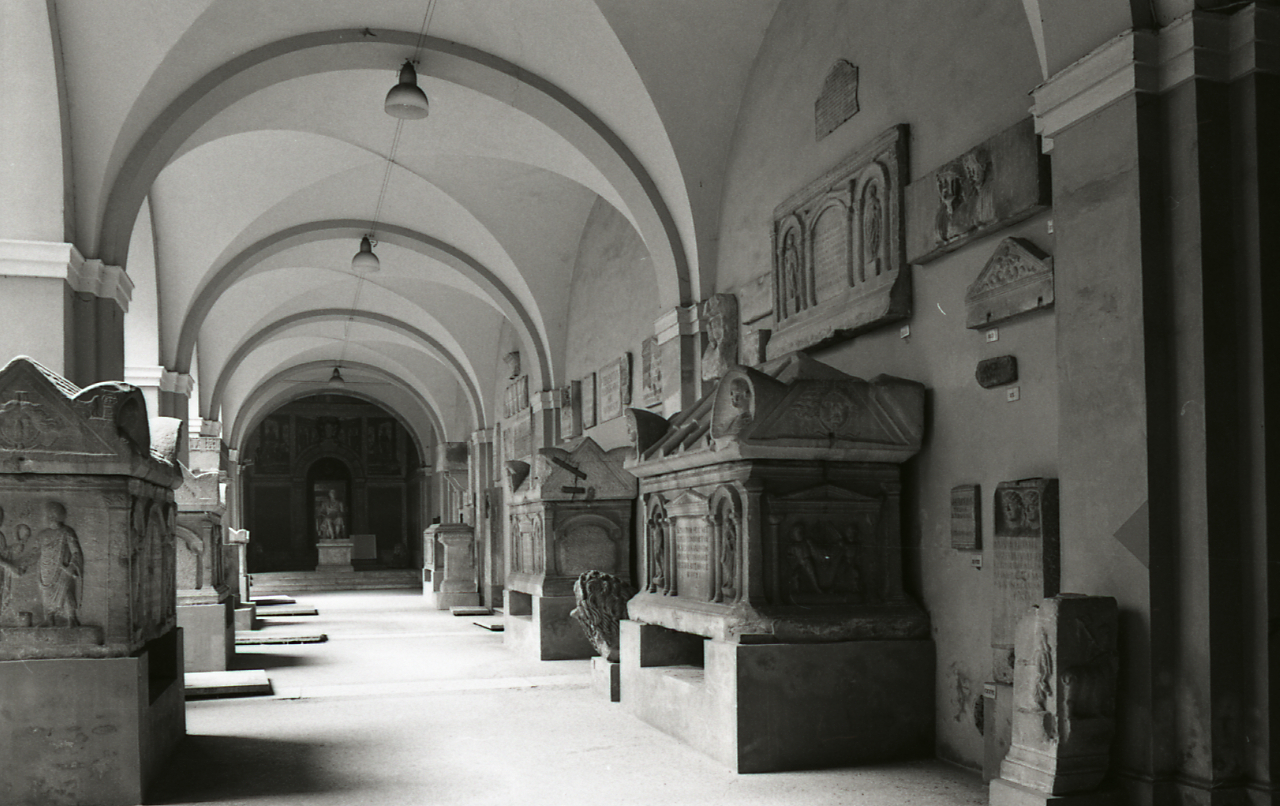
- The museum in 1977
- Established: 1828
- Location: Modena, Italy
- Type: Archaeology museum
- Director: Martina Bagnoli
- Website: www.gallerie-estensi.beniculturali.it/museo-lapidario-estense/

The Estense Lapidary Museum is a lapidarium-museum in Modena, Italy, located around the interior quadrangle of the Palazzo dei Musei's ground floor. It is owned by the province of Modena and the Gallerie Estensi. As the first public museum to be commissioned by the Duke Francesco IV d'Este upon his re-entry into Modena in 1814, it stands as a symbol of the collaboration between church, state and nobility. It also marks a new direction for the city of Modena, one recognising its rich historical identity.

== History ==
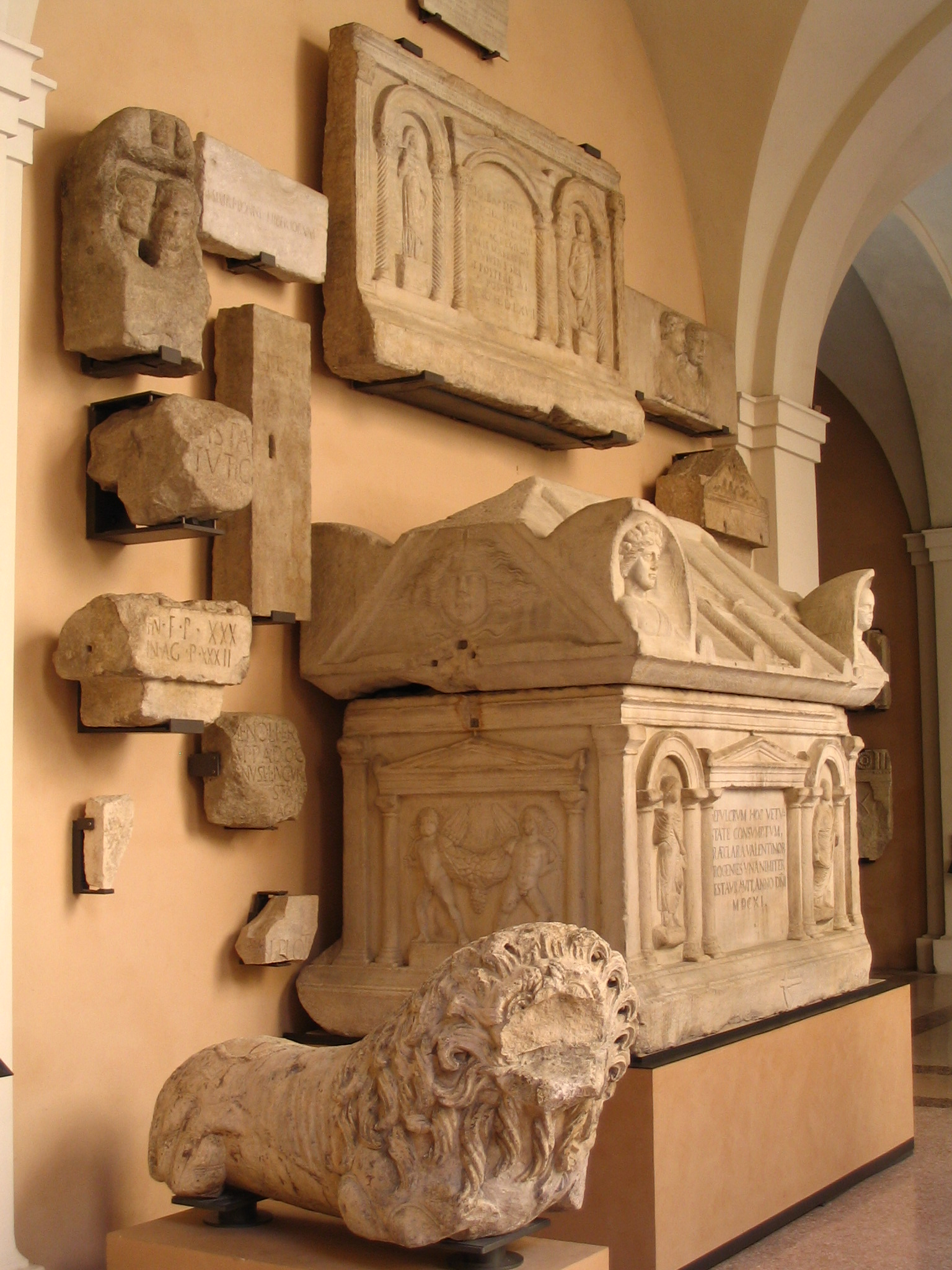
View of the Roman section with sarcophagi, inscriptions and sculptures displayed around the open courtyard of the museum.

The museum was built around an initial nucleus of antique stone objects already present within the Estense collection, thanks to Alfonso II d'Este's Ferrarese antique-dealer and Renaissance humanist Cardinal Rodolfo Pio da Carpi, who harboured a collection of Roman bronze coins and marble sculptures. It was later enriched with archaeological remains from the provinces of Modena and Reggio Emilia. The museum was inaugurated in 1828 by Francesco IV, with the first catalogue being written in 1830 by curator of the Museum institution Carlo Malmusi. In it, Malmusi described the museum as "a perfect testament to the Royal magnificence with which the duke's glorious ancestors used to create" (Note: C. Malmusi, in "Atti Deputazione Storia Patria Province di Modena e Parma," p. VIII, 1872, Modena.)

== Exhibition ==
The collection includes a multitude of partially and wholly complete limestone and marble stele and reliefs. Many of the exhibits are funerary monuments, notably inscribed Roman sarcophagi originating from Ravenna in the 2nd and 3rd centuries A.D. Many of the museum's corridors are dedicated to the local remains in and around Modena from 183 BC when it became the Roman military colony of Mutina. The collections also contain works transferred from Modena's cathedral (such as Wiligelmo's Romanesque sculptures) and neighbouring city churches, in the interest of preserving such antique works following the unification of Italy from 1815-1871.

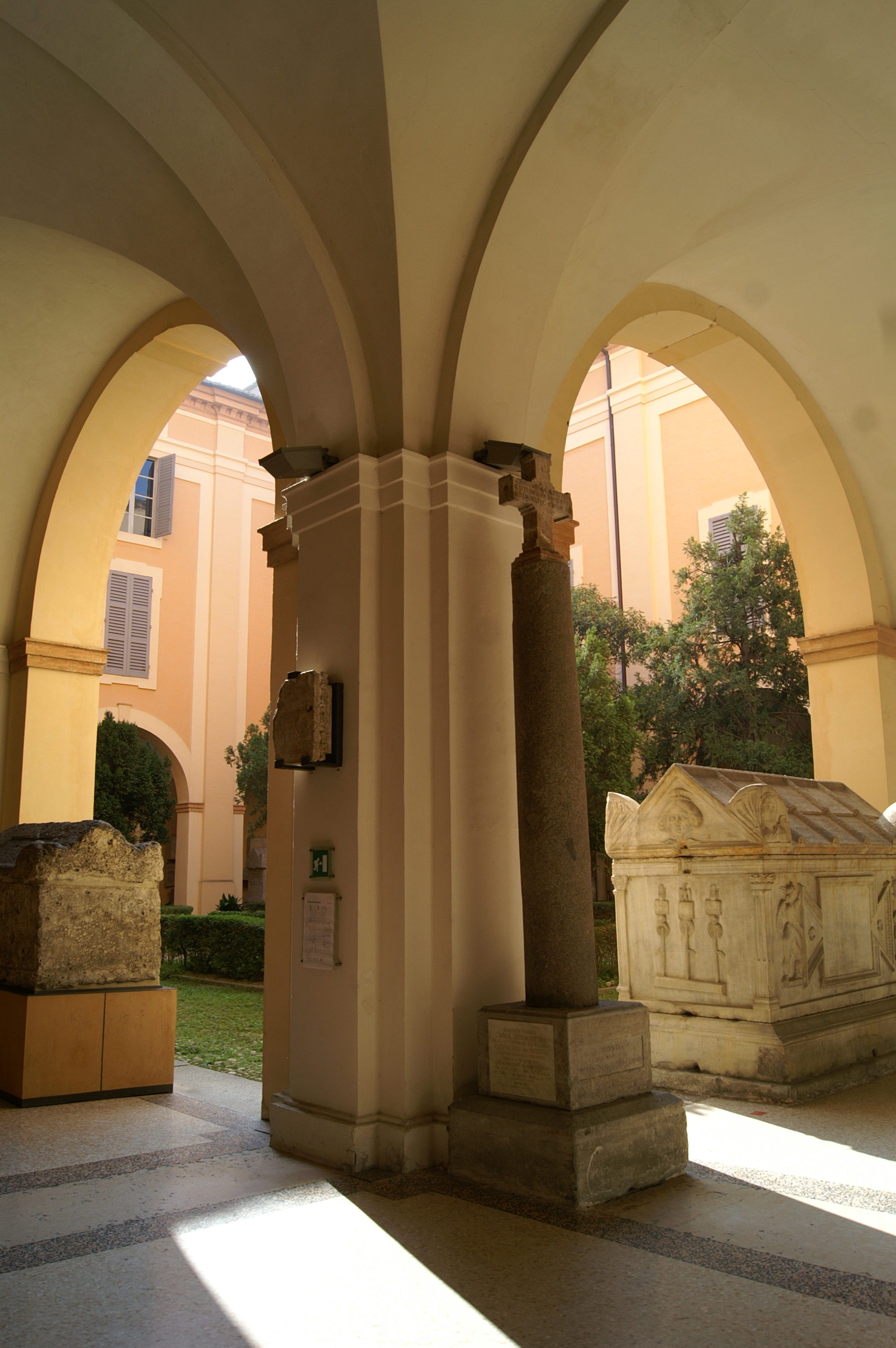
Preserved medieval columns in the inner loggia of the Estense Lapidary Museum.

== See also ==
- Biblioteca Estense
- Pinacoteca Nazionale in Ferrara
- Ducal Palace of Sassuolo

== Bibliography ==
- Nicoletta Giordani, Giovanna, Paolozzi Strozzi, The Estense Lapidary Museum, Modena 2003.
- Nicoletta Giordani, Giovanna, Paolozzi Strozzi (edited by) Museo Lapidario Estense. General catalogue, Venice 2005.
