= Ducal Palace of Sassuolo =

Palace in Emilia-Romagna, Italy

Coordinates: 44°32′33″N 10°46′48″E

- Palazzo ducale di Sassuolo
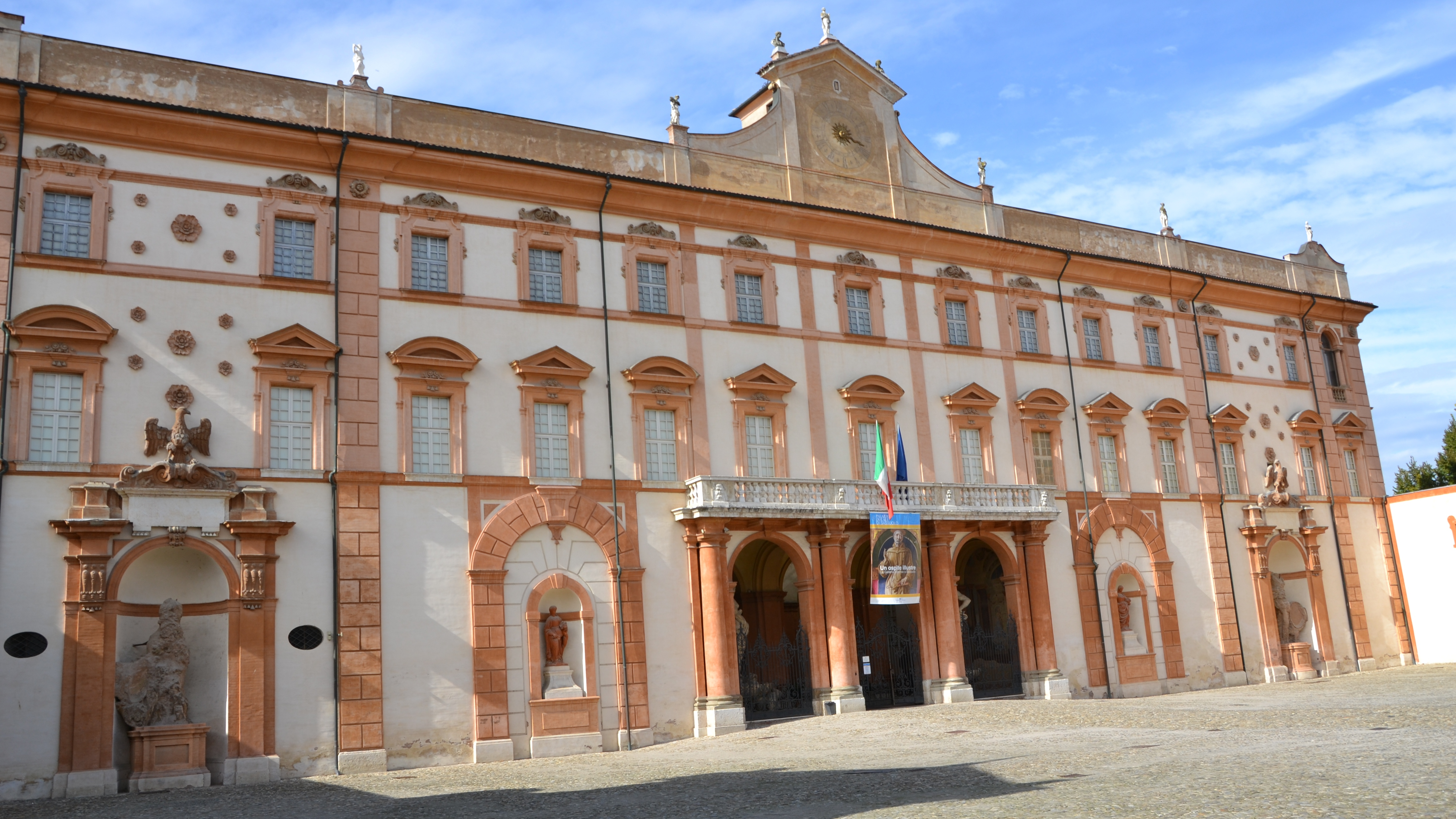
- Façade of the Ducal Palace of Sassuolo.
- Interactive map of the Ducal Palace of Sassuolo area

General information
- Type: Palace
- Architectural style: Italian Baroque
- Location: Sassuolo, Province of Modena, Italy
- Client: Francesco I d'Este

Technical details
- Floor count: 3

Design and construction
- Architect: Bartolomeo Avanzini

Website
- www.gallerie-estensi.beniculturali.it/palazzo-ducale

The Ducal Palace of Sassuolo (Italian: Palazzo ducale di Sassuolo) is a Baroque villa located in the town of Sassuolo, thirty minutes outside Modena, northern Italy.

== History ==
The palace was built on the site of a medieval castle or rocca. Obtained by Niccolò III d'Este from the della Rosa family in the 15th century, and converted into a court residence by Borso d'Este in 1458.

The exterior facade seems to reference Tuscan villas more than those of the Veneto. In the mid-16th century, the first pleasure summer villa was built on the site. In the early 17th century, the Duke Francesco I d'Este commissioned the present building from the architect Bartolomeo Avanzini. Over the centuries, the palace has had many owners, but is now owned by the town of Sassuolo and the Gallerie Estensi, who contributed to the picture galleries the Orlando, Princess and Secchia apartments.

== The exhibition ==
The palace is best known for its highly decorated interior frescoes (1638–1656) by the French Este court painter Jean Boulanger, as well as several perspectival ceilings by Ottavio Vivani, Giacomo Cialdieri, Angelo Michele Colonna, Agostino Mitelli, Baldassare Bianchi and Giovanni Giacomo Monti. Lattanzio Maschio and Luca Colombi were also invited by Boulanger to work on the palace stucco decoration. Giovanni Lazzoni, Nicolas Régnier, Salvator Rosa, and Ludovico Lana also contributed to the palace's art collection.

The palace is also known for its garden vistas reminiscent of Versailles and its fanciful Peschiera or fish-tank. The latter was originally designed by Avanzini and Gaspare Vigarani as a large rectangular "pool" surrounded by a boundary wall in the form of a ruined amphitheatre, for which it earned its sobriquet the "Fontanazzo" (Rough Fountain). Highlights of the complex also include larger-than-life fountain sculptures based on the designs of Gian Lorenzo Bernini and Renaissance fresco fragments by Nicolò dell’Abbate recovered from the Scandiano palace in Reggio Emilia.

Restoration of the piano nobile in 2001 has allowed the palace to be equally used as a space for contemporary art exhibitions, fusing past and present. Terminating the tour of the Duke and Duchesses’ private and public apartments on the first floor, the Stuccoed apartments have hosted the exhibition “MONOCHROMATIC LIGHT” since 2003. The gilded reliefs previously framing the duke's favourite artworks shall house various minimalist pieces donated by the Panza collection until 2103.

== Key works ==
· The Musicians of the Scandiano Room of Paradise frescoes by Nicolò dell’Abbate

· Baptism of Christ by Luigi Anguissola

· Portrait of Francesco II d’Este by Andrea Baratta (nicknamed "the monkey")

· Allegory of Music; Ten Virtues by Jean Boulanger

· Thank you; Going home; Family; Under the shadow by Lawrence Carroll

· Religious effigies by Pierfrancesco Cittadini

· Market scene with fish and meat seller with Christ in Martha’s house attributed to Flemish school.

· The Dead Christ Mourned, attributed to Abraham Janssens

· Madonna of Fiorano by Ludovico Lana

· St John the Baptist by Camillo Procaccini

· Madonna of the Pearls by follower of Raphael

· Francesco I with his wife Maria Farnese and their children Alfonso and Isabella by Nicolas Régnier.

== Gallery ==
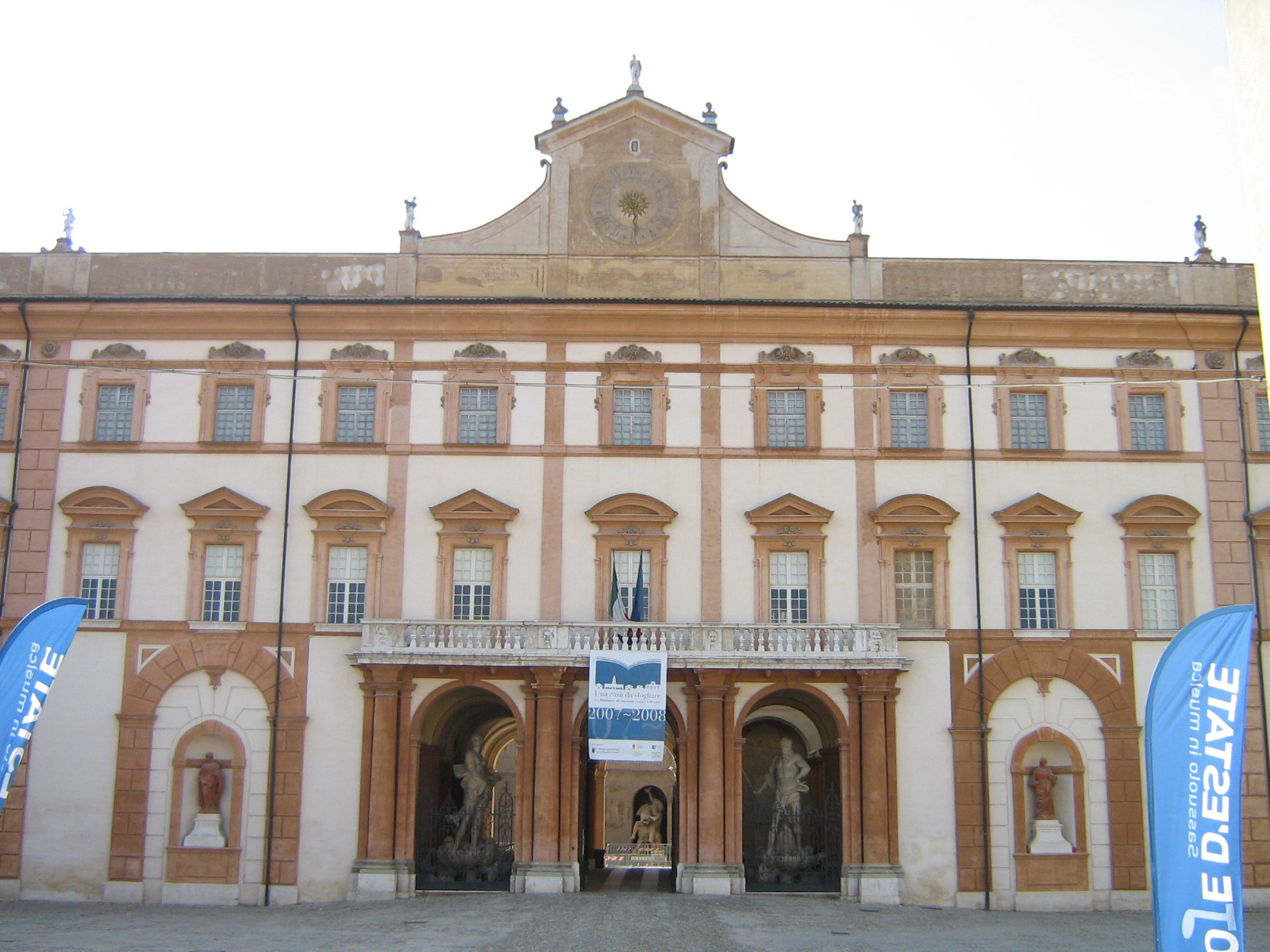
Front façade of the Ducal Palace of Sassuolo.

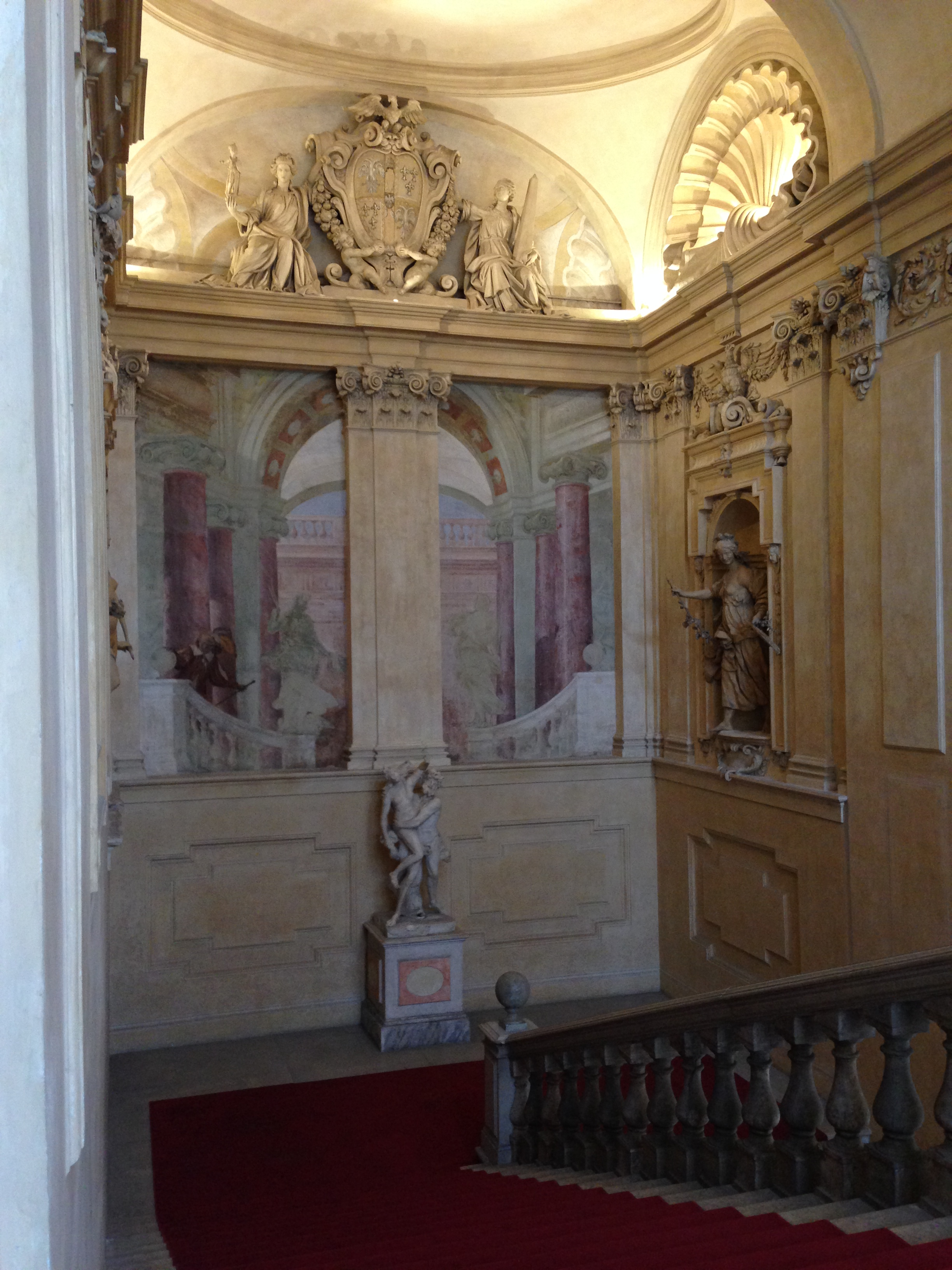
The Grand Staircase designed by Gaspare Vigarani, leading up to the gallery entrance.

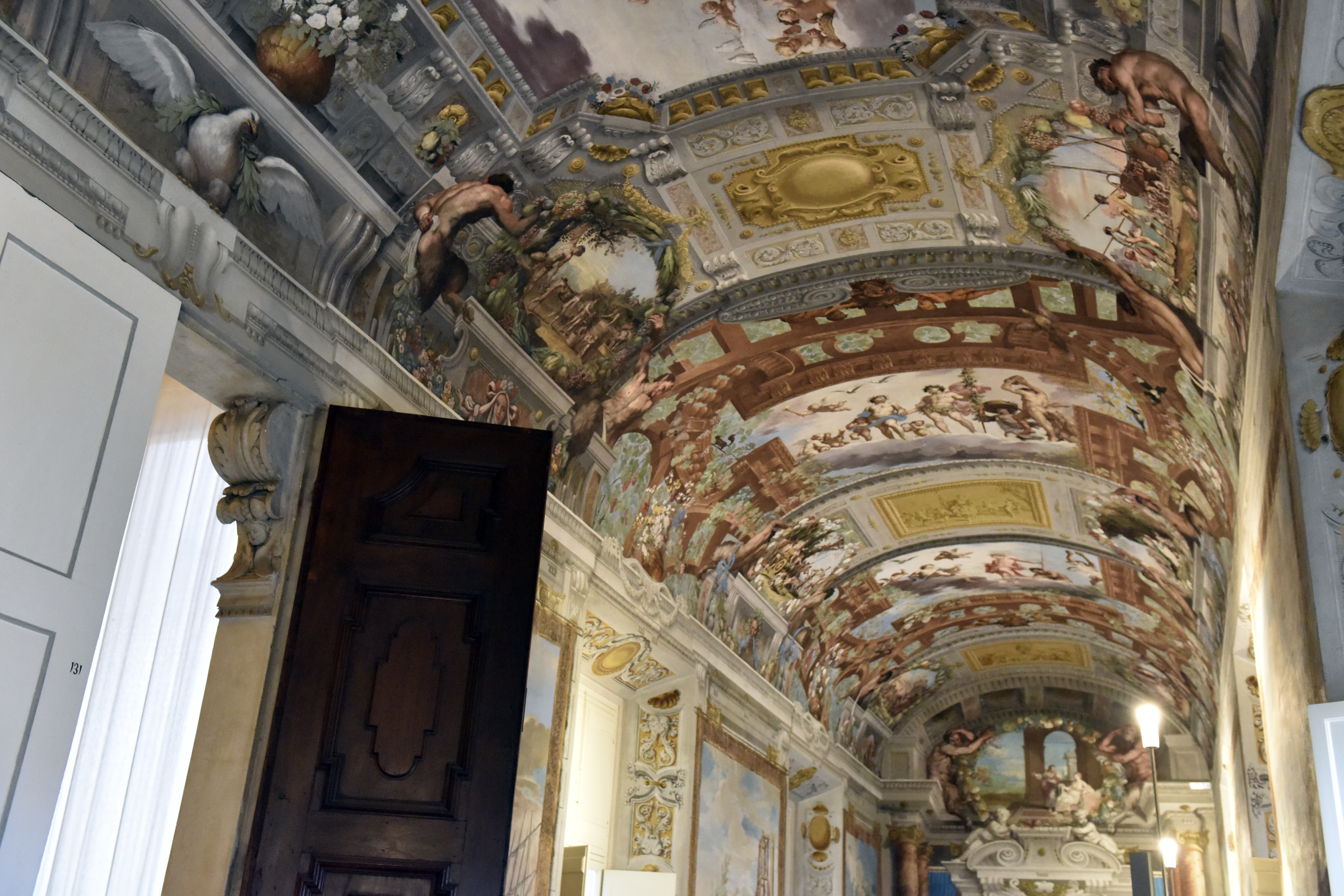
Angelo Michele Colonna and Agostino Mitellis' ceiling for the Great Hall of the Guards, executed from 1647 to 1648.

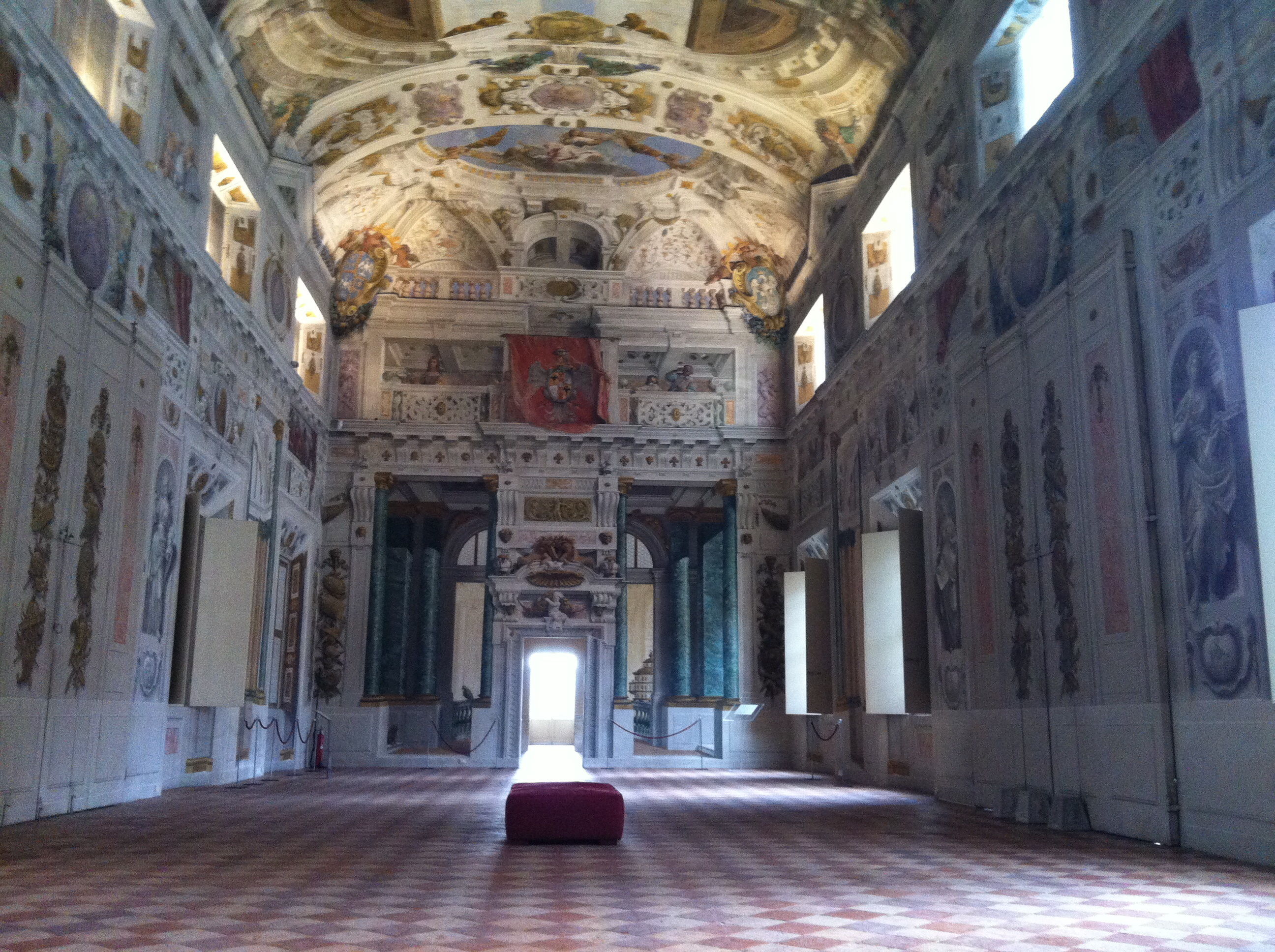
The Great Hall of the Guards: a lesson in Emiian Baroque painting with dramatically illusionistic frescoes covering every square inch of wall and ceiling.

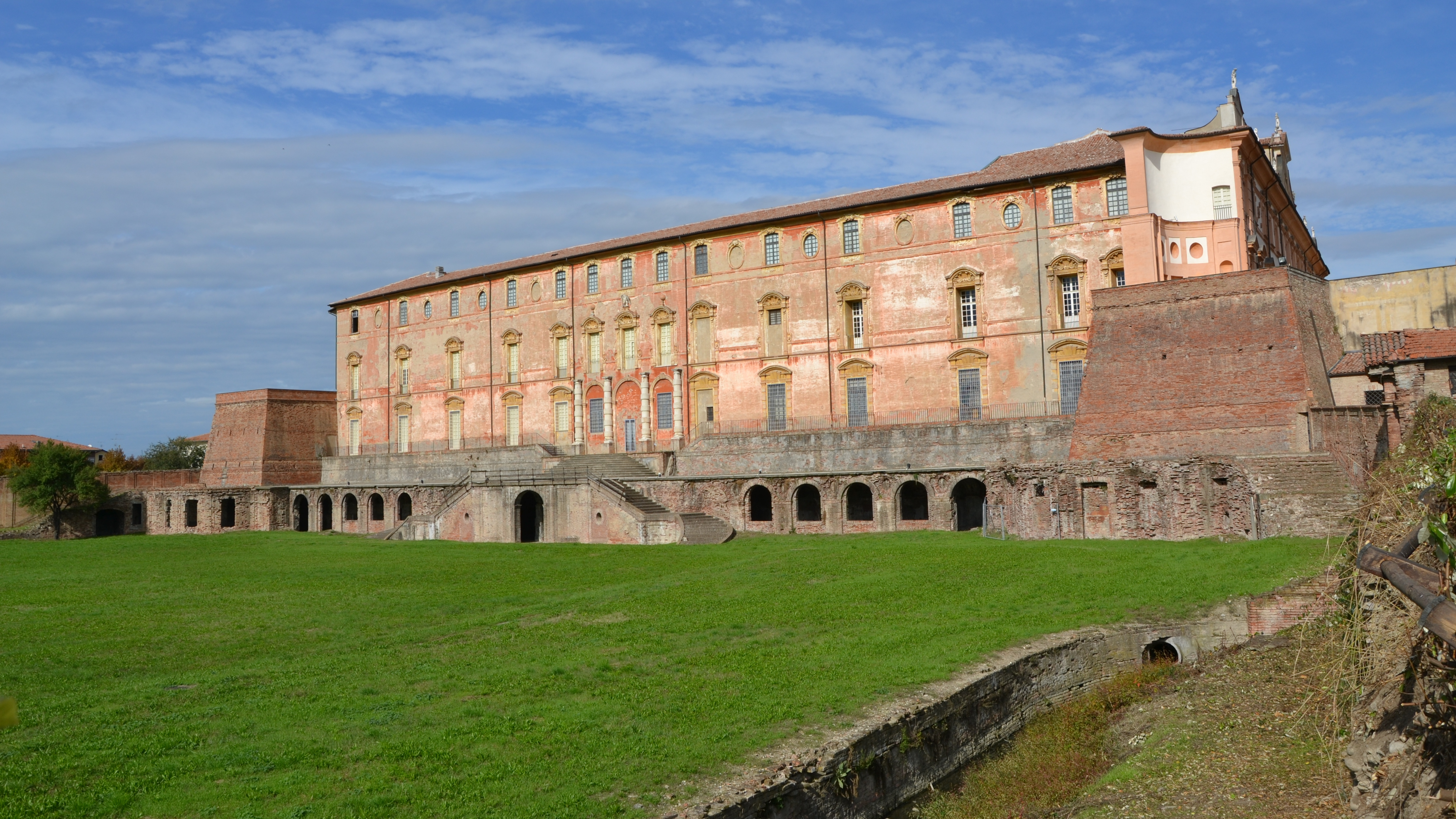
The South facade of the palace from the park.

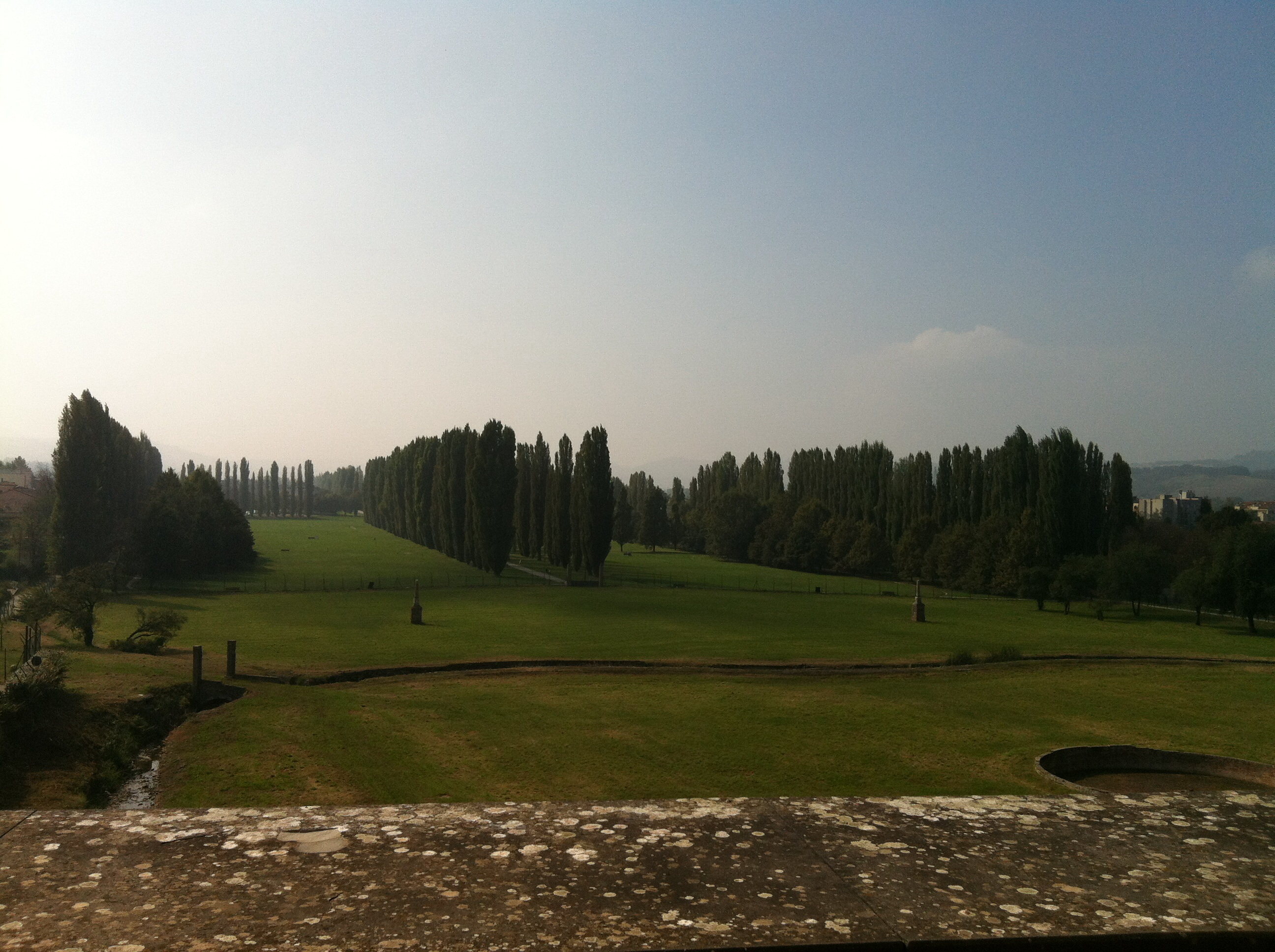
View of the park looking out onto the Secchia valley and across the ducal hunting grounds.

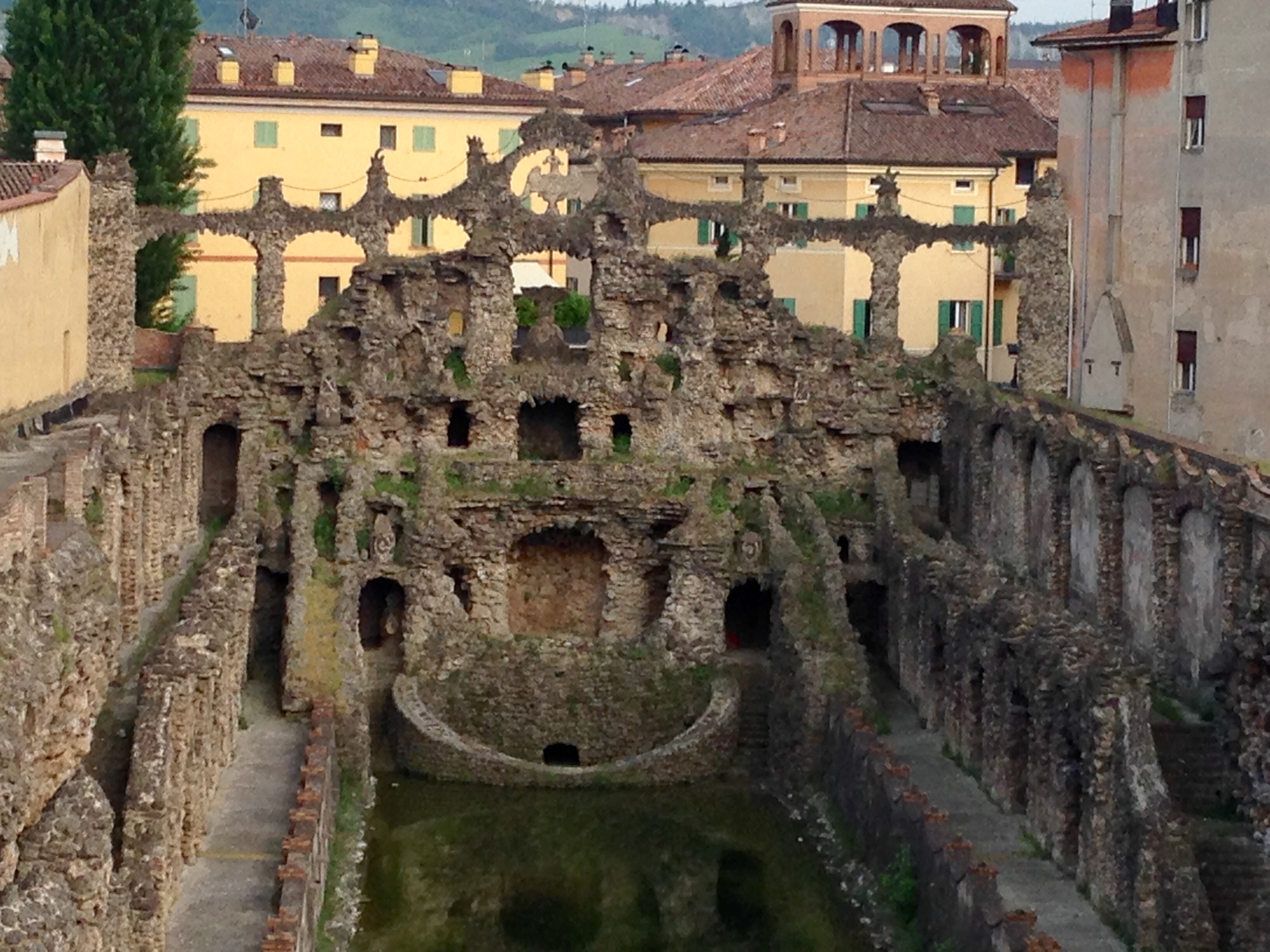
The mid-17th c. Peschiera was used for theatrical performances requiring the use of water, as well as for leisurely strolls around the Belvedere terrace.

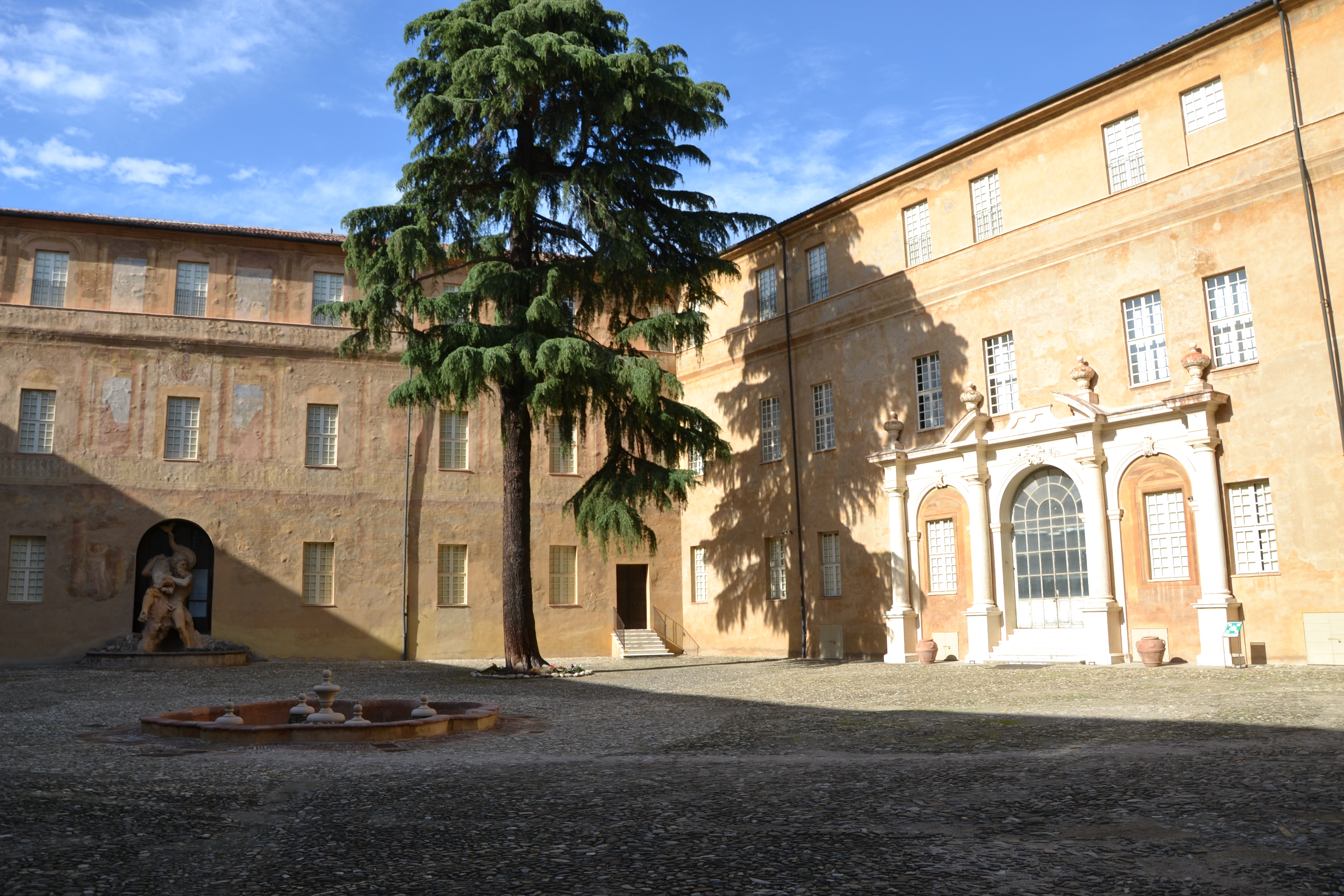
The inner courtyard of Honour with faded illusionistic perspective architecture and a Sea God with a Dolphin designed by Bernini

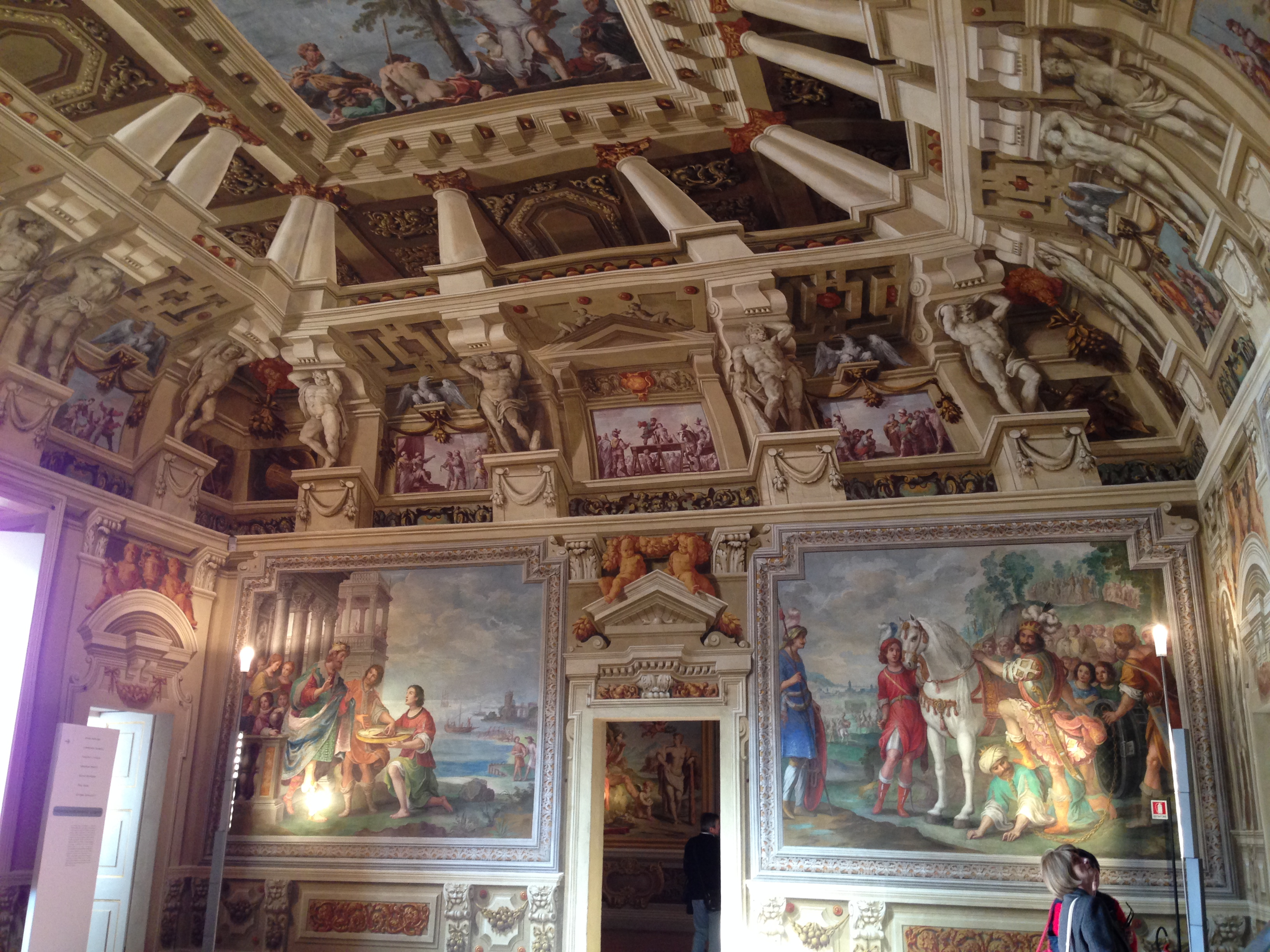
View of the Room of Fortune with Viviani's steep perspectival ceiling.

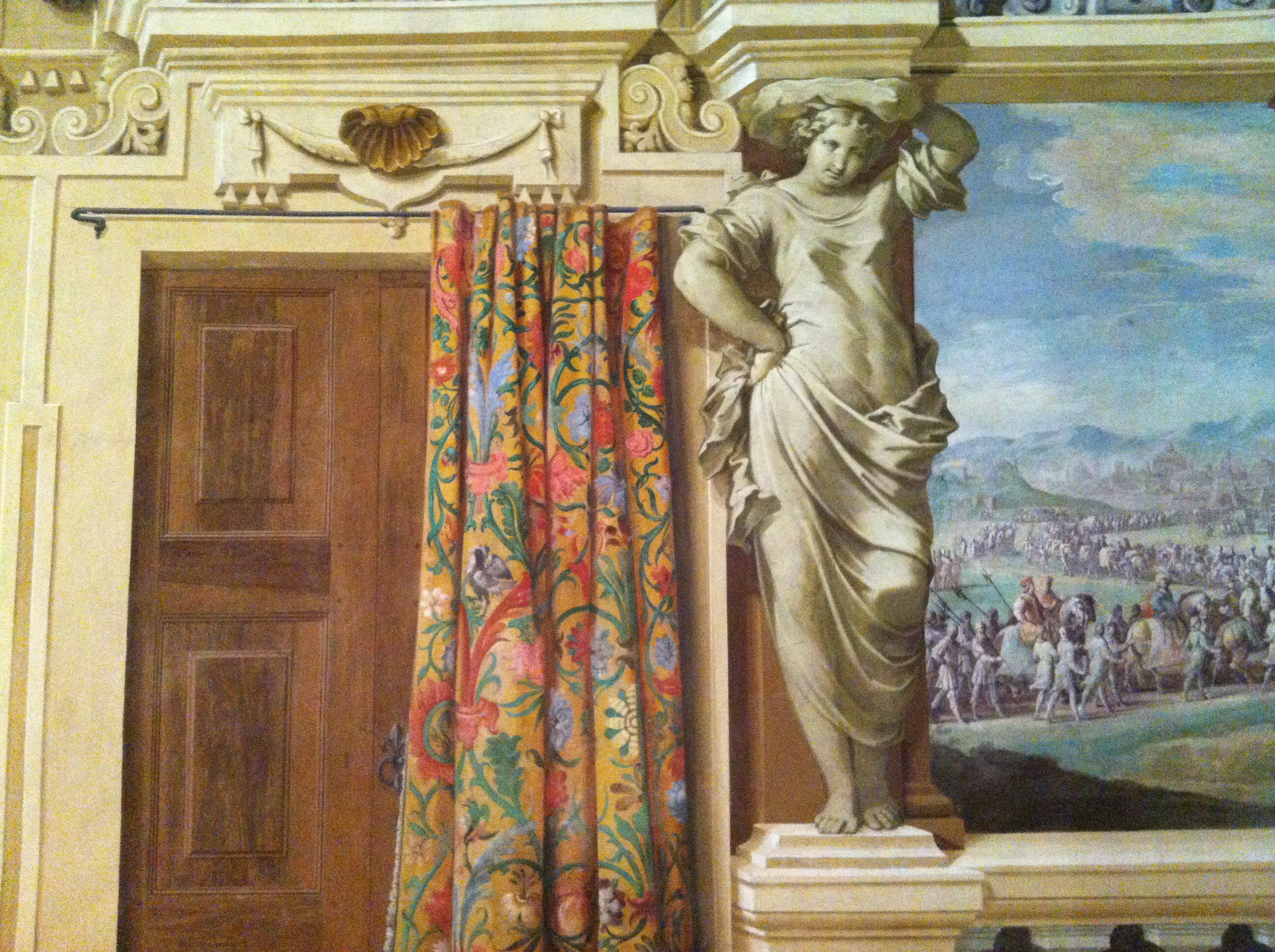
The Room of Estense Virtues with illusionistic frescos depicting caryatids by Boulanger. The room was intended to inspire sound government on behalf of the duke.

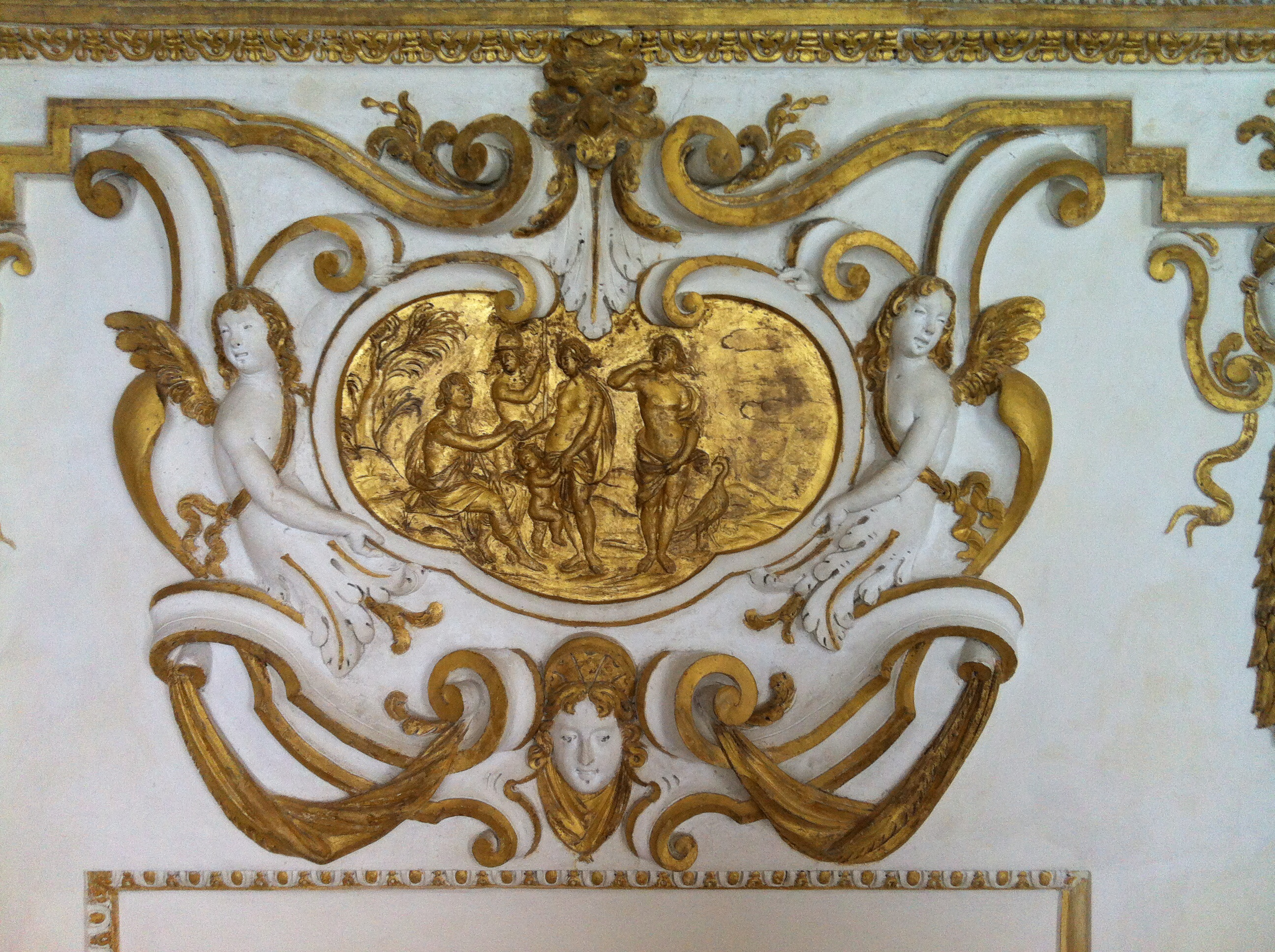
Detail of the Stuccoed Apartments' white and gold mouldings.

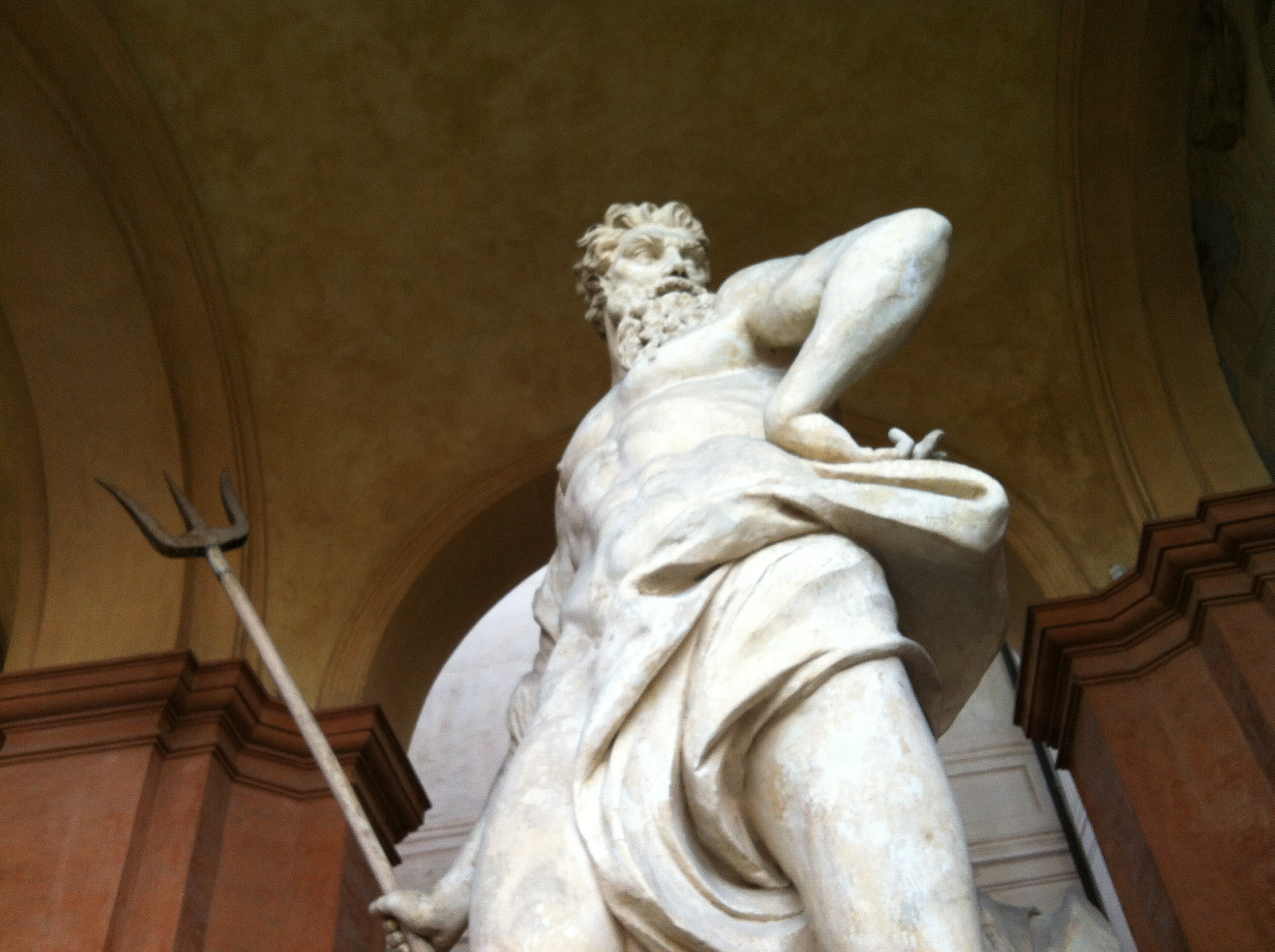
Gian Lorenzo Bernini's design for the atrium's fountain statue of Neptune, executed in 1650 by local stucco artists.

== See also ==
- List of Baroque residences
- Gallerie Estensi
- Galleria Estense
- Pinacoteca Nazionale in Ferrara
- Estense University Library
- Estense Lapidary Museum
