= Jean Boulanger =

Jean Boulanger may refer to:

- Jean Boulanger (painter) (1606–1660), French painter
- Jean Boulanger (engraver) (1607–1680), French line-engraver

== See also ==
- Jean-Claude Boulanger (born 1945), French prelate of the Catholic Church
