= Pinacoteca Nazionale in Ferrara =

Pinacoteca Nazionale di Ferrara
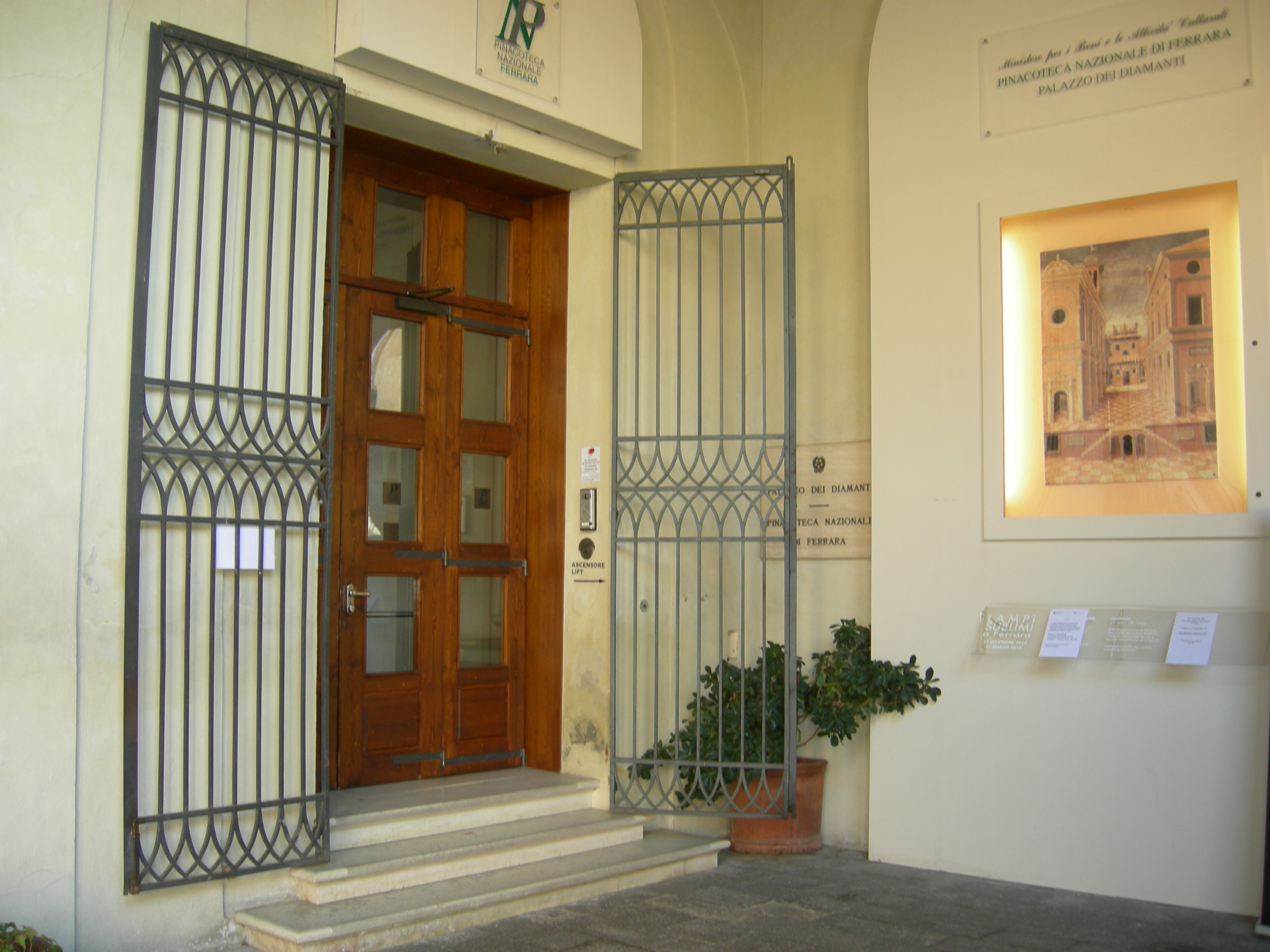
- Entrance to the National Art Gallery of Ferrara, in the Palazzo dei Diamanti
- Established: November 7, 1929; 96 years ago
- Location: Corso Ercole I d'Este, 21 Palazzo dei Diamanti, first floor, 44121 Ferrara, Italy
- Coordinates: 44°50′32.21″N 11°37′17.29″E
- Type: Art museum
- Director: Martina Bagnoli
- Website: www.gallerie-estensi.beniculturali.it/pinacoteca-nazionale/

The Pinacoteca Nazionale (transl. national picture gallery) is an art gallery in Ferrara, Emilia-Romagna, Italy. It is located on the piano nobile (or first floor) of the Palazzo dei Diamanti, a work of Renaissance architecture by Biagio Rossetti, commissioned by Leonello d’Este in 1447. Not to be confused with the Civic Museum on the lower floor, which has hosted temporary exhibitions of contemporary art since 1992, the Pinacoteca houses a collection of paintings by the Ferrarese School dating from the thirteenth to the eighteenth centuries. It was founded in 1836 by the Municipality of Ferrara after Napoleon's widespread dissolution of churches threatened the protection of important public artworks. The gallery is formed as much around notable northern Italian painters as it is around the exquisite interior decoration of the palace itself, together with remnants of frescoes from local churches and later acquisitions from the Sacrati Strozzi collection.

Since 2015 the Pinacoteca Nazionale has formed a part of the Gallerie Estensi, a network of museums sharing Ferrara's cultural heritage with that of Modena and Sassuolo.

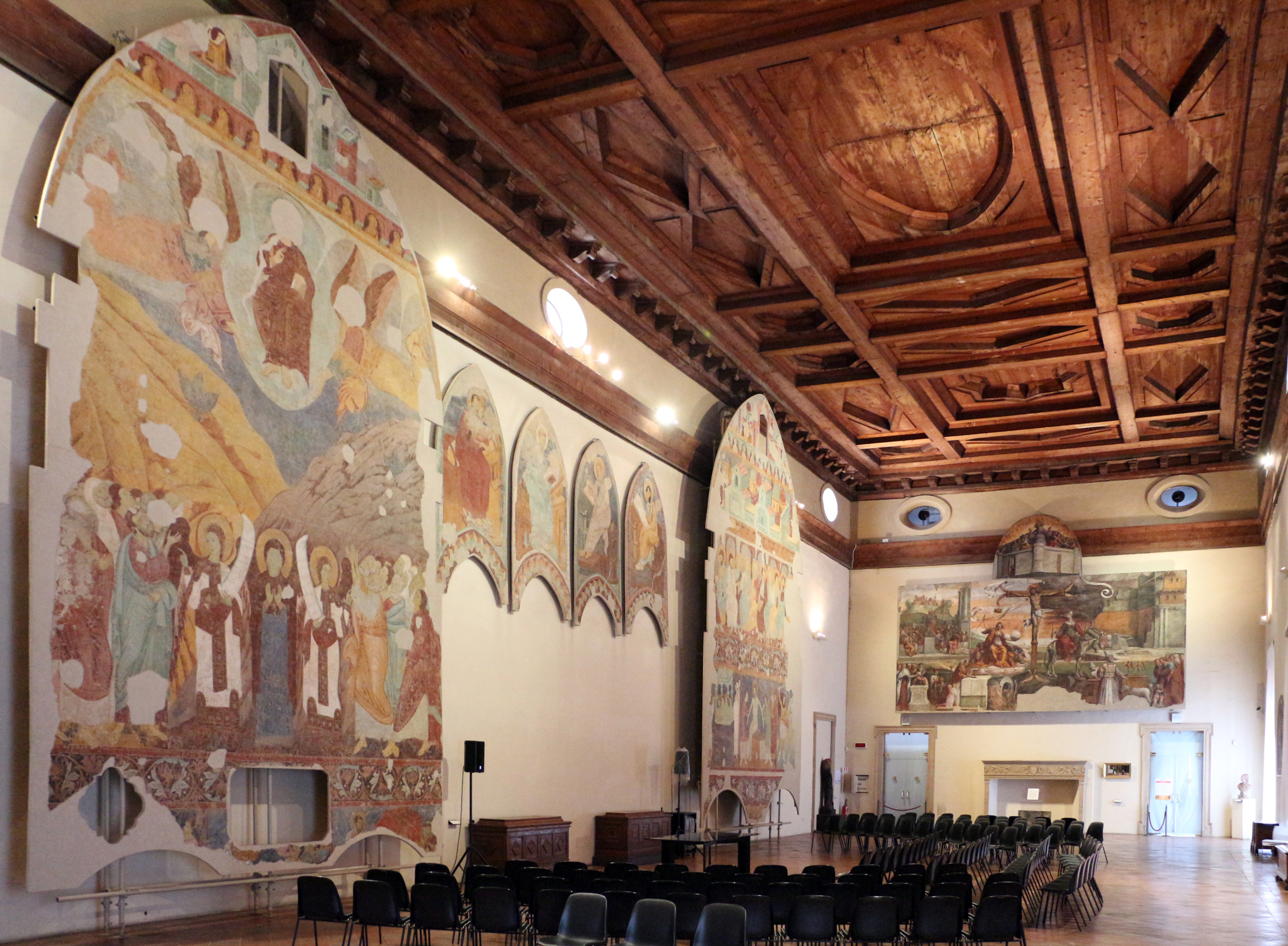
View of the Hall of Honour with frescoes from the mid-14th century

== Exhibits ==
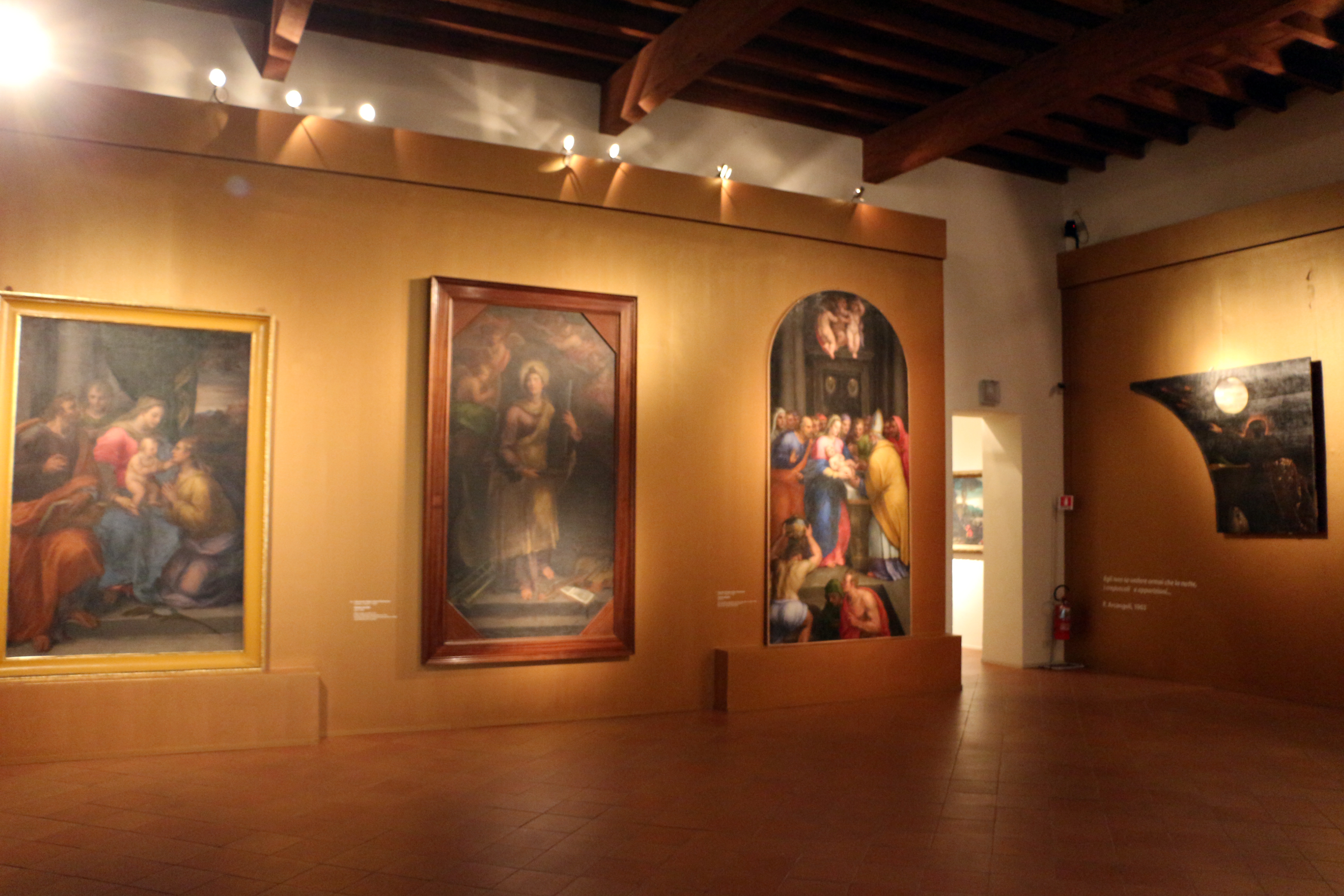
New room dedicated to the Ferrarese Mannerist painter Sebastiano Filippi (also known as Bastianino)

The Pinacoteca tells the history of the House of Este from that family's promotion as dukes of Ferrara in 1296 to its forced relocation to Modena in 1598. The gallery contains an impressive range of Italian works spanning the reigns of the dukes Leonello, Borso, Ercole I, Alfonso I and Alfonso II d'Este. Arranged chronologically, the exhibition begins with a room dedicated to late Gothic sculpture, fresco and panel painting, progressing through to the early Renaissance, the sixteenth century, Mannerism and lastly to the early seventeenth century, before Cesare I lost Ferrara to the Papal States. Highlights of the tour include the Hall of Honour, the sixteenth-century apartments of Virginia de' Medici (the roundels for these, early products of the Carracci workshop, can be seen in Modena's Galleria Estense) and a room dedicated to the step-by-step process of creating a fresco, panel or oil painting, complementing Cennino Cennini’s Il Libro dell’arte.

== Gallery ==
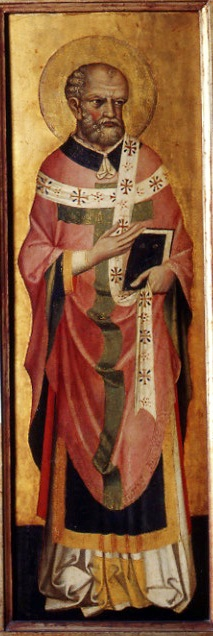
Attributed to Stefano Veneziano, Saint Apollinaire (14th century)

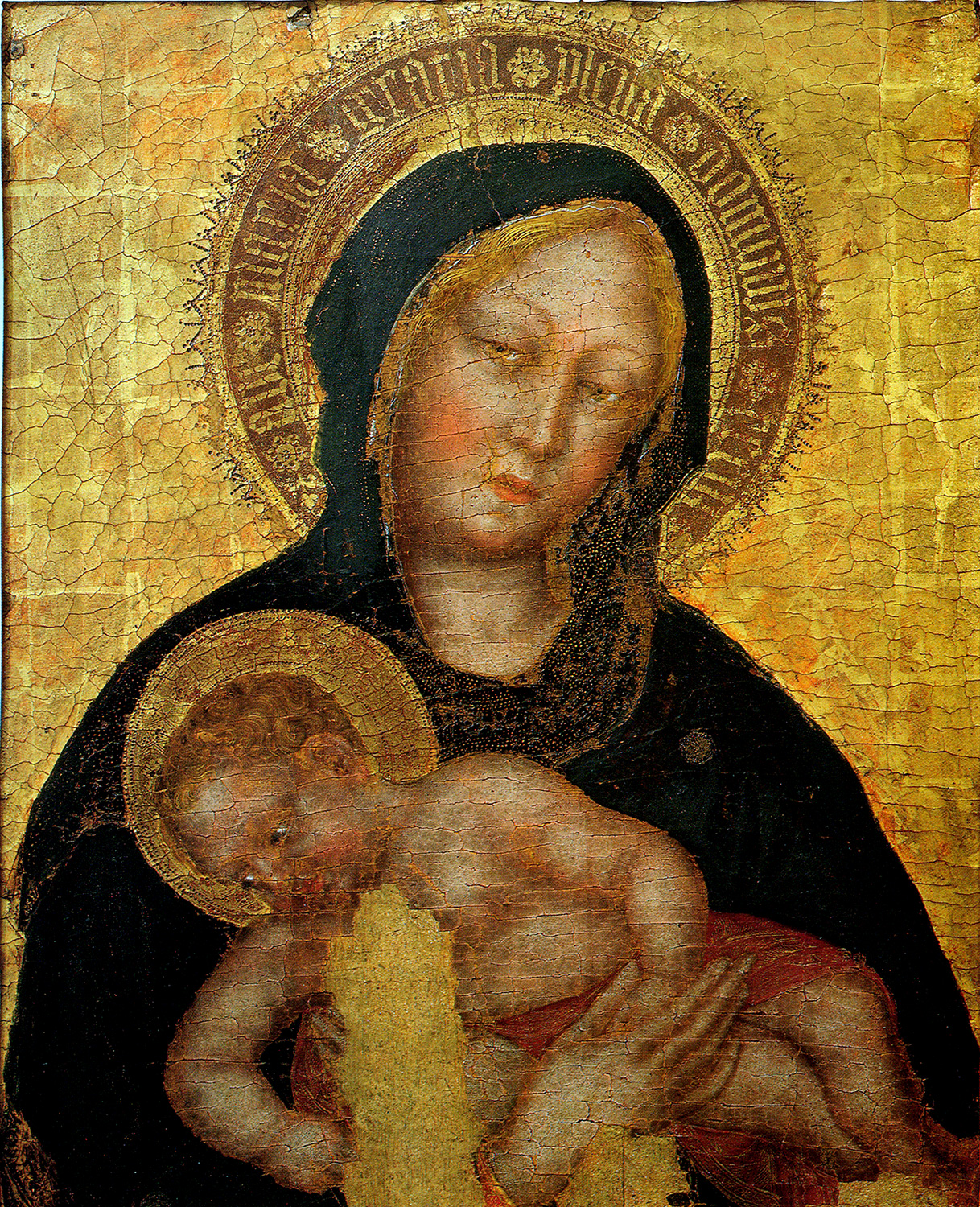
Gentile da Fabriano, Madonna and Child (c. 1410)

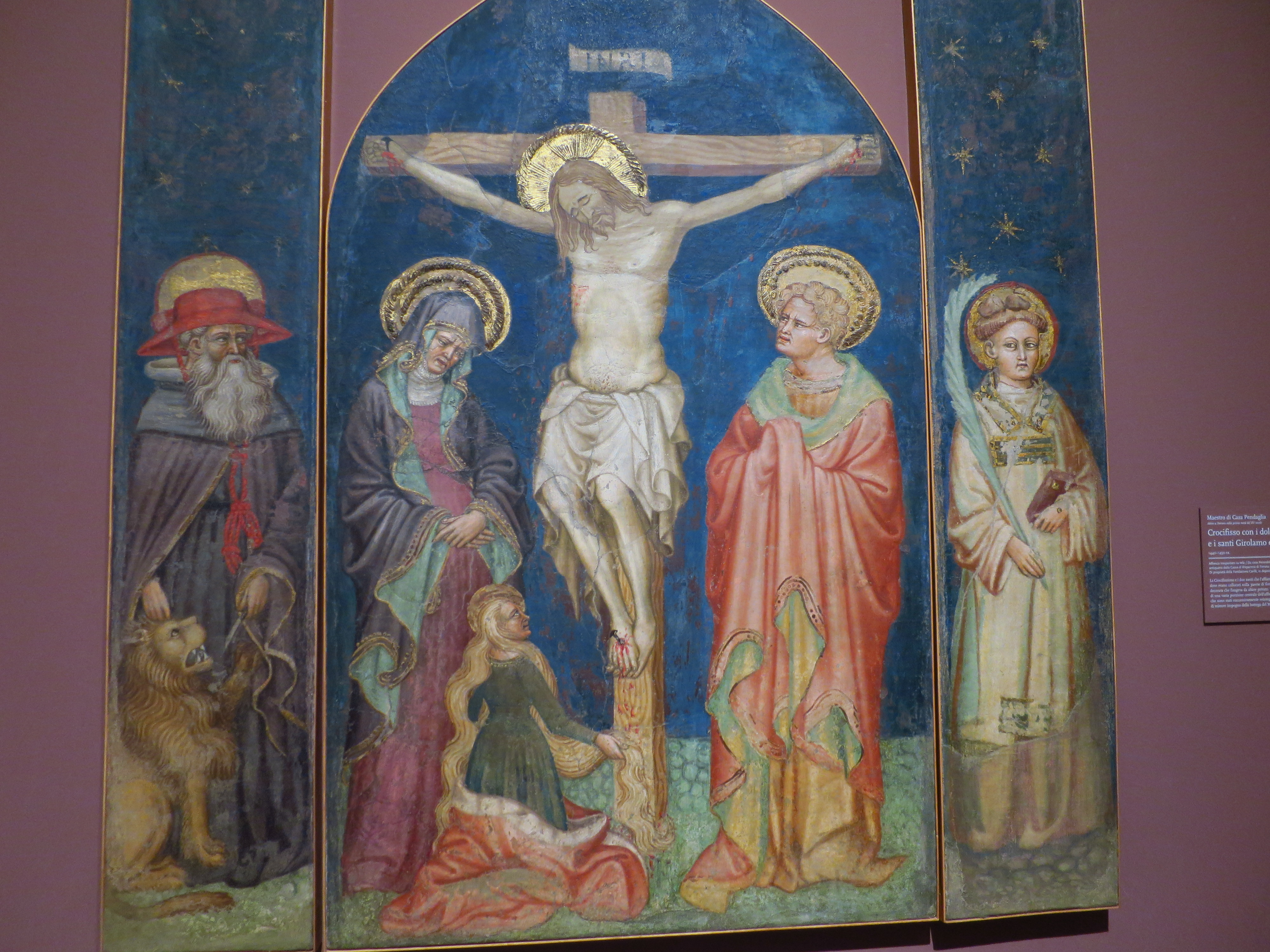
Master of Casa Pendaglia, The Crucifixion with Saints Jerome and Stephen (c. 1440–1450)

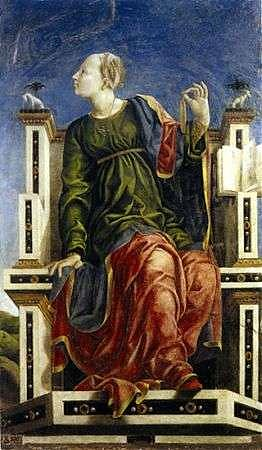
Angelo Maccagnino with Cosimo Tura, The Muse Urania (1447–1456)

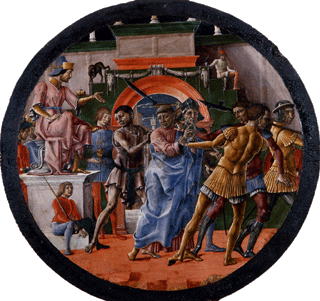
Cosimo Tura, Judgement of Saint Maurelio, Cosimo Tura (second half of the 15th century)

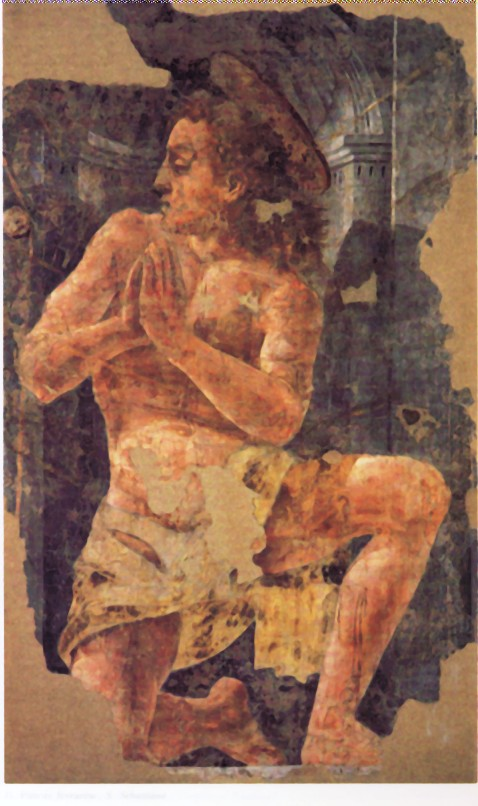
Ferrarese School, Saint Sebastian (second half of the 15th century)

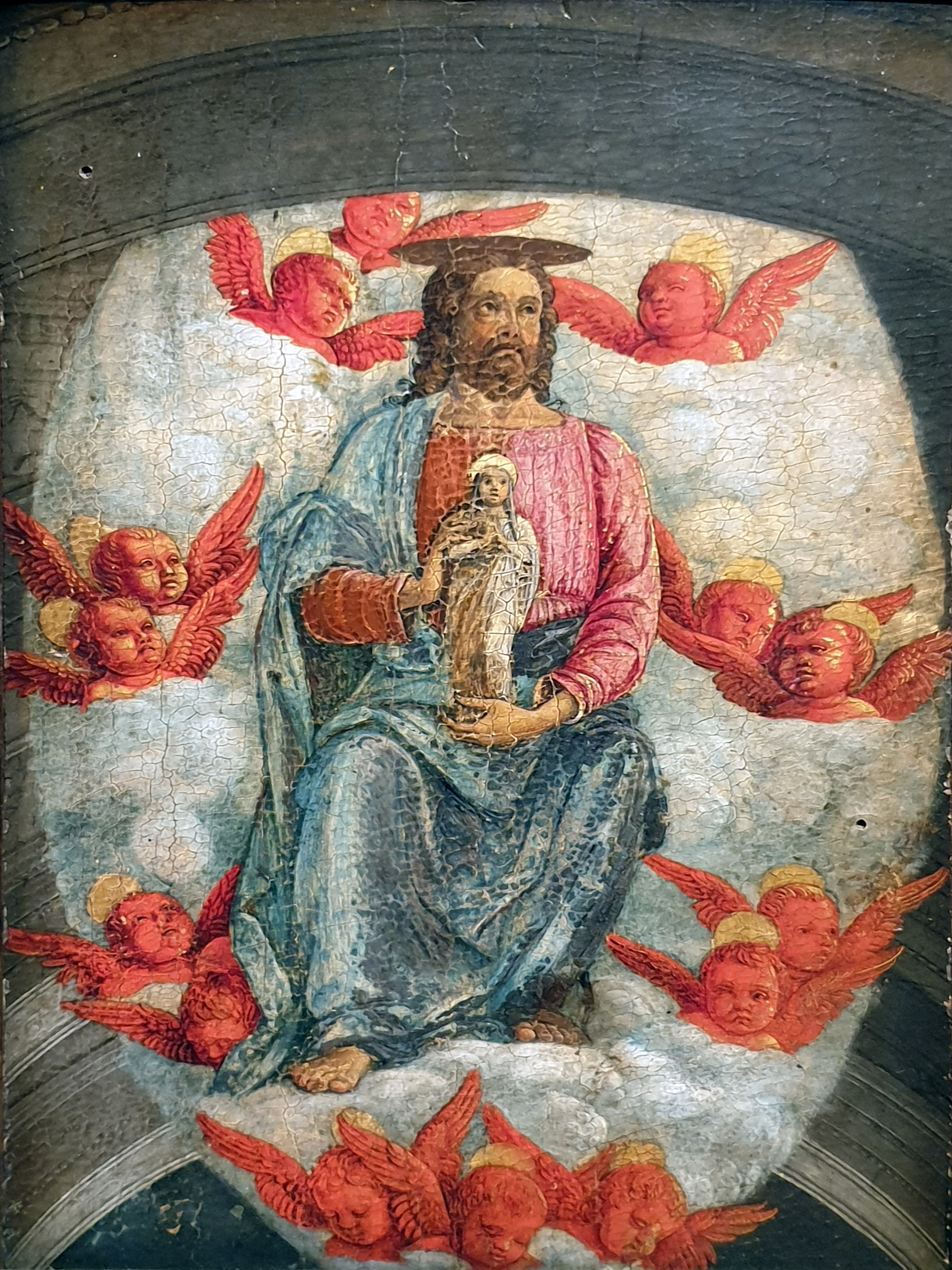
Andrea Mantegna, Christ with the Animula of the Virgin (1462)

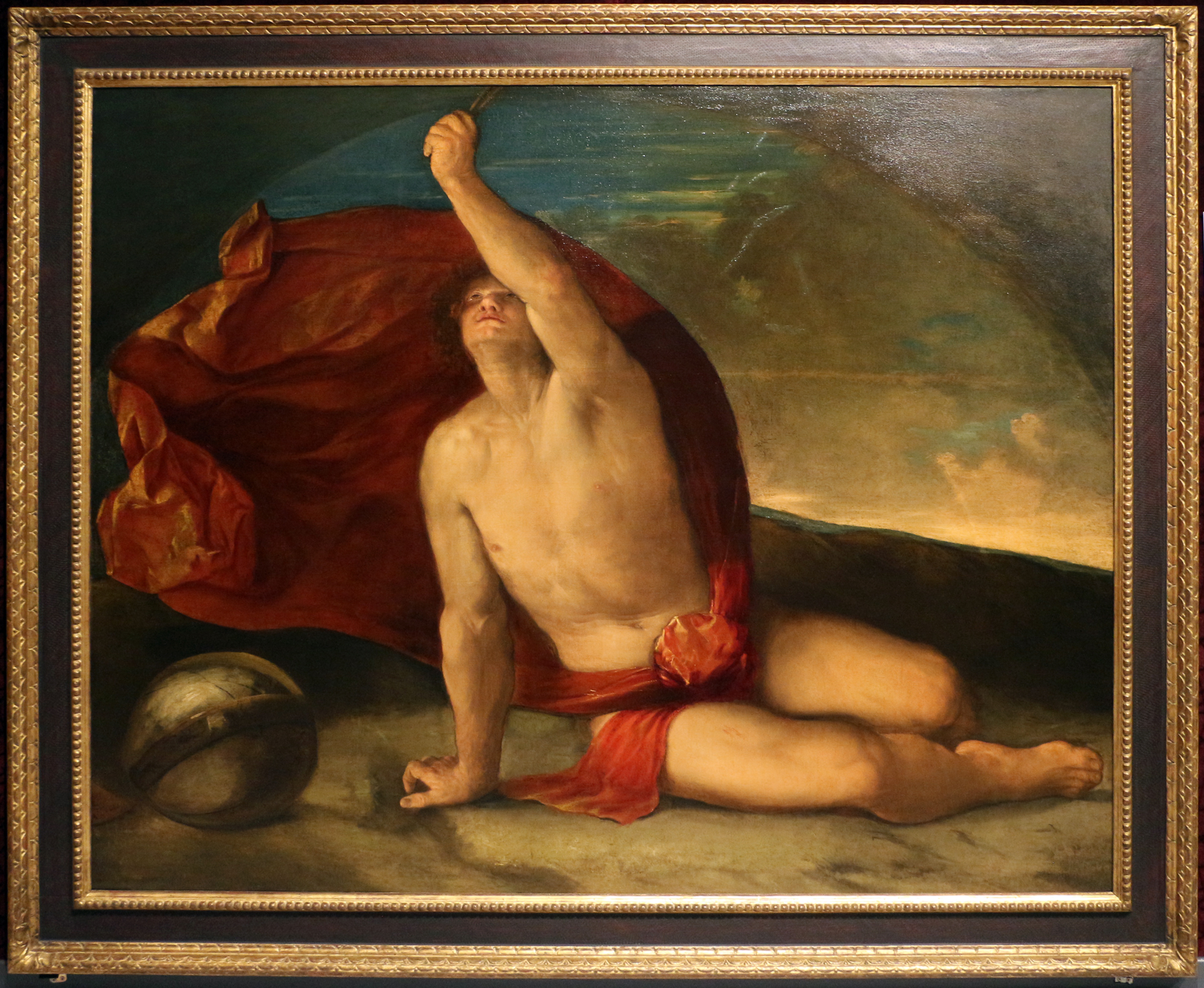
Dosso Dossi, Expert with Compass and Globe (c. 1486)

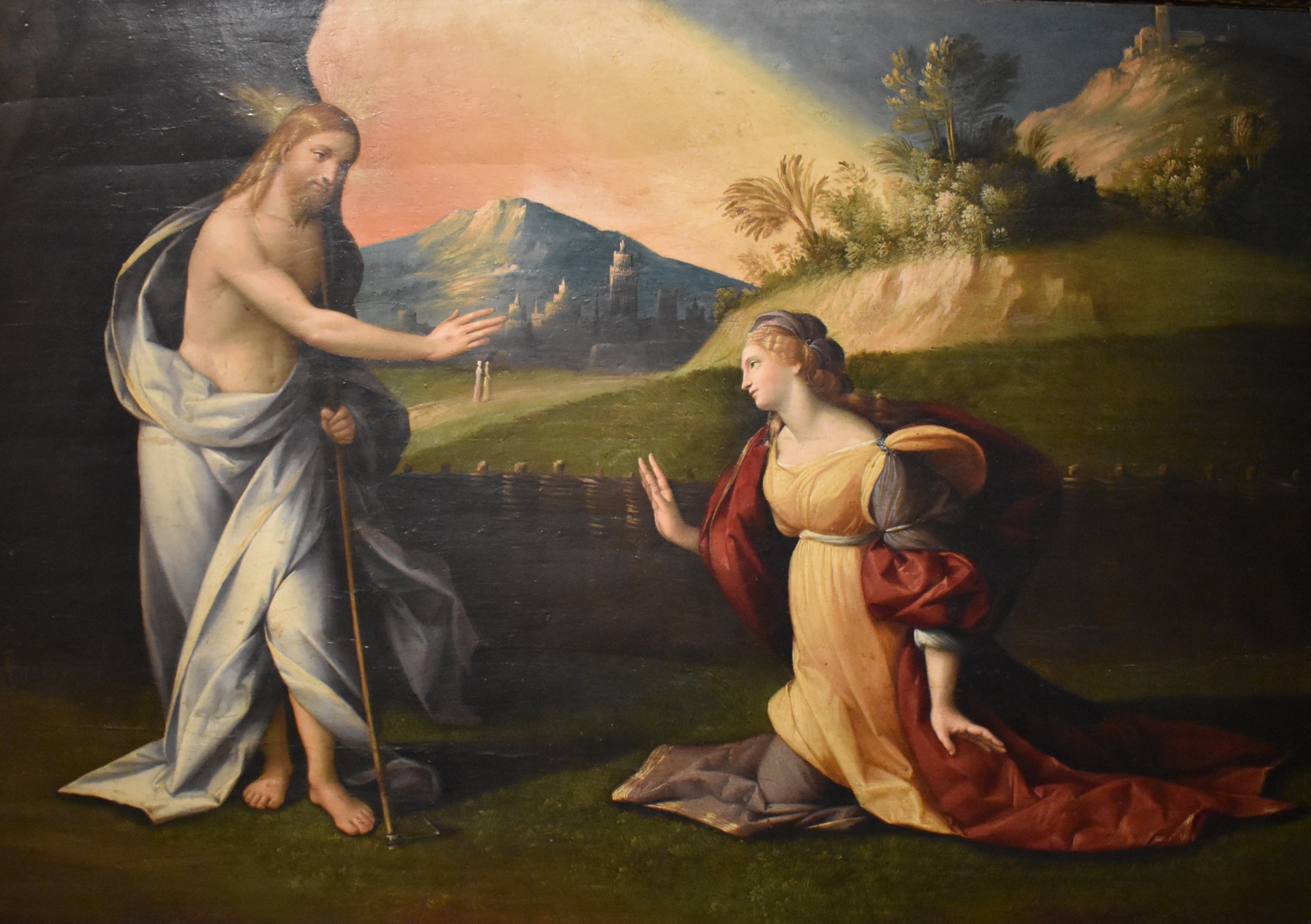
Il Garofalo, Noli Me Tangere (c. 1510)

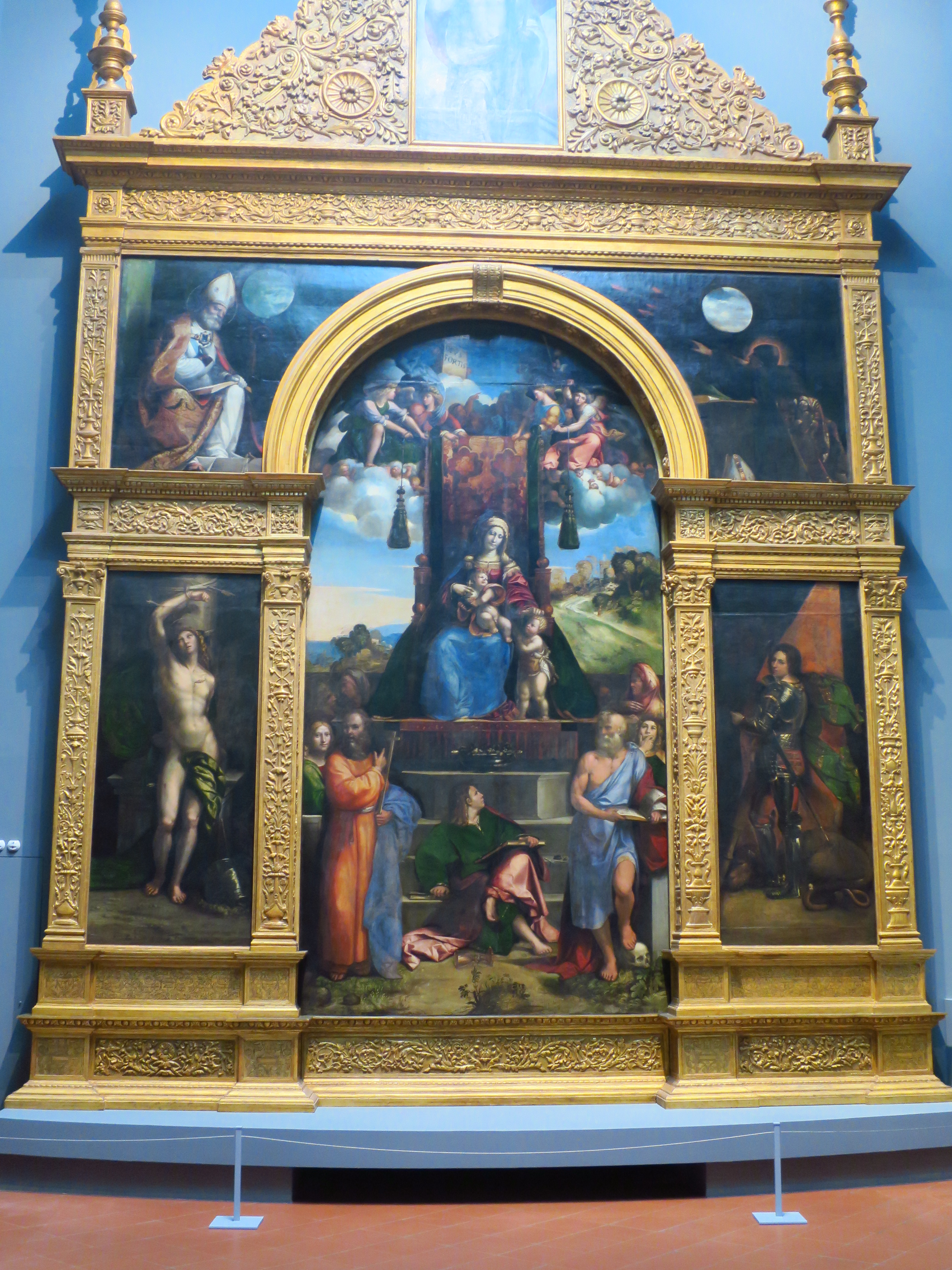
Dosso Dossi and Il Garofalo, Virgin Enthroned with Saints (c. 1530)

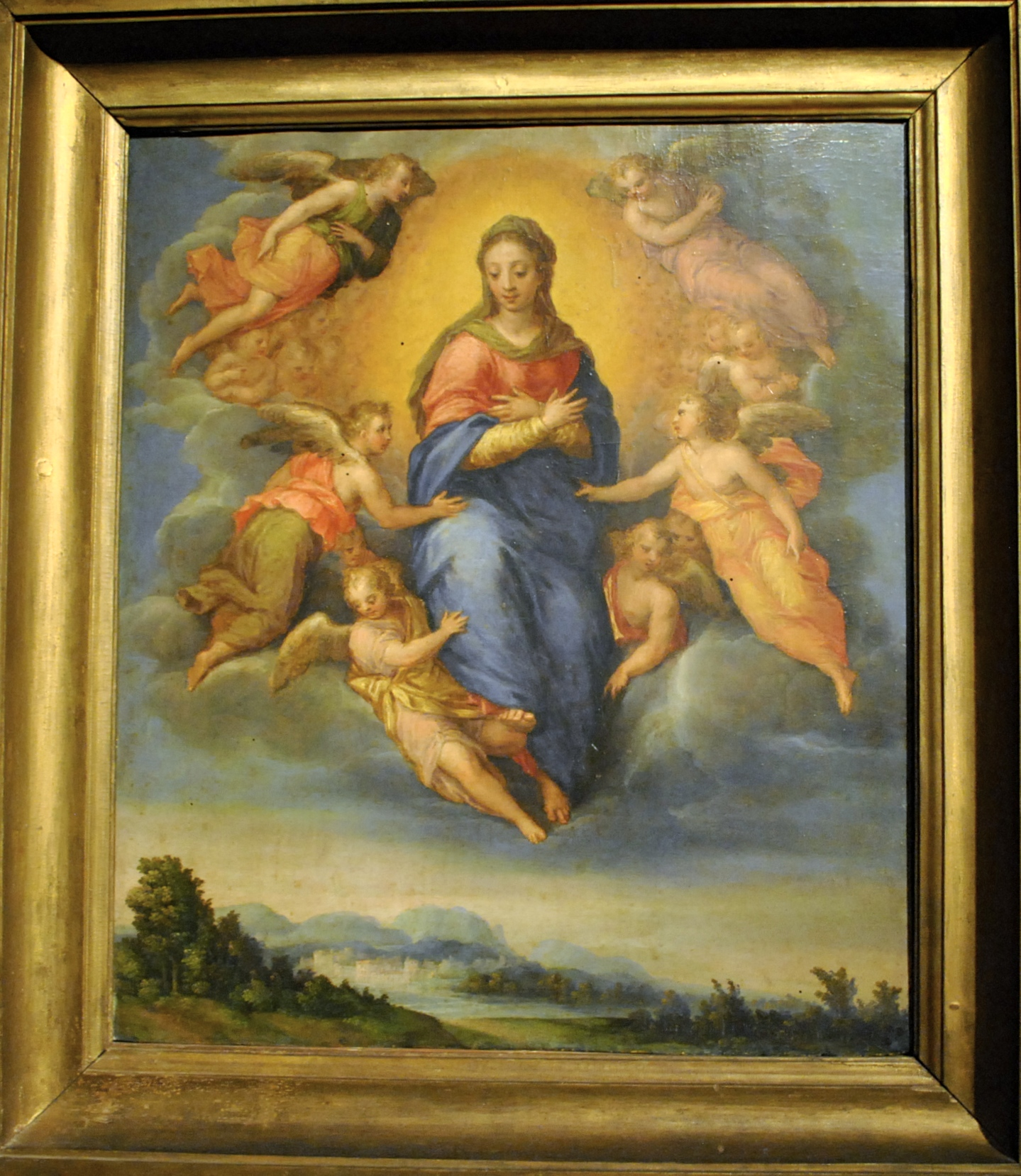
Sebastiano Filippi (Bastianino), The Assumption of the Virgin (second half of the 16th century)

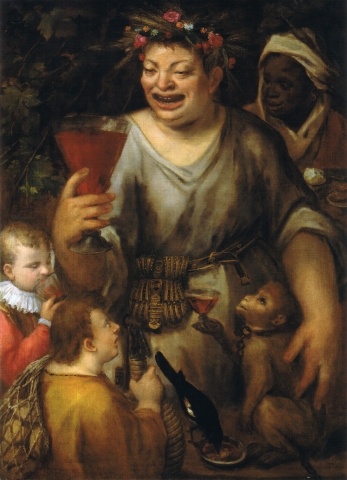
Sebastiano Filippi, Allegory with Bacchus

== Collection ==
- Deposition from the Cross by Bastarolo (Giuseppe Mazzuoli)
- Allegory with Bacchus; The Virgin and Child, St. Lucy and St. Matthew; Circumcision by Bastianino
- Adoration of the Magi predella by Jacopo and Giovanni Bellini
- Wedding at Cana; Guardian Angel by Carlo Bononi
- Death of the Virgin by Vittore Carpaccio
- The Dream of the Virgin by Simone dei Crocifissi
- Two works from a liberal arts cycle by Dosso Dossi
- Vision of St. John the Evangelist by Battista Dossi
- Madonna and Child by Gentile de Fabriano
- Annunciation by Vicino da Ferrara
- St. John the Baptist by the Master of Figline
- Madonna of the Clouds; Massacre of the Innocents by Il Garofalo
- Adoration of the Shepherds by Gaetano Gandolfi
- Christ on the Cross attributed to Guariento
- The Martyrdom of St. Maurilius by Guercino
- Head of St John the Baptist by Giovanni Francesco Maineri
- Christ with the Animula of the Virgin by Andrea Mantegna
- Nativity with St. Bernard and St. Alberic by Ludovico Mazzolino
- Flight to Egypt; Agony in the Garden; Deposition by Ortolano (Giovan Battista Benvenuti)
- St. Louis of Toulouse; Saint Bernardine of Siena by Michele Pannonio
- St. Sebastian, St. Joseph, St. Job and Worshippers from the Mori family; Death of the Virgin by Nicolò Pisano
- Italian Capriccio with River Haven by Hubert Robert
- St. Petronius by Ercole de' Roberti
- Noli me tangere; Wedding at Cana by Scarsellino
- The Triumph of Saint Augustine fresco attributed to Serafino de' Serafini
- The Trial and Martyrdom of St. Maurelius by Cosmè Tura
- Virgin and Child by Master of the Wide Eyes

The Costabili Polyptych by Il Garofalo and Dosso Dossi

The Muses Erato and Urania from Leonello d’Este's Studiolo of Belfiore

Frescoes from the 14th and early 15th century such as Scenes from the life of St. John the Evangelist and Virtues and Vices.

== See also ==
- List of national galleries

== Bibliography ==
- Giovanni Fei, Municipal Art Gallery of Ferrara: catalogue of the paintings that make up the Municipal Art Gallery of Ferrara – expanded with historical and bibliographical information for Giovanni Fei, Artist and Public Pinacotecario, Ferrara, typography of the Eridano, 1878, non-existent ISBN.
- Jadranka Bettini (ed.) La Pinacoteca Nazionale di Ferrara. General catalogue, Bologna, Nuova Alfa editorial, 1992, ISBN 88-7779-292-2.
- Sonia Cavicchioli, In the centuries of magnificence. Clients and interior decoration in Emilia in the Sixteenth and Seventeenth centuries. Argelato, Bologna, Minerva, 2008, pp. 105–125, ISBN 978-88-7381-212-8.
- Marcello Toffanello, Ferrara, The Renaissance City and the Po delta, Rome, Instituto Poligrafico and Zecca dello Stato, 2005, pp. 102–106, ISBN 88-240-1113-6. ISBN 9788824011136.

== Related entries ==
- Estense Gallery
- Estense University library
- Estense Lapidary Museum
- Ducal Palace of Sassuolo
- Gallerie Estensi

== Other projects ==
- Media related to Pinacoteca Nazionale in Ferrara at Wikimedia Commons
