= Antonio Maria Pacchioni =

Italian composer

Antonio Maria Pacchioni (5 July 1654 - 15 July 1738) was an Italian Baroque composer, known for his polyphonic church music.

== Biography ==
The son Bartolomeo Pacchioni and Lucia Pacchioni (nee Bartolomasi), Antonio Maria Pacchioni was baptized in Modena on 5 July 1654. He lived his entire life in Modena. His music teachers in that city included Giovanni Maria Bononcini (music composition and violin), Agostino Bendinelli (counterpoint), and Marzio Erculeo (singing). He made unsuccessful early attempts at having a career as a singer and organist despite having the backing of Cesare d'Este, Duke of Modena.

In 1677, Pacchioni received holy orders, and entered the priesthood in service at the San Carlo, Modena (SCM). He became a member of the mensa comune (an organization of musician priests) at the SCM on 24 May 1679, and subsequently taught at the music college run by that organization. Among his pupils was the violinist-composer Tomaso Antonio Vitali.

Pacchioni composed some of the earliest oratorios heard publicly in Modena. He wrote three oratorios between 1677 and 1682 which were performed at the Oratorio di San Carlo Rotondo. He succeeded Giuseppe Colombi as maestro di cappella of the Modena Cathedral on 28 September 1694, and remained in that post until his death, nearly 44 years later. His tenure was marked by internal conflicts which almost led to his dismissal in 1720 and again in 1728, and his job was only saved both times by the intervention of Duke Rinaldo d'Este.

While working for the church, Pacchioni was simultaneously in service to Duke Rinaldo at the court of Modena. He was appointed vicemaestro di cappella on 1 December 1699; serving under the maestro di cappella Antonio Gianettini. He succeeded Gianettini in the higher office on 15 January 1722, and remained in that position until his death in Modena on July 15, 1738.

Of Pacchioni's surviving compositions, two were on sacred subjects while a third (1682) concerned the quasi-legendary countess Matilda of Tuscany. His four-voice a cappella motets In monte Oliveti and Velum templi have been recorded.
