= Sigismondo Caula =

Italian painter (1637–1724)

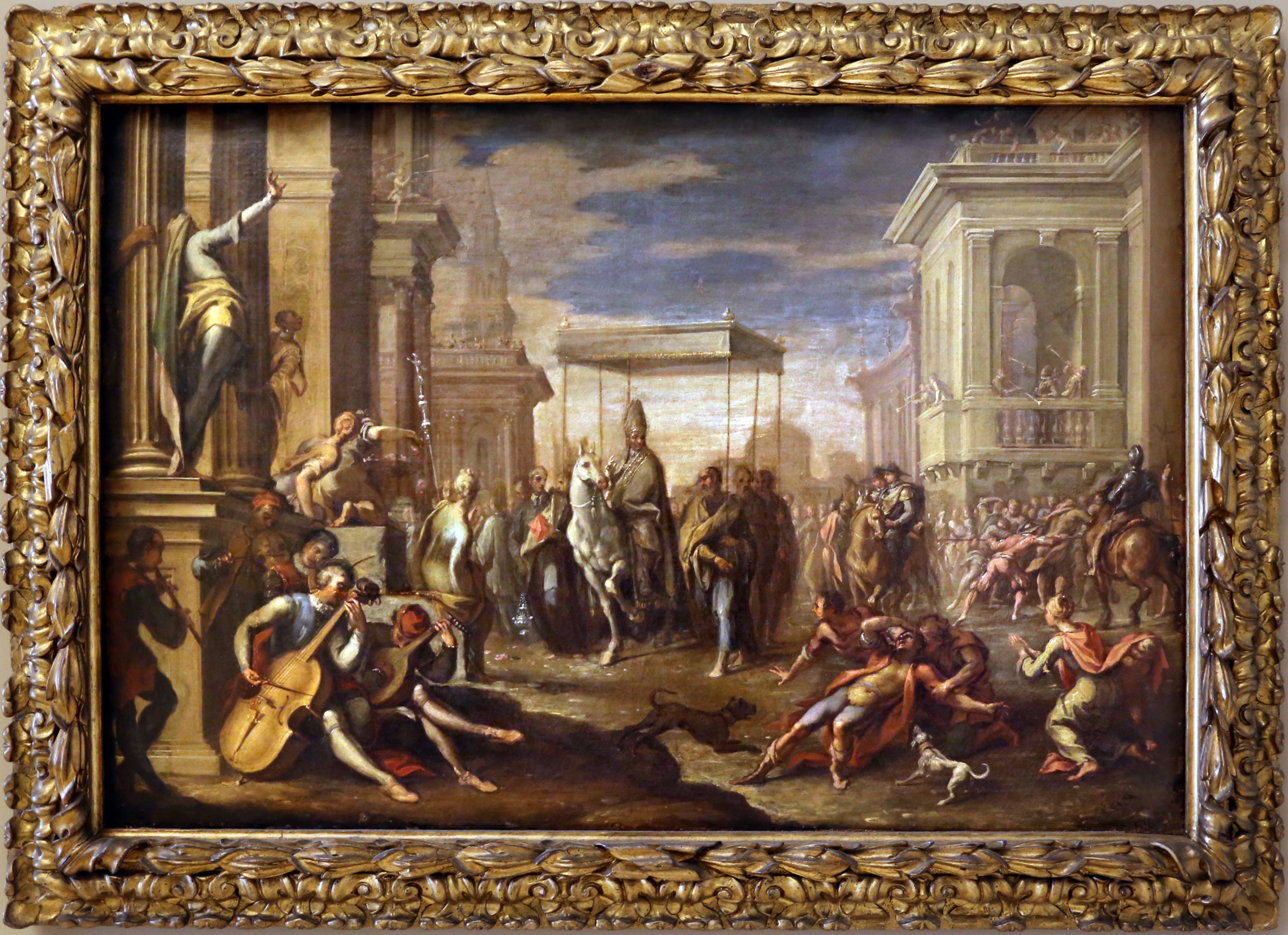
Miracle of sant'Ambrogio, Galleria Estense

Sigismondo Caula (1637–1724) was an Italian painter of the Baroque style.

Caula was born in Modena, where he was the pupil of Jean Boulanger, but finished his studies at Venice, from the works of Titian and Tintoretto. Besides his altar-pieces, he painted cabinet pictures for private collections. His best production was his large picture of St Charles Borromeo assisting the plague-stricken people of Modena, which was painted, with great vigor and expression, for the church of San Carlo, Modena, but now at the Este Gallery at Modena. That gallery also displays a St Ambrose by Caula. In the latter portion of his life he became more languid in his coloring and execution. He painted as late as 1694.
