= Giovanni Lazzoni =

Italian sculptor

Giovanni Lazzoni (1618 – after 1687) was an Italian sculptor of the Baroque period.

He was born in Massa di Carrara, but worked for years in Rome, the Duchy of Modena, and for the Republic of Lucca. He completed the statues of Athena and Mercury on the facade of the Ducal Palace of Modena. He also worked in the Ducal Palace of Sassuolo. Among his masterworks is a marble relief for San Giovanni Laterano in Rome depicting the Resurrection of Christ. Two of his sons, Andrea and Tomaso, were also artists.
