= Tommaso Costa =

Italian painter

- Born: 1634
- Died: 1690 (aged 55–56)
- Occupation: Painter
- Known for: Cupola of the church of San Vicenzo, Modena; Affreschi in the pilgrimage church of Fiorano Modenese

Tommaso Costa (1634–1690) was an Italian painter of the Baroque period. He was born in Sassuolo, and died in Reggio Emilia. He was the pupil of the painter Jean Boulanger at Modena. He painted the cupola of the church of San Vicenzo in Modena and affreschi in the pilgrimage church of Fiorano Modenese, south of Modena.
