= Pierfrancesco Cittadini =

Italian painter (1616–1681)

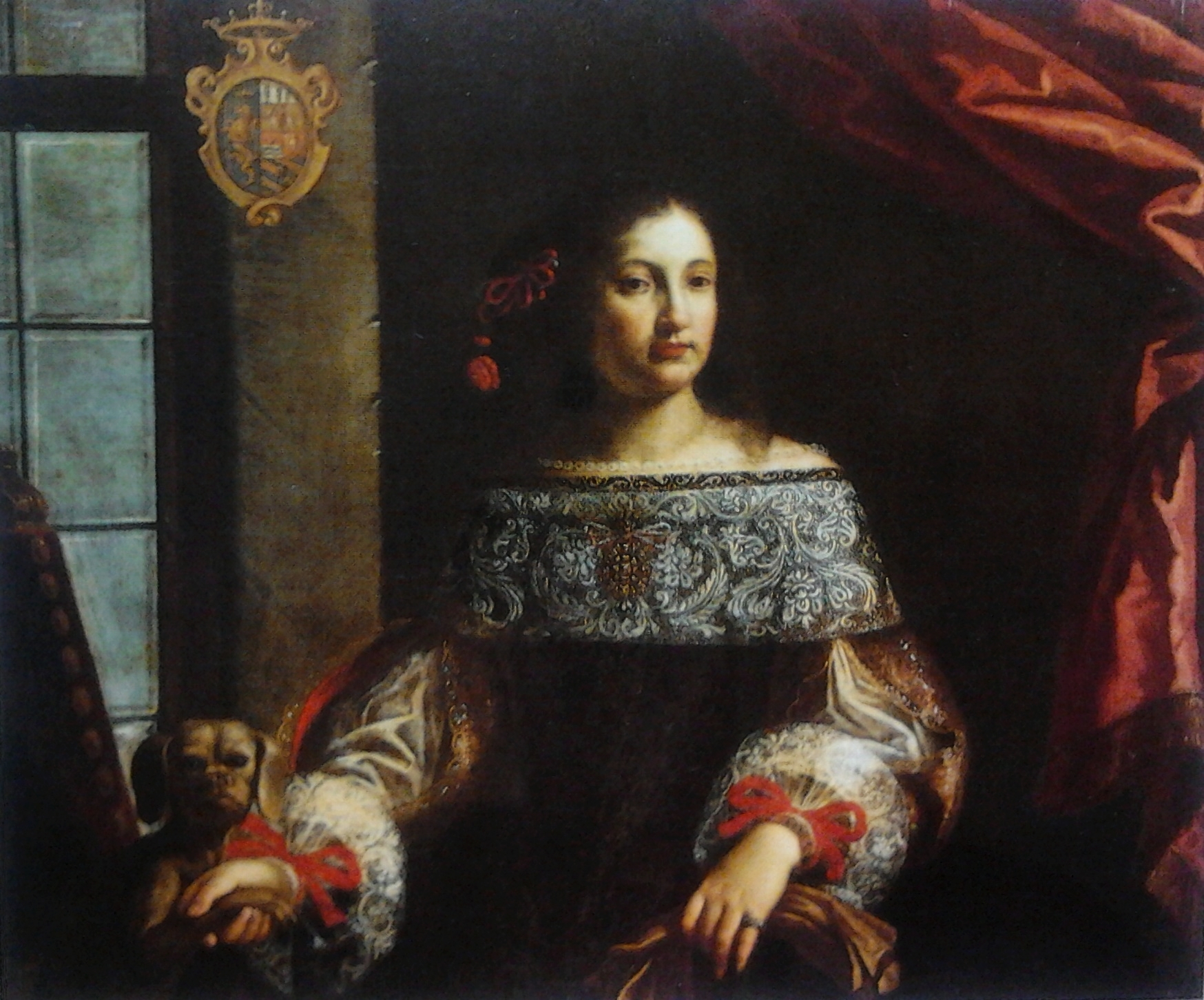
Portrait of Countess Simonetta Cavazzi della Somaglia (1660s) by Pierfrancesco Cittadini, Porczyński Gallery in Warsaw

Pierfrancesco Cittadini (1616–1681) was an Italian painter of the Baroque period, active mainly in Bologna and noted for his portraits and lush still lifes.

== Biography ==
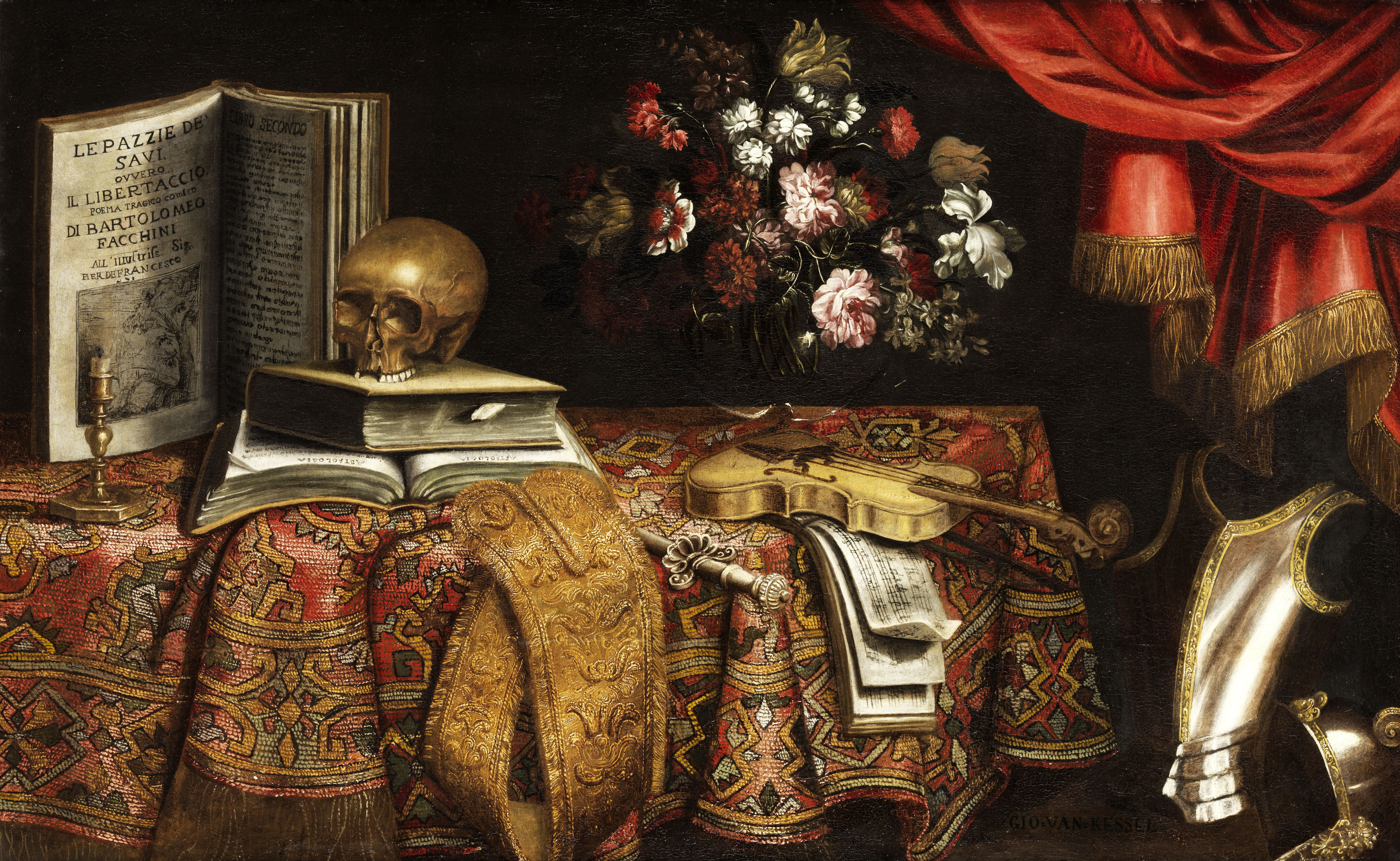
Vanitas still life (by 1681)

Initially a pupil of Daniele Crespi, Cittadini moved to Bologna before the age of 20 to study with Guido Reni, whose influence is clearly evident in such early works as the Stoning of Saint Stephen, the Flagellation and the Crowning with Thorns in the church of Santo Stefano, Bologna. He travelled to Rome in the mid-1640s and came into contact with the French and Flemish artists living there. This international melting pot gave rise to an original artistic vocabulary aimed at the naturalistic depiction of reality in a vast number of still lifes, landscapes and portraits. He also painted decorative frescoes for the Ducal Palace of Sassuolo.
