= Serafino de' Serafini =

Italian painter

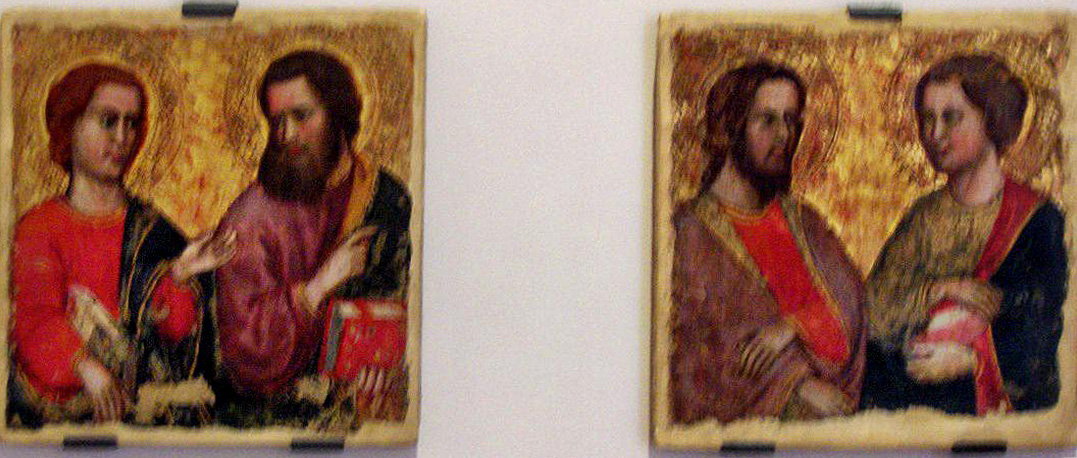
Four Apostles, City Museum of Rimini

Serafino de' Serafini (1323–1393), also spelled Seraphino de' Seraphini, was an Italian painter, active in Modena in the late 14th century.

== Biography ==
He is known for a Coronation of the Virgin and other subjects in Modena Cathedral. The Coronation bears the inscription "Seraphinus de Seraphinis pinxit 1385 die Jovis x.x.i.i.i. Marcii. Little is known of this artist; we may conclude that he was probably of some importance in his time, from the following inscription in a chapel, not named, painted by him:

Mille trecento con septanta sei
Erano corso gli anni del Signore
E'l quarto entrava quando a so honore
Questa Capella al nobel fin minei.
Et io, che tutta in si la storiei
Fui Serafin da Mutina Pittore.

The 19th-century art historians Crowe and Cavalcaselle generally dismiss the power of Seraphini, stating that in his work, the Bolognese style alternates with some Giottesque feeling. His execution is rude, his color dull and flat and coldly shadowed.
