= San Carlo, Modena =

Church building in Modena, Italy

San Carlo is a Baroque-style, former Roman Catholic church in Modena, Italy. It has been deconsecrated and is used as an auditorium.

== History ==
Construction of the present church began in 1664 using designs of Bartolomeo Avanzini. The apse has a large painting San Carlo Borromeo among the people of Milan afflicted by the plague of 1576 by Marcantonio Franceschini.
