= Jean Boulanger (engraver) =

French line-engraver

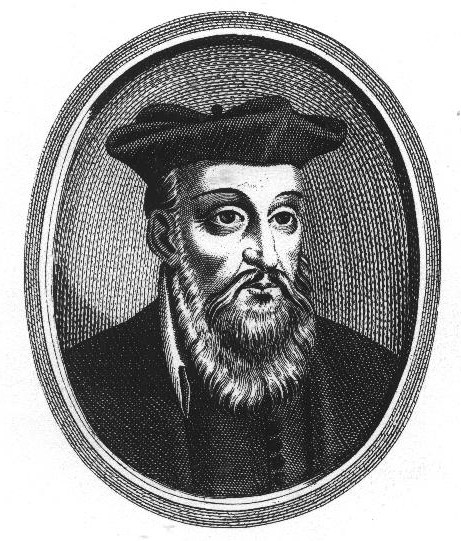
Portrait of Nostradamus.

Jean Boulanger, a French line-engraver, son of the painter Olivier Boulanger and cousin to the painter of the same name, was born at Amiens in 1608 and baptized in Troyes in Champagne on 24 January 1608; he had five children with Marie Judon. He was documented in Paris in 1645 and resided in the parish of Saint-Etienne-du-Mont.

He seems to have attached himself at first to an imitation of the style of François de Poilly. An engraving, dated 1669–93, an impression of which is at the British Museum, representing the Holy Family with St John the Baptist, was engraved by Jean Boulanger and published by François de Poilly. The Ashmolean Museum possesses a drawing dated 1669-80 which corresponds very closely in style and composition to the just mentioned engraving and which has been recently identified as Boulanger's own invention rather than a drawing after another master. He also engraved with François de Poilly a group of ornament drawings by Jean Cotelle the Elder (1607–76), which are part of the collection of the Ashmolean Museum, and which were published in Paris around 1647 with the title Livres de divers ornemens pour plafonds, cintres surbaissez, galleries et autres de l'invention de Jean Cotelle, Peintre Ordinaire du Roy.

He later took up a mode of engraving similar to that of his contemporary Jean Morin, but which he greatly improved, of finishing the flesh and naked parts of his figures with dots, instead of strokes, or with a mixture of both. This gave a very soft and mellow effect; but as he finished the draperies and backgrounds with rather a harsh use of the graver, there was a want of union in the effect of his plates. Notwithstanding this defect, his prints have considerable merit, and are justly held in esteem.

He died in Amiens about 1680.

== Portraits ==
- Maria Tberesa of Austria, Queen of France; after Frère Luc.
- Pope Urban VIII; J. Boulanger inv. et fec.
- Charles II, King of England.
- Gustavus Adolphus, King of Sweden.
- Leopold, King of the Romans.
- Henry of Castile, Abbot of St. Martin.
- J. Regnault de Segrais, of the French Academy.
- J. Jacques Olier, Cure of St. Sepulcre.
- Paul Beurier, Canon of St. Genevieve; after Jacq Le Fèvre.
- Daniel de Cosnac, Archbishop of Aix; after Claude Le Febvre.
- V. Louis de Seckendorf; after C. Scheffer.
- Michael Nostradamus, Physician. (pictured)
- St. Vincent de Paul.
- Mademoiselle Le Gras, Foundress of the Filles de la Charite.
- Francis Isidor de Hayrien.
- François de Clermont, Bishop of Noyon.

== Subjects from his own designs ==
- Two Busts of our Saviour and the Virgin Mary.
- Bust of the Virgin, surrounded by a border of Laurel; oval.
- The Virgin Mary and Infant Jesus; half length.
- The Virgin Mary and Infant, with St. John presenting a Cross

== Subjects after different masters ==
- The Virgin and Infant Christ holding some Pinks, called the Virgin of the Pinks; after Raphael.
- A Bust of the Virgin; inscribed Mater amabilis; after the same.
- The Holy Family, with St. Joseph giving the Infant some Cherries; after Carracci.
- The Virgin of Passau; after Solario.
- The Virgin Mary, with the Infant sleeping in her Arms; after Guido.
- The Virgin and Infant Jesus, with St. John kissing his Foot; after the same.
- The Holy Family; after Noel Coypel.
- The Holy Family; half-length figures; after Nic. Loir.
- The Infant Christ; inscribed Salvator Mundi, &c.; after the same. 1651.
- Christ bearing His Cross; after Nic. Mignard.
- The Virgin and Infaut, with St. John kissing His Foot; after P. Mignard.
- The Descent from the Cross; after S. Bourdon.
- The Entombment of Christ; after the same.
- The Crucifixion; after Ch. le Brun.
- St. Francis de Paula; after S. Vouet.
- The Dead Christ supported by Joseph of Arimathea.
- The Pompous Cavalcade on the occasion of Louis XIV coming of age.

== Bibliography ==
- R. A. Weigert, Inventaire du fonds français. Graveurs du XVIIe siècle, Paris, 1951, II, pp. 1–51.
- A. Aceto, 'A Rediscovered Drawing by Jean Boulanger (1608-c.1680)', Print Quarterly, XXXIII, (2016), pp. 406–414.
