= Martina Bagnoli =

Italian art historian and curator

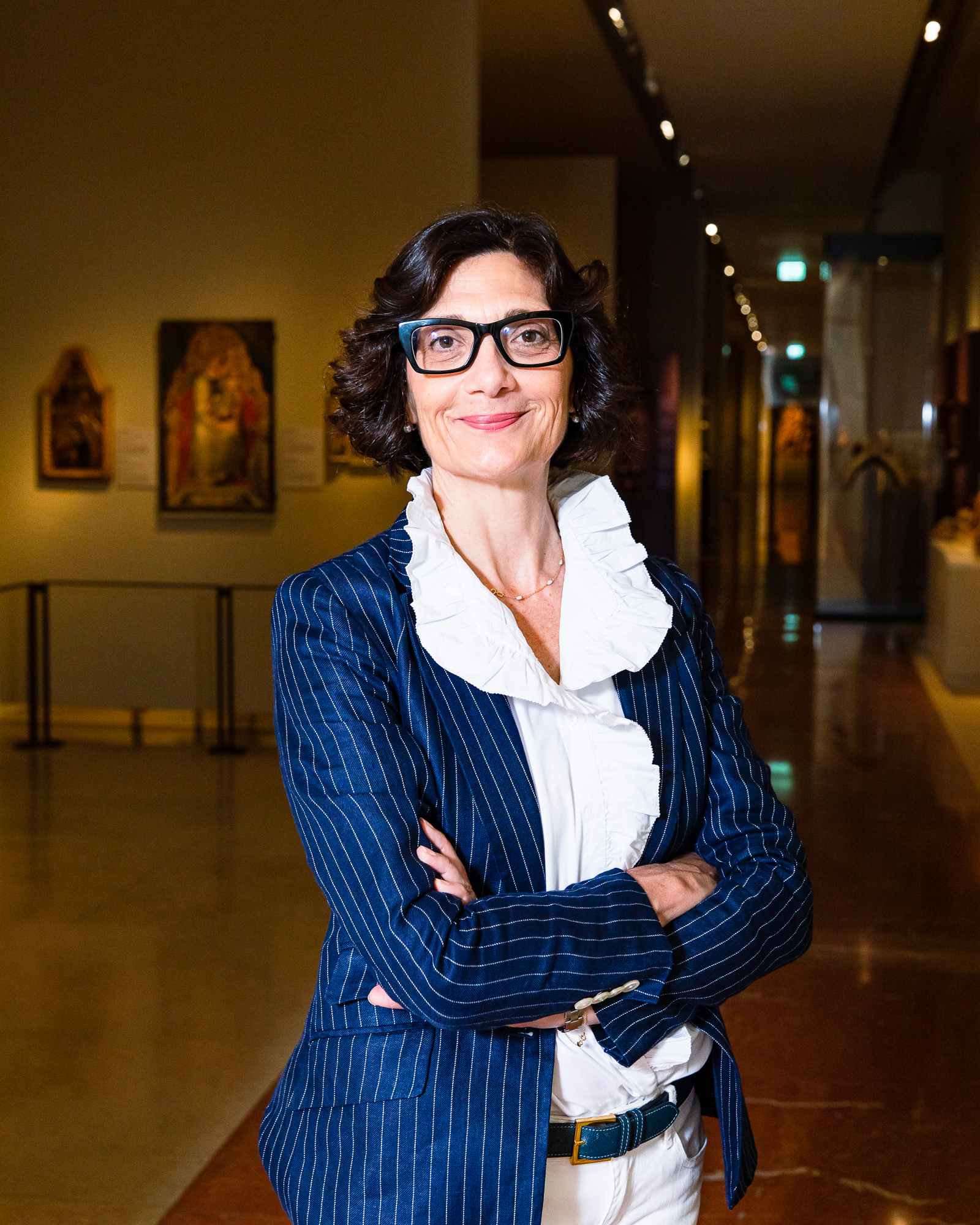
- Born: 1964 (age 61–62); Bolzano, Italy
- Education: University of Cambridge (BA, MA); Johns Hopkins University (PhD)
- Occupations: Art historian, curator, museum director
- Employer: Gallerie Estensi

Martina Bagnoli (born 1964) is an Italian art historian and curator. She is the director of the Gallerie Estensi and chair of the Europeana Foundation. Previously, from 2002 to 2015, Bagnoli was curator of medieval art for the Walters Art Museum in Maryland, United States.

== Biography ==
Bagnoli was born in Bolzano, Italy. She was educated at Downing College, Cambridge, where she earned a BA in art history (1987) and an MA (1991). She completed her PhD at Johns Hopkins University in 1999. Bagnoli joined the Walters Art Museum in Baltimore, Maryland as assistant curator in 2002. She organised exhibitions such as Treasures of Heaven (2011) and A Feast for the Senses (2017) and ended her tenure as the Andrew W. Mellon Curator and head of the museum's collection of medieval art and manuscripts. Around this time she also worked for the National Gallery of Art in Washington, D.C.

In 2015, Bagnoli was named director of the Galleria Estense in Modena, Italy, itself a part of the Gallerie Estensi. Her appointment was part of an international search by the Italian Ministry of Culture to appoint directors for twenty Italian institutions and heritage sites, also including the Uffizi, the Galleria Borghese, and the Gallerie dell'Accademia (Venice). In May 2017, her appointment through the initiative, and that of four other directors, was voided following a ruling by the Lazio regional administrative tribunal. Bagnoli returned to her position a month later after the Council of State, the country's highest administrative court, temporarily suspended the ruling until a public hearing later that year. As director, she oversaw the launch of the Estense Digital Library in 2020.

In 2021, Bagnoli was elected chair of the board of the Europeana Foundation.
