= Gallerie Estensi =

Museum and library network in Italy

The Gallerie Estensi is a network of three museums and a library, bringing together the collective fruits of artistic production from Ferrara, Modena and Sassuolo in the Emilia-Romagna region of Northern Italy. The galleries aim to preserve the historic heritage left by the influential House of Este, with a focus on relating their past to the local communities at each site.

== The concept ==
The museum is dedicated to making art history accessible to all. The collections are perhaps most famous for their variety, touching each realm of the Liberal Arts from antiquity to the 18th century. This includes a large collection of Baroque oil paintings of Christian subject; perhaps one of the most extensive collections of Renaissance bronze medals and coins in Europe, a rare group of decorative musical instruments as well as frescoes, panel and oil paintings.

The museum want to be "a single and purposeful voice of a shared cultural identity."

== Galleria Estense ==
Established in 1854 by Francesco V of Austria-Este and located since 1894 at its current address in the Palazzo dei Musei, the Estense Gallery includes four salons and sixteen exhibition rooms dedicated to the artistic heritage nurtured by the dukes and duchesses of Este throughout their years as leaders of Ferrara, but mostly focusing on the period following the move of the ducal seat capital from Ferrara to Modena in 1598.

Gathered by aristocratic collectors with multiple interests, the Este collections include a collection of paintings dating from the fourteenth to the eighteenth centuries, including a group from the Po Valley school of painting, various sculptures in marble and terracotta; a large number of high quality decorative objects which formed part of the furnishings in the various ducal residences, as well as collections of drawings, bronzes, majolica, medals, ivories and musical instruments. Among the works by famous artists are a Pietà by Cima da Conegliano, a Madonna with Child by Correggio, a Portrait of Francesco I d'Este by Velázquez, a Triptych by El Greco, a marble bust of Francesco I d'Este by Bernini and a Crucifix by Guido Reni.

== Museo Lapidario Estense ==
The Estense Lapidary Museum was the first public museum established in Modena. Founded by Francis IV of Austria-Este, restored duke of Modena, on March 31, 1828, its birth was inspired by examples such as the Maffeiano Lapidary Museum of Verona (1738), or the Lapidary Gallery in the Chiaramonti Museum in the Vatican (1800-1823), but with an emphasis on civilians: aiming to glorify the past of the city from its Roman origins.

The initial nucleus consisted of some pieces already preserved in the Ducal Palace of Modena, acquired by the d'Estes from other antique collections or as excavation finds from the duchy territories of Brescello and Novellara. Right from the start, the citizens, together with the representatives of the clergy and the nobility, donated materials from their personal collections to make up the collection of the museum, which within a couple of years required a significant expansion, certified by the two commemorative epigraphs of its benefactors (from 1828 and 1830) still preserved today. Carlo Malmusi, directing curator, established the institution's guiding principles in 1830 as: "serv{ing} archeology", "for the memory of illustrious ancestors" with "finds from the Roman age." The catalogue immediately prompted an influx of antiques and sepulchral tombs which, until the late seventeenth century, had been placed in the churchyard near the southern side of Modena's cathedral or in other sacred buildings of Modena and Reggio Emilia. The practice of raising funerary monuments had already been established in the pre-humanist era, following the example of nearby Bologna, in memory of those citizens who had distinguished themselves above all in the fields of law and medicine.

== Biblioteca Estense Universitaria ==
Rich in ancient codices, musical scores, cartography, drawings, prints and exquisite illuminated manuscripts, The Estense library stands as a key player in the d’Este inheritance. Established around the same time as the Galleria Estense, it has been considered by some Italian scholars as one of the most important art-historical libraries in Europe, not least due to the sheer variety of subject-matter documented by its folios. Works of exceptionally rare quality from the 4th century in Egypt to the 1930s, including the famed Bible of Borso d’Este, and the earliest attempts by the Ferrarese to map Catalan in the New World.

The library has been coveted by the House of Este: smuggled into exile both in 1598 with Cesare I and in 1859 with Francesco V providing a testament to the quality of its collection. Sheet music dating from the Renaissance, evangelical texts written in Greek Unical font, various French manuscripts from the 14th century, a family tree of the Byzantine theologian Joannes Zonaras, a Persian picture book of Romeo and Juliet by Nizami (Layla and Manjun) as well as several other psalters, encyclopaedias and maps of a regal, political and theological nature, each exclusive to the European dukes and duchesses of Emilia-Romagna, may be consulted, some of which require official permission.

== Pinacoteca Nazionale (Ferrara) ==
The Pinacotecta Nazionale is the national art gallery of Ferrara, also located in the Emilia-Romagna region on the piano nobile (or first floor) of Biagio Rossetti's Renaissance jewel, the Palazzo dei Diamanti. (commissioned by Leonello d’Este in 1447). It was founded in 1836 by the Municipality of Ferrara after Napoleon’s widespread dissolution of churches threatened the protection of important public artworks. The gallery is formed as much around notable northern Italian painters as it is around the exquisite interior decoration of the palace itself, together with remnants of frescoes from local churches and later acquisitions from the Sacrati Strozzi collection.

Not to be confused with the Civic Museum on the lower floor, hosting temporary exhibitions of contemporary art since 1992, the Pinacoteca houses an altogether more historic collection of paintings and sculptures by artists of the Ferrarese school dating from the thirteenth to the eighteenth century. The Pinacoteca, unlike the Galleria Estense, focuses more specifically on artistic production during the earlier half of the Estensi history, from their promotion as dukes of Ferrara in 1296 to their forced relocation to Modena in 1598. Such dukes include Leonello, Borso, Ercole I, Alfonso I and Alfonso II d’Este.

Arranged chronologically, the exhibition begins with a room dedicated to late Gothic sculpture, fresco and panel painting, progressing through to the early Renaissance, the sixteenth century, Mannerism and lastly to the early seventeenth-century before Cesare I lost Ferrara to papal rule. Highlights of the tour include the Hall of Honour, the sixteenth-century apartments of Virginia de' Medici, (in which the roundels painted by a young Carracci workshop are still visible in Modena's Galleria Estense) and a room dedicated to the step-by-step process of creating a fresco, panel or oil painting complementing Cennino Cennini’s Il Libro dell’arte.

== Palazzo Ducale (Sassuolo) ==
The Ducal Palace in Sassuolo, situated a short drive outside Modena, is widely considered as one of the most important baroque residences in northern Italy. A summer residence built by the architect Bartolomeo Avanzini on the request of Duke Francesco I d'Este in 1634, it was adapted from the older family d'Este castle into a modern suburban residence for the court. Wall paintings, stucco decorations, sculptures, fountains and vistas still convey a sense of baroque "delight" today, despite the palace having long remained in the shadows of public knowledge. After many years under military administration and a complex restoration project, the palace was definitively taken over by the Ministry of Cultural Heritage and Activities and Tourism in 2004. It's stuccoed apartments currently host one of Gallerie's many on-going projects to marry the old with the new: minimalist pieces from the renowned Panza collection now hang in the frames previously filled by the duke's favourite contemporary paintings.
