= Bartolomeo Avanzini =

Italian architect

Bartolomeo Avanzini (1608–1658) was an Italian architect of the Baroque period, active mainly in Modena, Sassuolo and Reggio Emilia.

The design for the Palazzo Ducale of Modena has been attributed to Avanzini, though between 1631 and 1634 Girolamo Rainaldi played a role in the initial plans. There appear to have been comments made on the construction by Borromini, Pietro da Cortona and Bernini. The latter viewed progress during a stop in Modena in 1665. Camillo-Guarino Guarini also played a role after 1680.

Other works by Avanzini include:

- Ducal palace of Sassuolo
- Palazzo Vescovile (Bishop's Palace) in Reggio Emilia
- Palazzo Busetti in Reggio Emilia (attributed)
- Chiesa dei Santi Carlo e Agata in Reggio Emilia (attributed)

== Sources ==
- Wittkower, Rudolf (1993). Pelican History of Art (ed.). Art and Architecture Italy, 1600-1750. 1980. Penguin Books Ltd. p. 291.
