= Jean Boulanger (painter) =

French painter

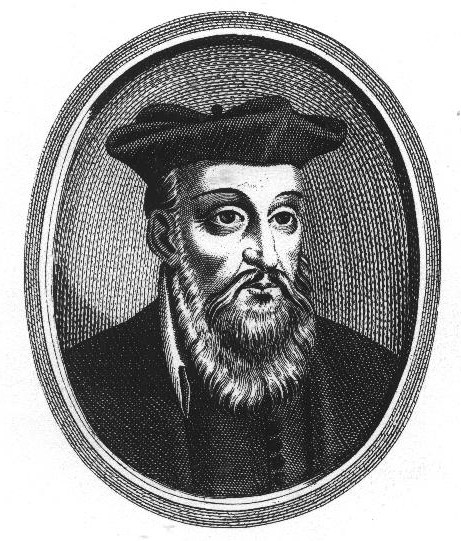
Portrait of Nostradamus after a 17th-century engraving by Jean Boulanger

Jean Boulanger (1606–1660) was a French painter active in Italy during the Baroque period.

He was born in Troyes, France. He appears to have had some training under Guido Reni in Bologna. One of his more famous works are the frescoes at the Ducal palace of Sassuolo. He was buried in the church of San Vicenzio in Modena. His pupils include Tommaso Costa and Sigismondo Caula at Modena.
