= San Bartolomeo, Modena =

Church in Modena, Italy

Coordinates: 44.6445°N 10.9255°E

- Chiesa di San Bartolomeo
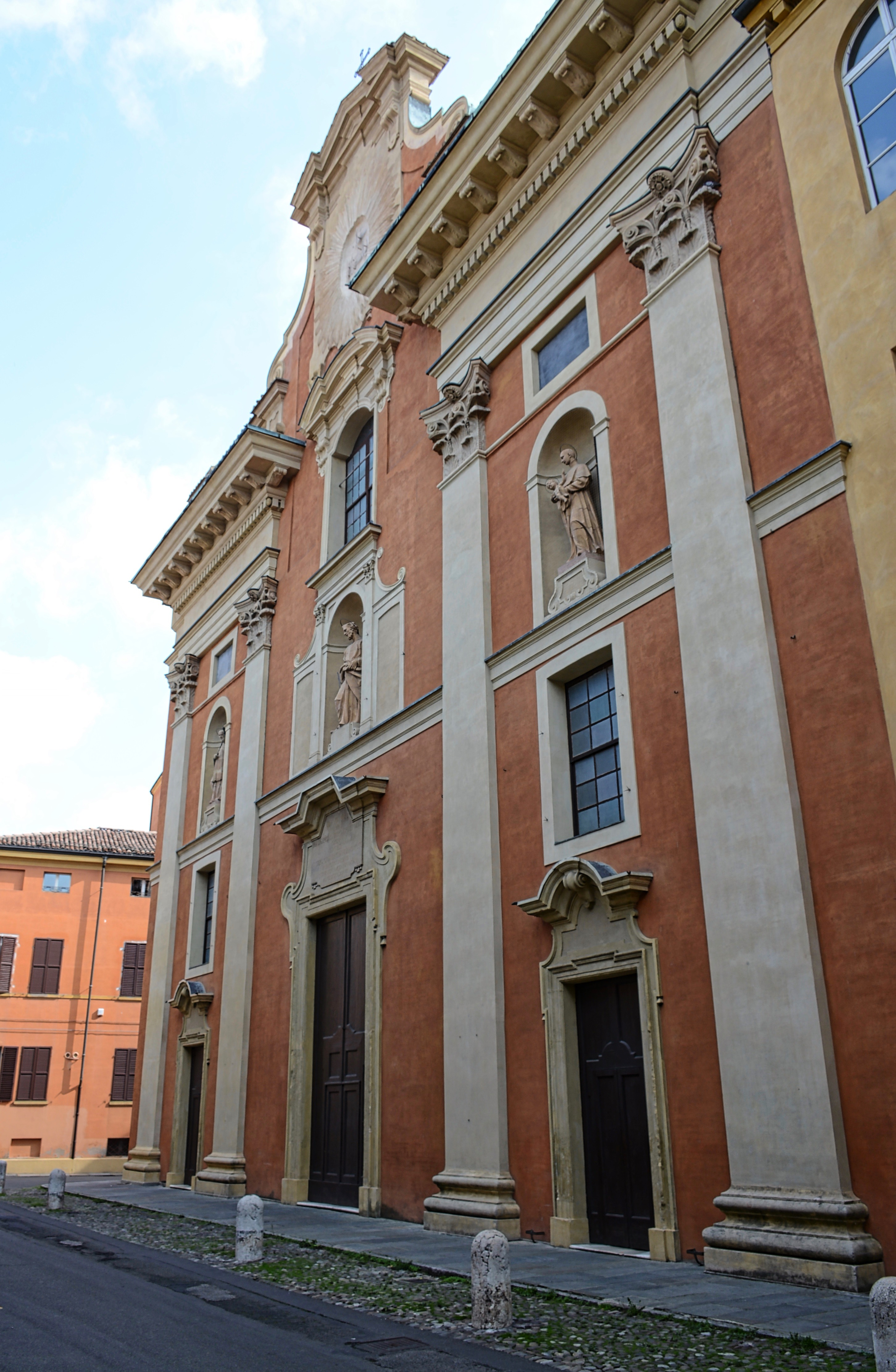

Religion
- Affiliation: Roman Catholic
- Rite: Roman

Location
- Location: Modena, Italy
- Interactive map of San Bartolomeo, Modena

San Bartolomeo is a Baroque church in Modena.

== History ==
The present church was built for the Jesuit order and replaced a parish church at the site. The design by a Jesuit priest Giorgio Soldati of Lugano, by the Cardinal Alessandro d'Este. The construction began in 1607 and in 1629 was completed with the erection of the bell-tower. The façade (1727) was designed and finished by the architect Andrea Galluzzi. The statues in the niches represent Saint Bartolomew and Christ, as well as two Jesuit saints: Stanislao Kostka and Luigi Gonzaga.

Near to the entrance are stuccoes by Antonio Traeri, and above the entrance is a large canvas depicting the Martyrdom of St Bartholomew (1694) by Girolamo Negri. The ceiling of the nave was frescoed by Giuseppe Barbieri (1642–1733), disciple of Andrea Pozzo, and depicts the Apotheosis of the Divine Image and the Glories of Saint Ignatius, Francis Xavier, and Bartholemew. The pendentives of the dome are painted with allegories of the four cardinal virtues. In the first chapel on the left is an altarpiece depicting 'the Death of St Joseph by Jean Boulanger; in the second chapel on the left, is an Annunciation by Jacopo Ligozzi and other paintings by Lorenzo Garbieri. In the first altar to the right of the entrance is a canvas depicting St Orsula at the Crucifixion by Sante Peranda.

The chapel dedicated to St Ignatius has paintings by Giacinto Brandi and Giovanni Maria Viani. To the right of the presbytery, the St Francis Xavier chapel contains paintings by Francesco del Cairo and Jacopino Consetti. The high altar presents a monumental ciborium crafted from valuable marble and bronze and completed in 1620 by Giovanni Battista Bassoli, Cecilio Bezi, Giovanni Battista Censori, and Antonio Traeri. Along the nave are paintings by Ludovico Lana and Giuseppe Romani. On the walls, paintings by Giuseppe Maria Crespi, Antonio Pomarancio, and Piero Petruzzini. The present organ (1903) by the brothers Rieger replaces a 17th-century organ, lost in a 1902 fire, by the Jesuit Willem Hermans.

== See also ==
- List of Jesuit sites
