= Soldati =

Soldati is an Italian surname. Notable people with the surname include:

- Adam Soldati
- Carlo Soldati
- Evandro Soldati, Brazilian male model
- Franco Soldati, Italian Commercial director
- Giorgio Soldati
- Jennifer Soldati, American politician
- Kimiko Soldati (born 1974), American diver
- Mario Soldati, Italian writer and film director
- Santiago Soldati, Argentine businessman

== See also ==
- Villa Soldati, a neighbourhood in Buenos Aires, Argentina, located in the South-West of the city
- Soldati class destroyer, a group of destroyers built for the Italian Navy during World War II
- Soldati class patrol frigate, Lupo-class frigates ordered by Iraq in 1980 as part of a naval expansion program just before the Iran–Iraq War
