= Fuse* =

Multidisciplinary art studio in Modena, Italy

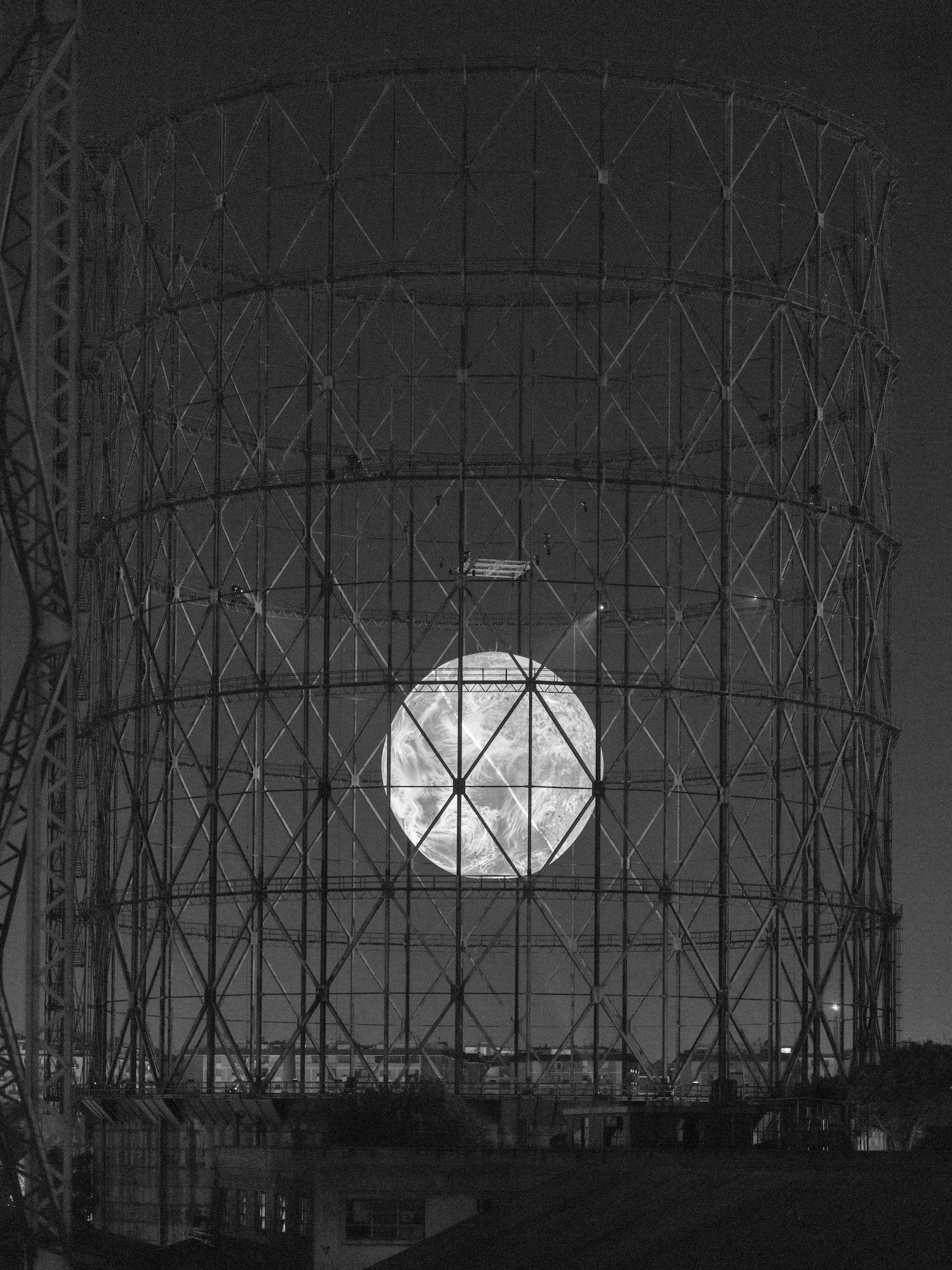
Installation view of the immersive A/V installation Luna Somnium by fuse*, in the Gazometro Ostiense in Rome, IT.

Fuse (stylised as fuse*) is a multidisciplinary art studio based in Modena, Italy.

== History ==
fuse* was founded in 2007 by Luca Camellini and Mattia Carretti in Campogalliano, a small town north of Modena, Italy. Friends since childhood, they started mixing their different skills and interests to technically support external organizations and companies after graduating from their respective colleges. Camellini graduated with a degree in Computer Engineering from the University of Modena and Reggio Emilia, and has pursued his passion for computer programming and graphical simulations, whilst Carretti graduated with a degree in Chemistry and later in Business Administration from the Polytechnic University of Milan. Their passion for digital arts, technology and science brought them to merge the three through immersive art installation and artworks. Sound design has always been one of the main pillars of the studio, and in 2009 sound designer Riccardo Bazzoni also joined fuse*. Snow Fall was the first artistic project realized in 2009 in Modena, which consisted of an interactive installation that processed images of the audience captured by video cameras in real time, displaying the silhouettes of the audience surrounded by snowflakes. This first version was created with infrared cameras while the successive iterations of the work, exhibited in Manchester, UK (2015) and Washington DC, US (2019), employed new and more modern hardware and software.

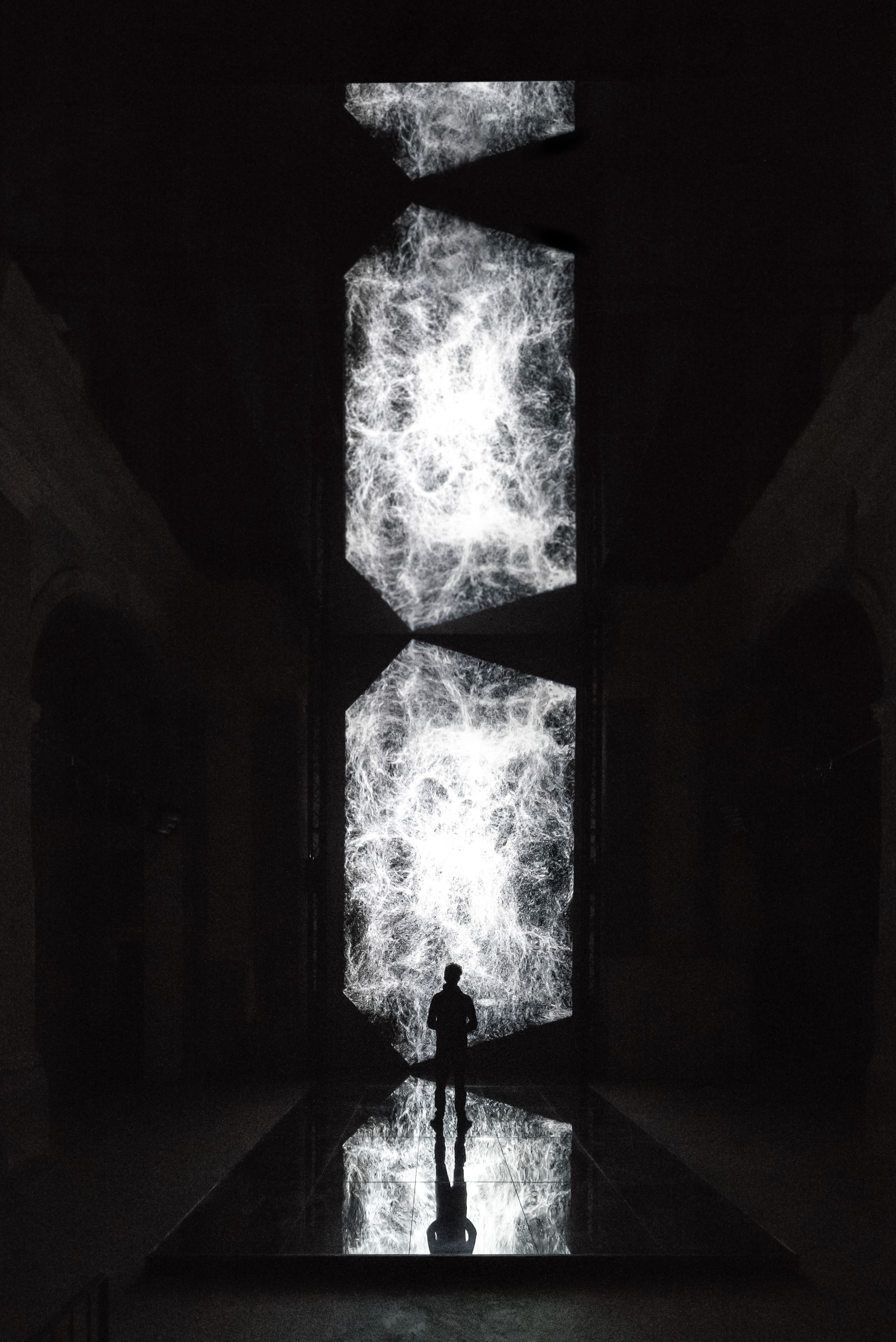
Installation view of the A/V installation Multiverse, at Bonanni del Rio Catalog in Parma, IT.

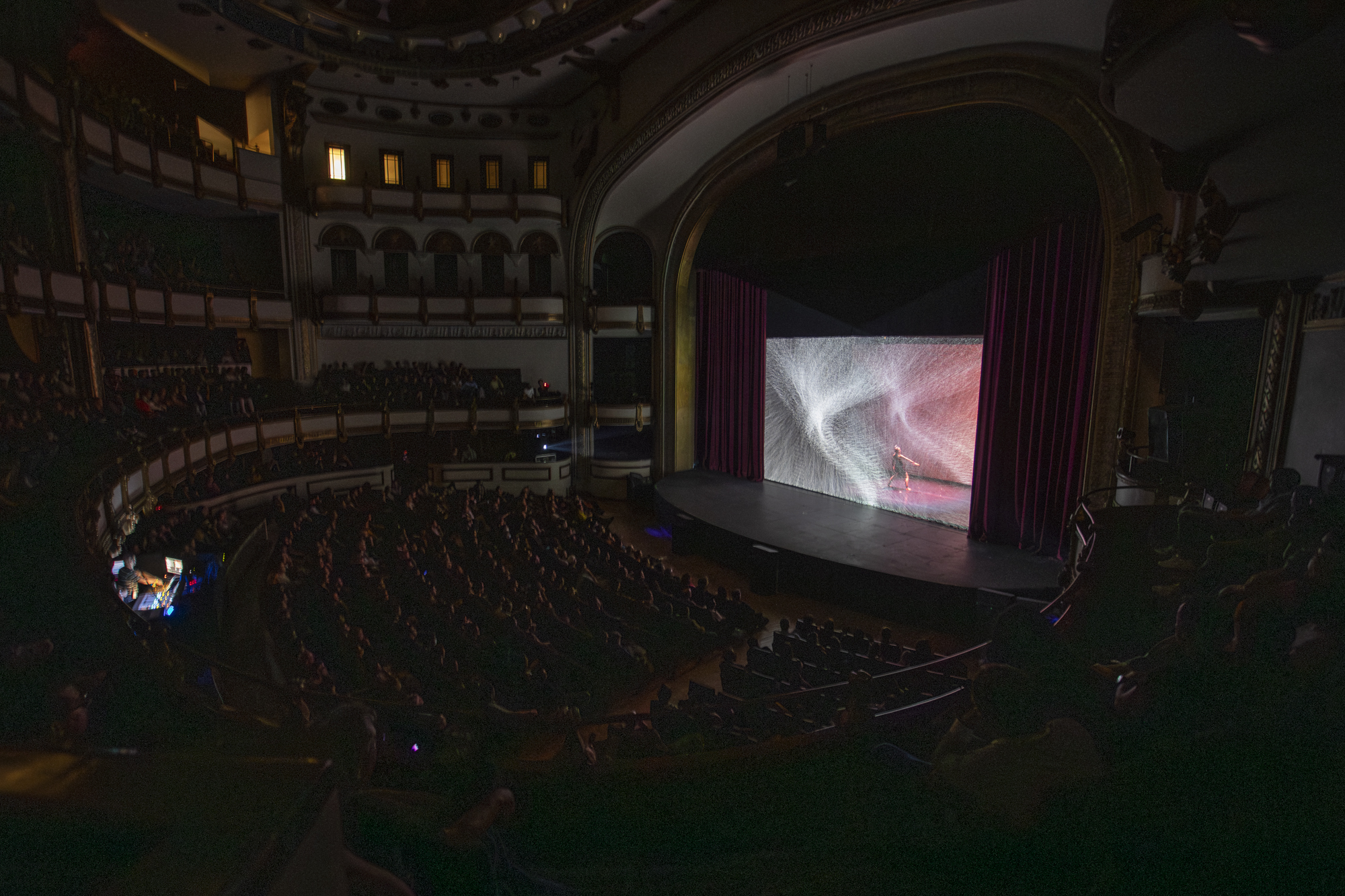
Shot of the live media performance Dökk by fuse*, at Mutek MX 2023.

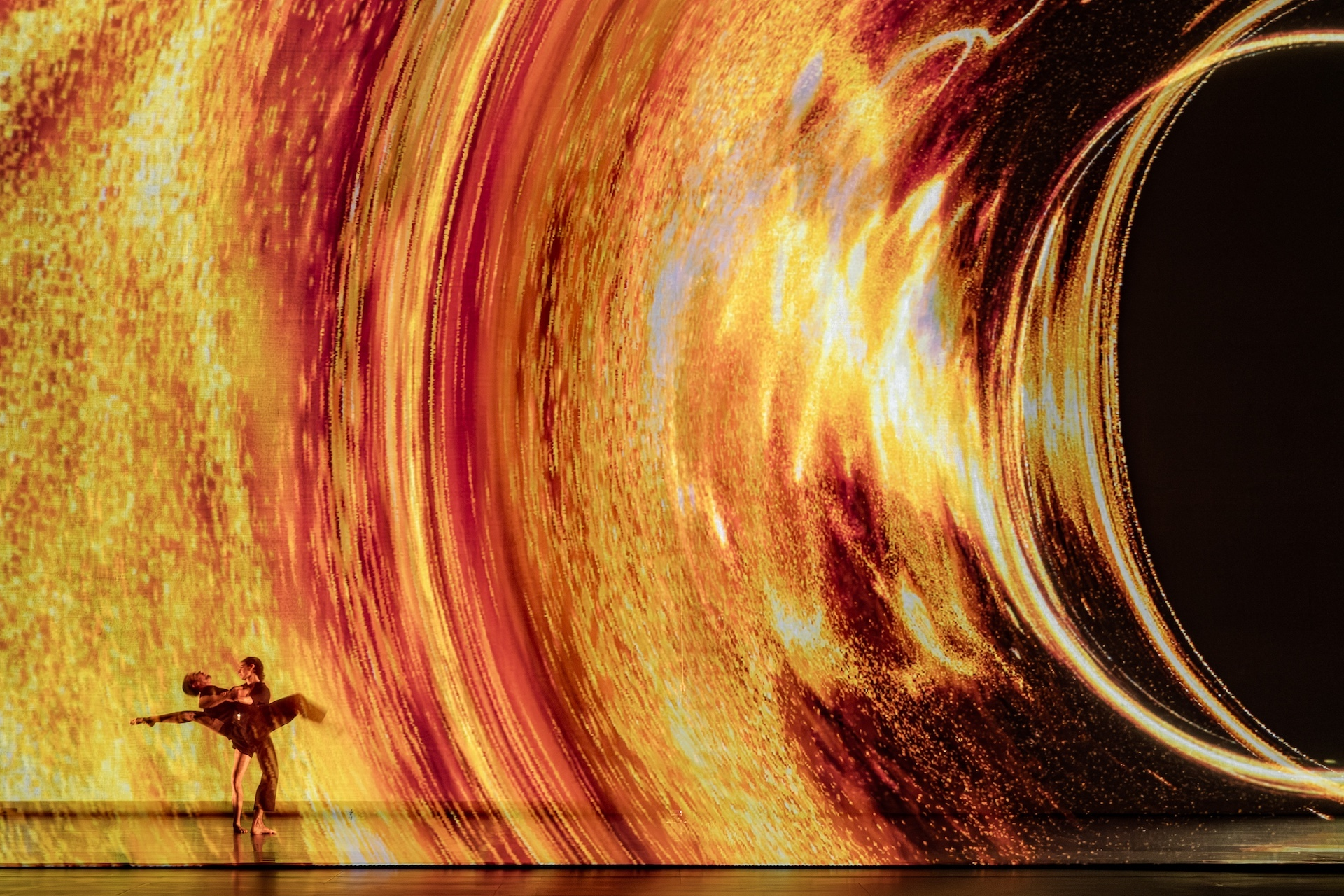
Shot of the live media performance Sál by fuse*, at National Taichung Theatre, 2025, ph. by Matteo Torsani

In 2011, the studio began to experiment with live performances based on the real-time interaction between sound, movement and light. N 4.0, an art piece which is projected onto a variety of architectural backgrounds, was first presented in 2011 for the Celeste Prize art competition, in which the piece won the award for Live Media/Performance. Continuing to experiment with live performances, fuse* started developing a trilogy composed of Ljòs (Light in Icelandic), Dökk (Darkness) and Sál (Soul) in 2014. Ljòs and Dökk are currently on tour and have been presented at international festivals such as Mutek - Montreal (CA), Kikk - Namur (BE), Digilogue - Istanbul (TR) and RomaEuropa - Rome (IT). Sál, the third and final chapter of the trilogy, premiered at the prestigious National Taichung Theatre in Taiwan in April 2025, marking a significant milestone for the studio. The performance was presented to an audience of over 1,500 people and represented the culmination of several years of artistic and technological research. Developed over several years of research on the behaviour of matter around black holes in collaboration with KU Leuven and the University of Toronto, Sál explores this fleeting threshold between one state and another, examining the intricate emotional dynamics that unfold in these moments of uncertainty and instability.

Over the years, the studio has developed more and more immersive artistic experiences that have traveled all around the world and have been exhibited, among others, in Prague (CZ), Beijing (CN), Milan (IT), Barcelona (ES), Helsinki (FI) and Atlanta (US).

Multiverse premiered in 2017 in Parma, Italy with a monumental installation consisting of a vertical projection and two mirroring surfaces 7.5 meters high. The work builds on the multiverse theory of Lee Smolin and won awards such as the Art and Science Innovation Award from Tsinghua University and the National Museum of China. In 2020, the studio started diving into the concept of trust and developed Treu, a piece examining the relationship between economics, politics, and trust, presented at the Pochen Symposium of 2020. The concept has been further developed for the studio's second solo show at Artechouse NYC, titled Trust (2022): Exploring the Theme from Different Timelines, the installation also includes a sentiment analysis of 750,000 tweets containing the word “trust” uploaded during the pandemic.

That same year, the studio released Artificial Botany, an ongoing project exploring botanical illustrations through machine learning algorithms: premiered at Cosmo Caixa in Barcelona (ES), it has later been adapted for shows in Venice (IT) and Utrecht (NL). In particular, the project has also been adapted for the spaces of Unipol's Cultura Bologna, using illustrations from the herbarium guides of Ulisse Aldrovandi provided by the University Library of Bologna, the Botanical Garden of Bologna and Alma Mater Studiorum.

In July 2022, fuse* created Luna Somnium, a site-specific installation for the Festival of Vision and Digital Transition held in the Gazometro of Rome. The piece consisted of a sphere suspended within the cylindrical metal structure of the Gazometro, with projections of the moon displayed upon it. The piece is said to be inspired by Johannes Kepler, who gazed upon the moon and saw a new side of it, just as viewers do as they walk around the Gazometro.

The studio also collaborated with Nederlands Kamerkoor, combining the choir's music with the visuals of their live media performance Van Gogh in Me, generated from paintings of Vincent van Gogh and Gustav Klimt. The piece premiered in the Konzerthaus in Vienna, and later was on exhibit at the Koninklijk Theater Carré in Amsterdam.

From 2016 until 2023 to 2023, fuse* has been actively involved in the organisation of NODE, an international festival for digital arts and live-media held in Modena.

In 2023, Onirica (), a new audiovisual, immersive installation, premiered at INOTA Festival in Veszprém (HU). For this particular artwork, the studio collaborated with two dream banks: the first from the Laboratory of Psychophysiology of Dream and Sleep of the University of Bologna, and the second from the psychology department of the University of California Santa Cruz, created by psychologists G. W. Domhoff and A. Schneider. Onirica () collects 28,748 dreams from these two banks and translates them into an audiovisual experience through a Large Language Model (LLM) and a custom pipeline that included a text-to-image diffusion model.

In addition to the installation, fuse* has also developed the live media performance Onirica (). In this adaptation, the visuals representing dreams are dynamically generated in response to the movements of a dancer, creating an interplay between physical performance and digital imagery.

In 2025, the studio premiered Mimicry, an artistic series that imagines speculative hybrid species existing at the intersection of plants and insects, generated through artificial intelligence to reflect nature’s adaptive strategies. Drawing inspiration from Donna Haraway’s essay “The Promises of Monsters”, the project invokes evolutionary concepts such as exaptation and mimicry, positing new forms of coexistence that respond to ecological stressors and climate change. The artwork was presented to the public at the Light Art Museum in Budapest (HU) in September 2025.

== Works ==
- Mimicry, 2025
- Sál, 2025
- Onirica () (performance), 2024
- Onirica (), 2023
- Luna Somnium, 2022
- Trust, 2022
- Van Gogh in Me, 2022
- Fragile, 2022
- Multiverse.dome, 2021
- Treu, 2020
- Falin Mynd, 2020
- Mimesis, 2020
- Artificial Botany, 2020
- Everything in Existence, 2019
- Multiverse, 2018
- Dökk, 2017
- Amygdala, 2016
- Clepsydra, 2016
- Ljós, 2014
- N 4.0, 2011
- Snow Fall, 2009

== Selected exhibitions and shows ==
Year	Work	Location	City
2025	Dökk	Stanford University	Stanford
2025	Onirica ()	Lost Art Festival	Berlin
2025	Mimicry	Light Art Museum	Budapest
2025	Onirica ()	Videocittà	Rome
2025	Sál	National Taichung Theatre	Taichung
2025	Onirica ()	Triennale	Milan
2025	Artificial Botany	Palazzo Ducale	Genoa
2025	Onirica ()	T33	Shenzhen
2024	Onirica ()	Universum	Mexico City
2024	Onirica ()	Centro Cultural Pozu Santa Bárbara	Mieres
2024	Unseen Flora	A4 Museum	Chengdu
2024	Van Gogh in Me	Grand Theatre	Shanghai
2024	Van Gogh in Me	Hong Kong Cultural Centre	Hong Kong
2024	Onirica ()	Espacio Fundación Telefónica	Madrid
2024	Onirica ()	MoCA Taipei	Taipei
2024	Artificial Botany	QinTai Art Museum	Wuhan
2024	Artificial Botany	Palazzo del Governatore	Parma
2023	Dökk	MUTEK.MX	Mexico City
2023	Onirica ()	Fondazione Alberto Peruzzo	Padua
2023	Artificial Botany	Dongdaemun Design Plaza	Seoul
2023	Multiverse .echo	Palazzo Cipolla	Rome
2023	Dökk	LEV Festival	Gijón
2023	Artificial Botany	Hong Kong Design Institute	Hong Kong
2022	Dökk	Yokohama Kannai Hall	Yokohama
2022	Multiverse .dome	MUTEK.MX	Mexico City
2022	Van Gogh in Me	Koninklijk Theater Carré	Amsterdam
2022	Luna Somnium	Videocittà Festival	Rome
2022	Artificial Botany	CUBO, Unipol	Bologna
2022	Trust	Artechouse	New York
2022	Falin Mynd	Lux	Helsinki
2021	Fragile	Artechouse	Washington DC
2021	Artificial Botany	Cosmo Caixa	Barcelona
2021	Ljós	Sónar Istanbul	Istanbul
2021	Dökk	LEV festival	Gijón
2021	Multiverse .dome	Taiwan Contemporary Culture Lab	Taipei
2020	Treu	Pochen Biennal	Chemnitz
2020	Mimesis	Transart Festival	Bolzano
2020	Falin Mynd	Malpensa Airport	Milan
2019	Multiverse	National Museum of China	Beijing
2019	Dökk	MUTEK	Montreal
2019	Dökk	MUTEK.SF	San Francisco
2019	Everything in Existence	Artechouse	Washington DC
2018	Multiverse	Borgo delle Colonne	Parma
2017	Dökk	TAxT Festival	Taoyuan
2016	Amygdala	Cubo Unipol	Bologna
2015	Ljós	STRP Biennial	Eindhoven
