= Girolamo Negri =

Italian painter

Girolamo Negri, also known as il Boccia (circa 1648 - after 1718) was an Italian painter of the Baroque period.

== Biography ==
Negri was born at Bologna. He initially trained with Domenico Maria Canuti, but then entered the studio of Lorenzo Pasinelli. He also painted in Modena, Mirandola, Faenza and Cesena. He painted an Apparition of the Virgin and Child to St Peter for the Bologna Cathedral. He painted the Denial by St Peter for the church of San Filippo Neri, Bologna.
