= Abraham ben Daniel =

- Born: 1511; Modena, Duchy of Modena and Reggio
- Died: 1578 (aged 66–67)
- Writing career
- Language: Hebrew

Abraham ben Daniel of Modena (Hebrew: אברהם בן דניאל ממודינה, romanized: Avraham ben Daniyyel mi-Modina; 1511–1578) was an Italian poet and rabbi.

== Biography ==
Abraham ben Daniel was born in the northern Italian city of Modena in the summer of 1511. He went abroad in the winter of 1530, first to Mantua, where he was a tutor with four families for six years. He was afterwards a tutor at Viadana, Modena, Rivarolo, Arezzo, and Forlì, and finally he became rabbi at Ferrara.

From 1536 to 1552, despite persistent medical issues, he composed over a thousand poetical prayers in various metre and forms, mostly in Hebrew but with six in Aramaic. Several of the poems were autobiographical, written for friends, or based on historical events. One of them is in honour of his cousin Hadassah, whom he married in October 1539. A manuscript collection of his prayers in the Bodleian Library (as of 1901) bears the title Sefer ha-Yashar ('The Book of the Righteous').

According to Adolf Neubauer, Abraham ben Daniel "had not the slightest poetical talent."
