= Song of the Watchmen of Modena =

9th-century Latin poem

The Song of the Watchmen of Modena (Italian: Canto delle scolte modenesi), also known by its incipit O tu qui servas ("O you who serve"), is an anonymous late ninth-century Latin lyric poem encouraging the guards who stood watch on the walls of Modena. The poem contains later interpolations (lines 11–16, 25–26, 30–34), but its musical notation has survived. Peter Godman called it "hauntingly beautiful".

Francesco Novati proposed that the song was written by a cleric in his cell as he listened to the chant of the guardsmen echo on the walls. This Romantic interpretation has been superseded. At about the same time as the lyric was composed, the walls of Modena were augmented for defence against the Magyars. Prayers pleading deliverance from their raids are preserved in the same manuscript as the watchmen's song. The song falls into the tradition of liturgical vigils (known to have been kept at Modena during this time) and the secular vigiliae murorum (vigils of the walls). It was probably composed for use at Mass sending off the guards for duty. The poet invokes the blessing of Christ, the Virgin, and John, who had lately seen a chapel consecrated in their honour on 26 July 881, a date which helps place the poem in time. The chapel of Santa Maria e San Giovanni was beside a city gate, and it was probably there that the guards assembled before their watch and joined the clergy in singing the song.

The poet cites two stories from classical history to encourage the guards: the Trojan War, and how the city was safe while Hector kept watch; and the Sacred Geese (derived from Virgil and Servius), who defended Rome from the Gauls. Lines 17–18 of the song—Pro qua virtute facta est argentea / Et a Romanis adorata ut dea—seem to be the poet's invention, based on his reading of Servius, or Isidore of Seville, who copied Servius.
