= Chiesa del Voto, Modena =

Church in Emilia-Romagna, Italy

Votive Church; Chiesa del Voto (Italian)
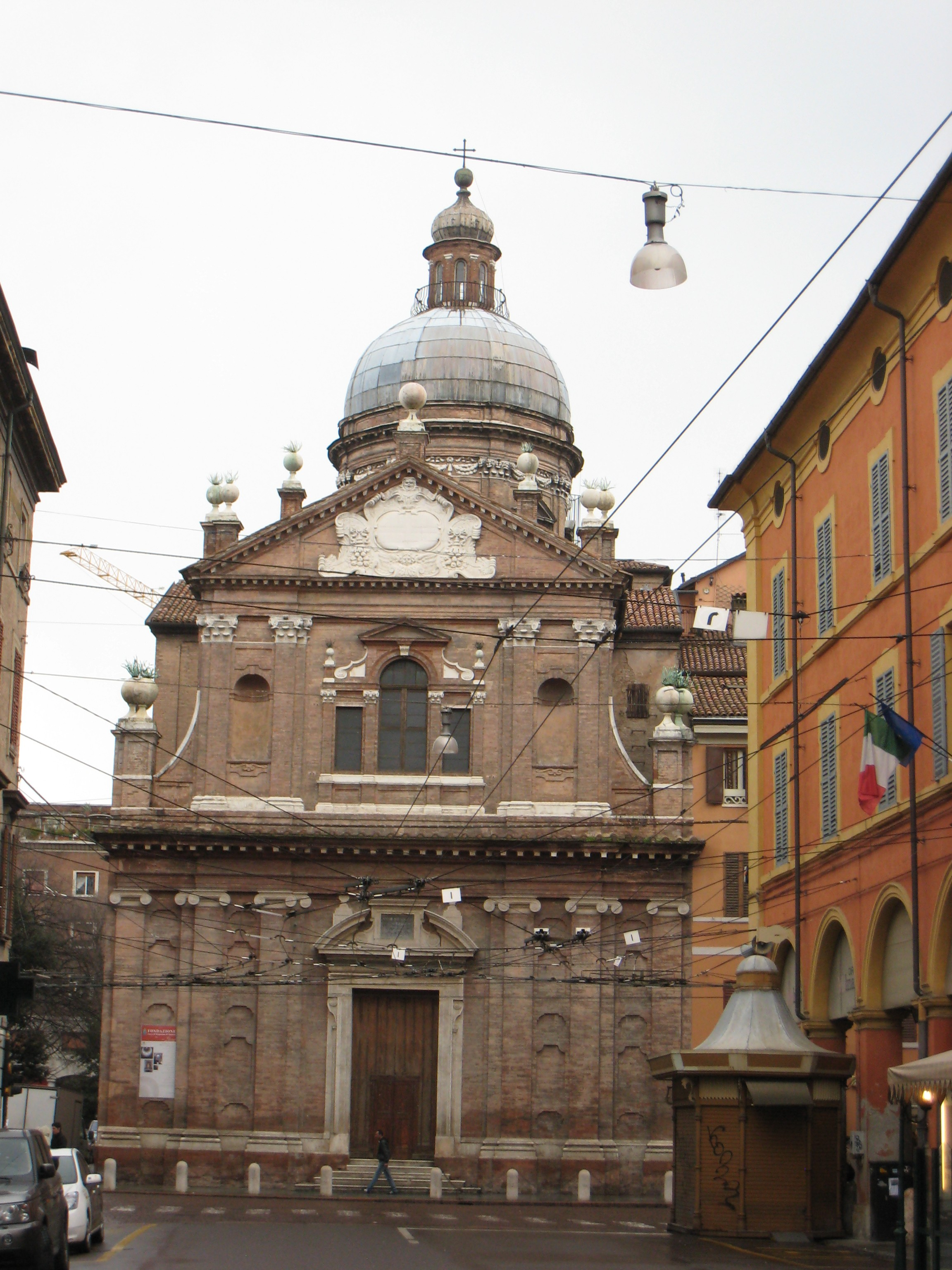
- Facade and Dome of Chiesa del Voto

Religion
- Affiliation: Catholic

Location
- Interactive map of: Votive Church; Chiesa del Voto (Italian)
- Coordinates: 44.6473°N 10.9254°E

Architecture
- Architect: Cristoforo Malagola
- Completed: 1634

The church of Chiesa del Voto or Votive Church of Modena is a Baroque style church in the city of Modena, Italy. It is located near the town center, and was built to give thanks for the cessation of the plague of 1630. Older texts cite a full name of the church of the Madonna Santissima del voto della Città.

== History ==
Work on the structure began in 1634, under the direction of Cristoforo Malagola, also called il Galaverna. The church is modeled after the church of San Salvatore in Bologna. The dome recalls the Basilica of the Basilica della Ghiara in Reggio.

Among the canvases in the church are those depicting the events of the Intercession during Plague by Ludovico Lana. The canvas has the Madonna beside St Roch and St Sebastian, two saints traditionally affiliated with healing from the plague, as well as Saint Homobonus, also a patron saint of the city.

The apse has two canvases, a Glory of the Virgin by Jacopo Consetti and a Glory of St Joseph by Francesco Stringa. Stringa also painted in the church a Madonna and Child with St Antony. An altarpiece depicting St Filomena was painted by Adeodato Malatesta.

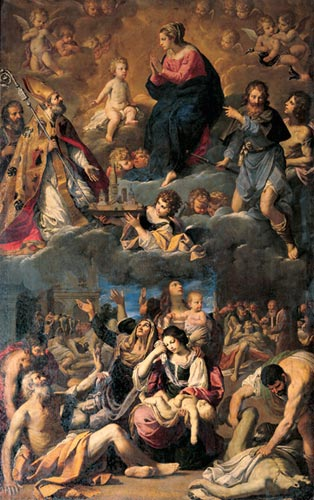
Virgin, child and saints intercede to stop the plague, by Ludovico Lana]

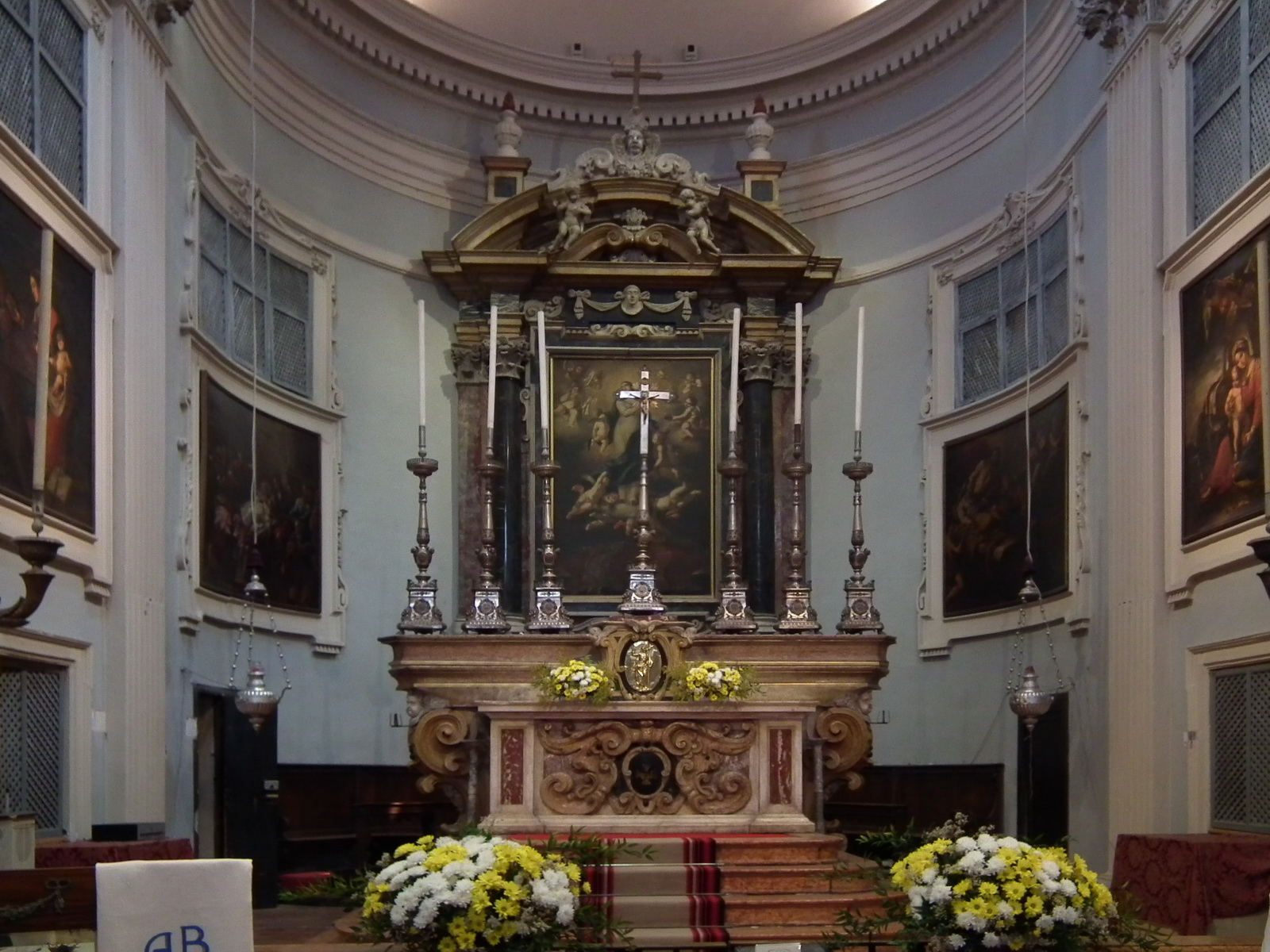

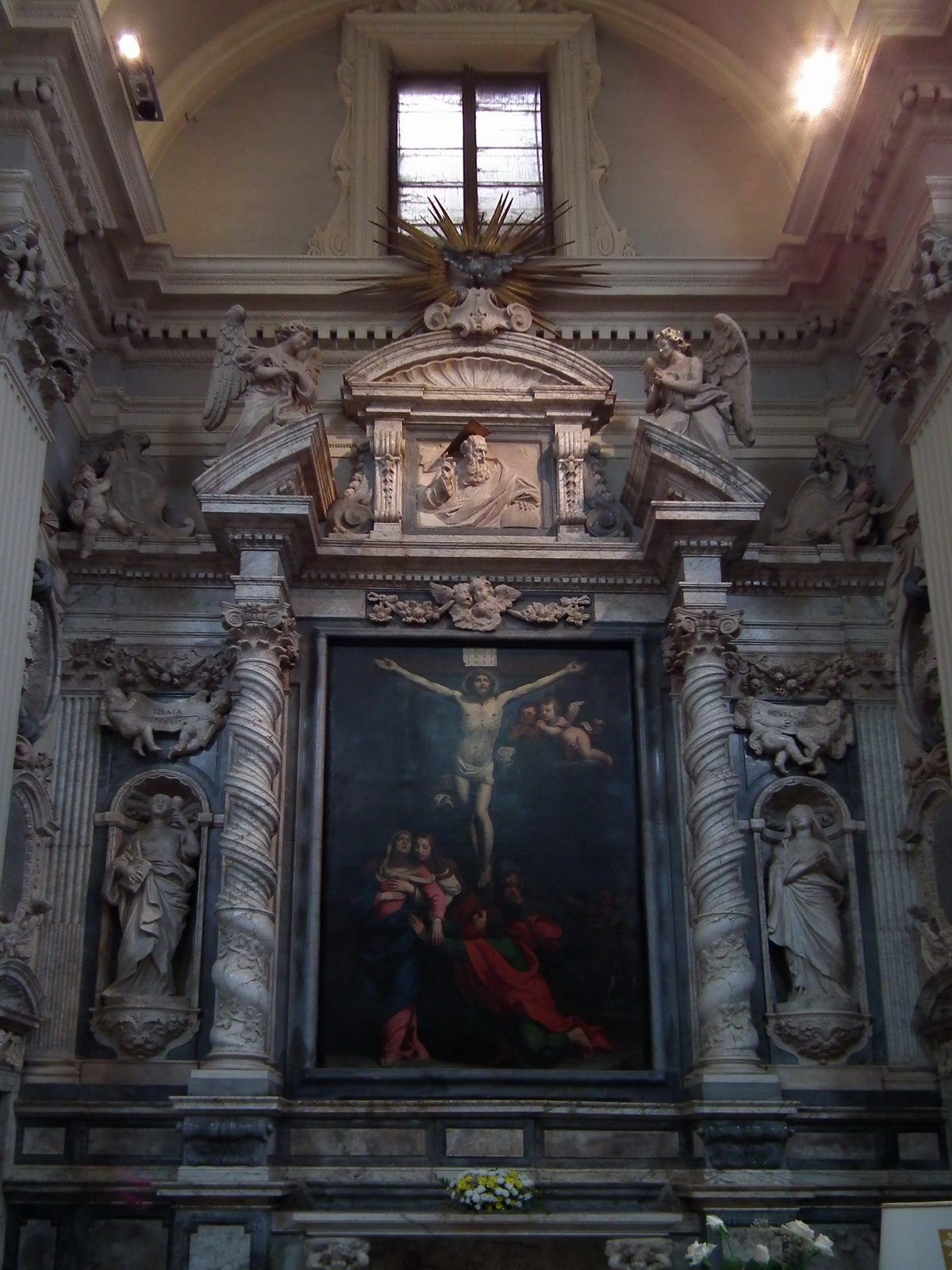
Crucifixion altarpiece also by Lana
