= Gian-Luca Oppo =

Italian physicist

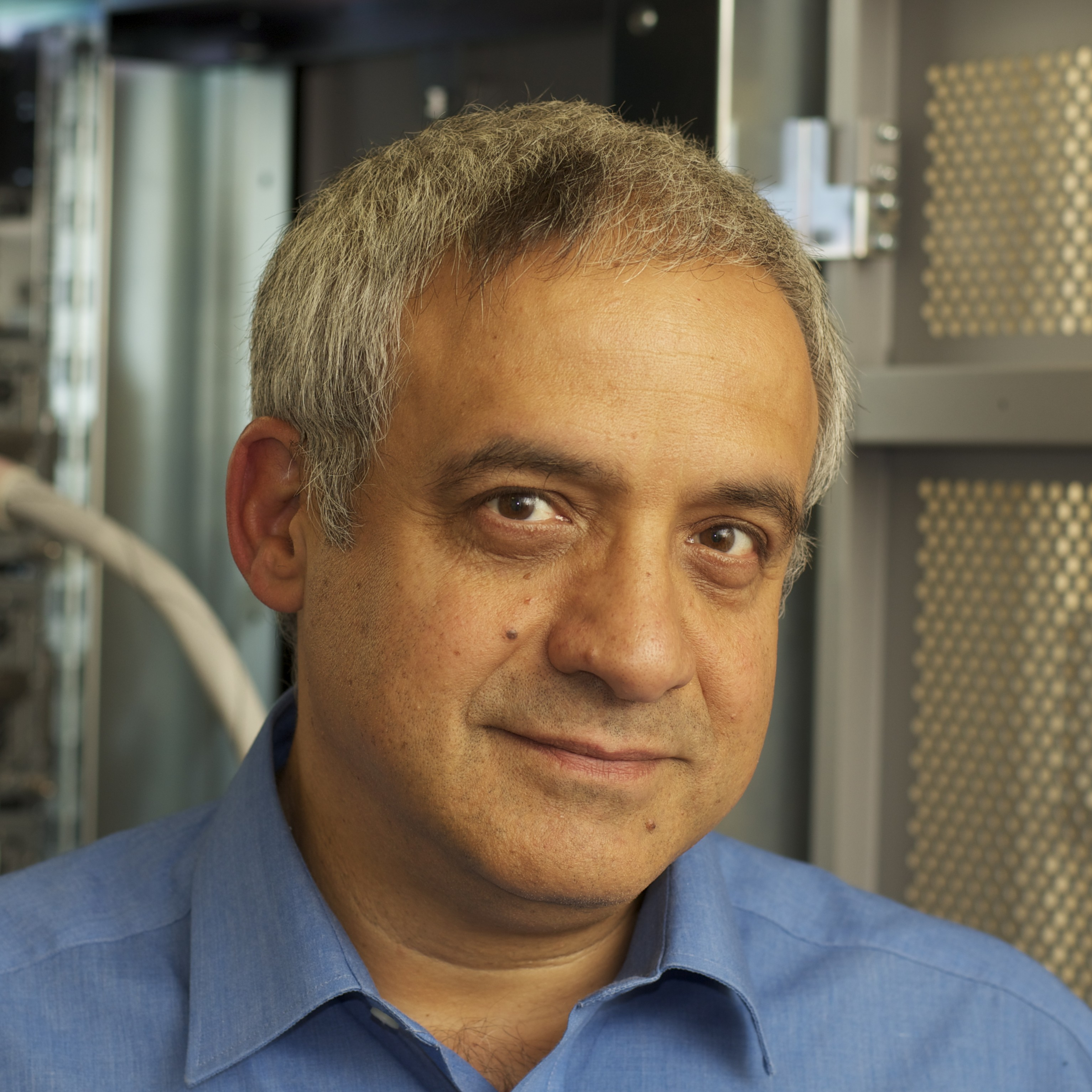
- Born: December 5, 1958 (age 67); Modena, Italy
- Education: University of Florence
- Scientific career
- Fields: Nonlinear optics; Laser physics
- Workplaces: University of Strathclyde; Côte d'Azur University; Drexel University; University of Toronto

Gian-Luca Oppo (born 5 December 1958) is an Italian physicist, known for his work in laser physics and nonlinear and quantum optics. Currently based in Glasgow, he holds the Chair of Natural Philosophy at the University of Strathclyde.

== Education and career ==
Oppo was born in Modena in 1958, and grew up in Lodi and Arezzo. He studied at the University of Florence and the National Institute of Optics, receiving his doctorate in physics in 1983 under the supervision of Tito Arecchi and Antonio Politi. He joined the University of Toronto in Canada in 1985 to work with Ray Kapral, then Drexel University in Philadelphia in 1987, where he worked alongside Lorenzo Narducci and Jorge Tredicce. After a short period at the University of Nice (now Côte d'Azur University) in 1989, he joined the Physics Department at the University of Strathclyde in Glasgow, Scotland, where he became Professor of Computational and Nonlinear Physics in 1998. Alongside Stephen Barnett and William Firth, he founded the Computational Nonlinear and Quantum Optics group, which was flagged 5* in the Research Assessment Exercise of 2001. His chair was supported by Silicon Graphics, Inc. from 2000 to 2005. Since 2015, Oppo has been the 1796 Freeland Chair in Natural Philosophy at Strathclyde.

== Honours and recognitions ==
In 2011, Oppo was awarded the Occhialini Medal and Prize from the Institute of Physics and the Italian Physical Society, for "novel insights into nonlinear and quantum optical phenomena, especially spatio-temporal phenomena, achieved through the development and application of powerful techniques for small-scale computing". He is a fellow of the Royal Society of Edinburgh, the Optical Society of America (now Optica), and the Institute of Physics.

== Selected publications ==
- Politi, A., Oppo, G.-L., & Badii, R. Coexistence of conservative and dissipative behavior in reversible dynamical systems. Physical Review A, 33(6), 4055-4060 (1986). Coexistence of conservative and dissipative behavior in reversible dynamical systems
- Narducci, L. M., Scully, M. O., Oppo, G.-L., Ru, P., & Tredicce, J. R. Spontaneous emission and absorption properties of a driven three-level system. Physical Review A, 42(3), 1630-1649 (1990). Spontaneous emission and absorption properties of a driven three-level system
- Oppo, G.-L., Brambilla, M., & Lugiato, L. A. Formation and evolution of roll patterns in optical parametric oscillators, Physical Review A, 49(3), 2028-2032 (1994). Formation and evolution of roll patterns in optical parametric oscillators
- Livi, R., Franzosi, R., & Oppo, G.-L. Self-Localization of Bose-Einstein condensates in optical lattices via boundary dissipation. Physical Review Letters, 97, 060401 (2006). Self-Localization of Bose-Einstein Condensates in Optical Lattices via Boundary Dissipation
- Bao, H., Cooper, A., Rowley, M., Di Lauro, L., Totero Gongora, J. S., Chu, S. T., Little, B. E., Oppo, G.-L., Morandotti, R., Moss, D. J., Wetzel, B., Peccianti, M., & Pasquazi, A. Laser cavity-soliton microcombs. Nature Photonics 13, 384-389 (2019). Laser cavity-soliton microcombs
- Oppo, G.-L. Computational physics applied to photonic devices. La Rivista del Nuovo Cimento 49, 1-74 (2026). Computational physics applied to photonic devices
