= Ludovico Lana =

Italian painter (c. 1597 – 1646)

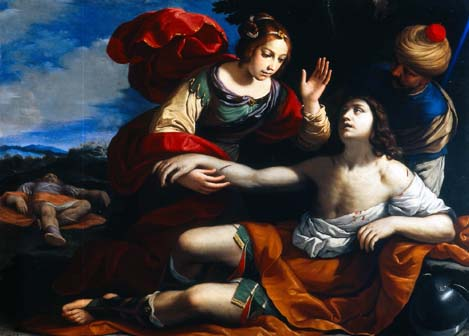
Ludovico Lana, Erminia and Tancredi, Italian

Ludovico Lana (c. 1597 – 1646) was an Italian painter of the Baroque period, mainly active in Modena, where he died in 1646. He is also known as Lodovico Lana. He was the director of the Accademia Ducale of Modena. He is said to have been born in Codigoro to a Ferrarese merchant, whose family was originally from Brescia. He appears to have trained with Scarsellino in Ferrara. He then spent some time in Bologna, where he may have worked under or learned the style of either Reni or Guercino.

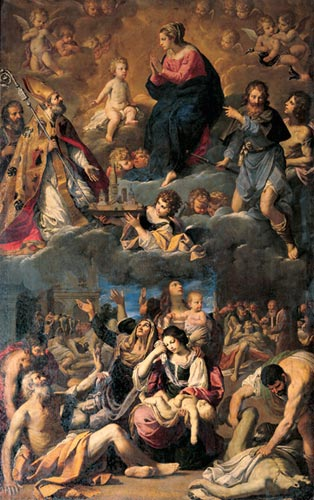
Altarpiece of the Plague

He helped decorate the Ducal Palace of Sassuolo. He painted an altarpiece for the Chiesa del Voto in Modena, depicting the Virgin Mary stopping the plague of 1630, which shows the town of Modena in low aerial view below the image of the Basilica of the Madonna della Ghiara. Below the virgin are pleading and dying citizens.

One of his pupils was Giovanni Vernulli.

== Sources ==
- Laderchi, Camillo (1856). La pittura ferrarese, memorie. p. 172.
- Hobbes, James R. (1849). Picture collector's manual; Dictionary of Painters. London: T. & W. Boone. pp. 148–151.
