= Modena =

City in Emilia-Romagna, Italy

Modena Mòdna (Emilian)
- Comune
- Comune di Modena
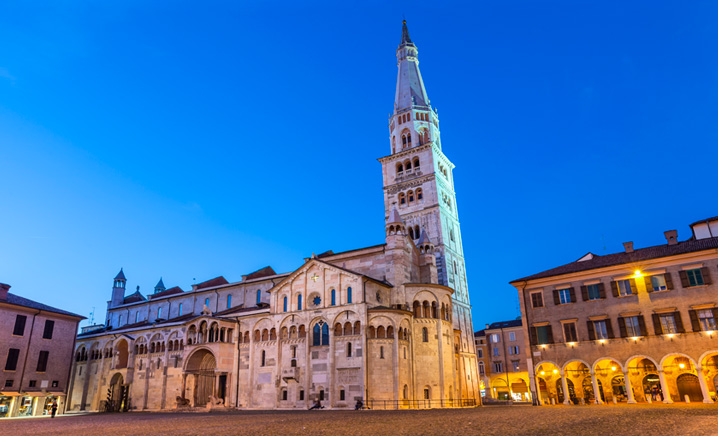
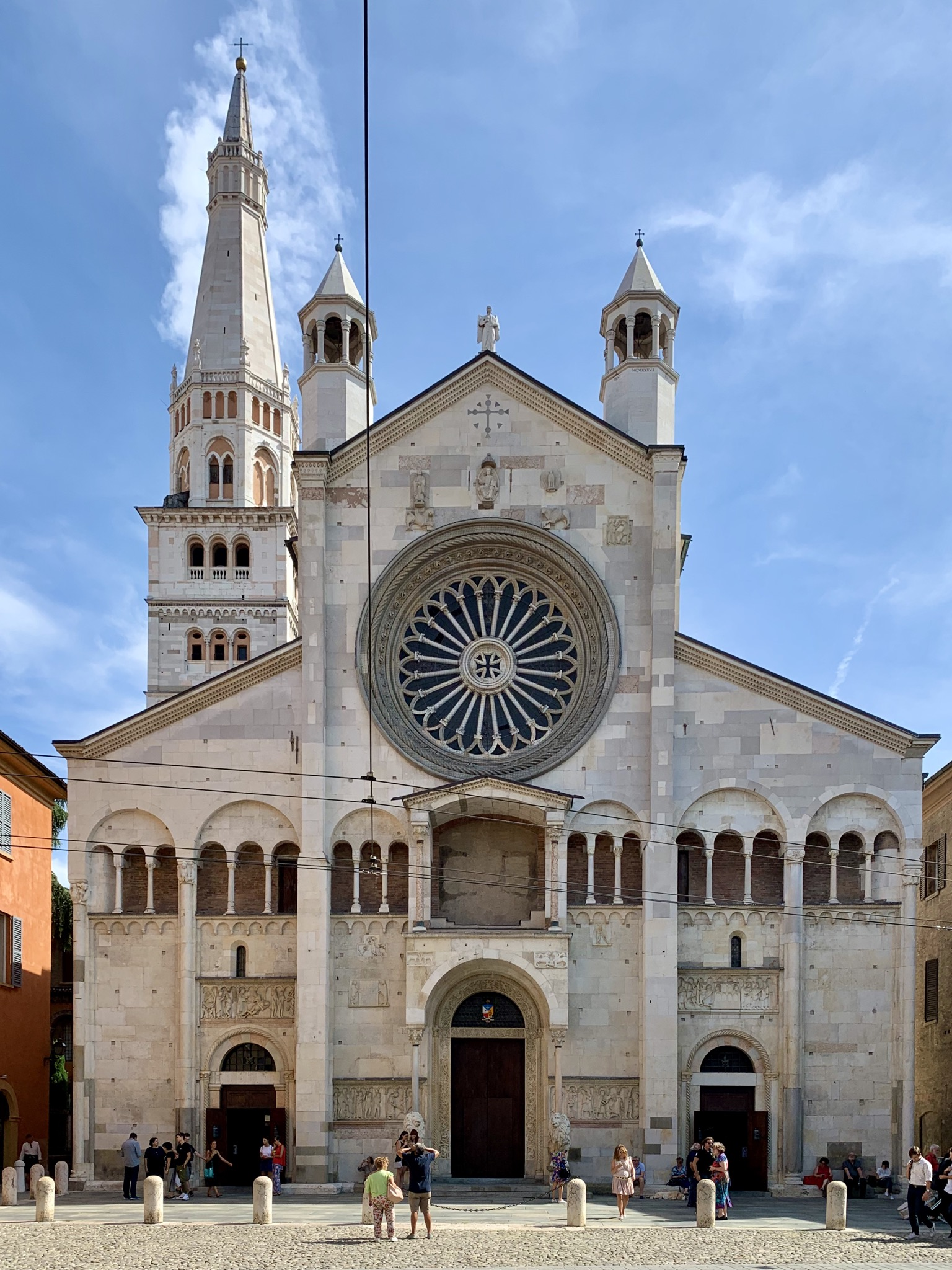
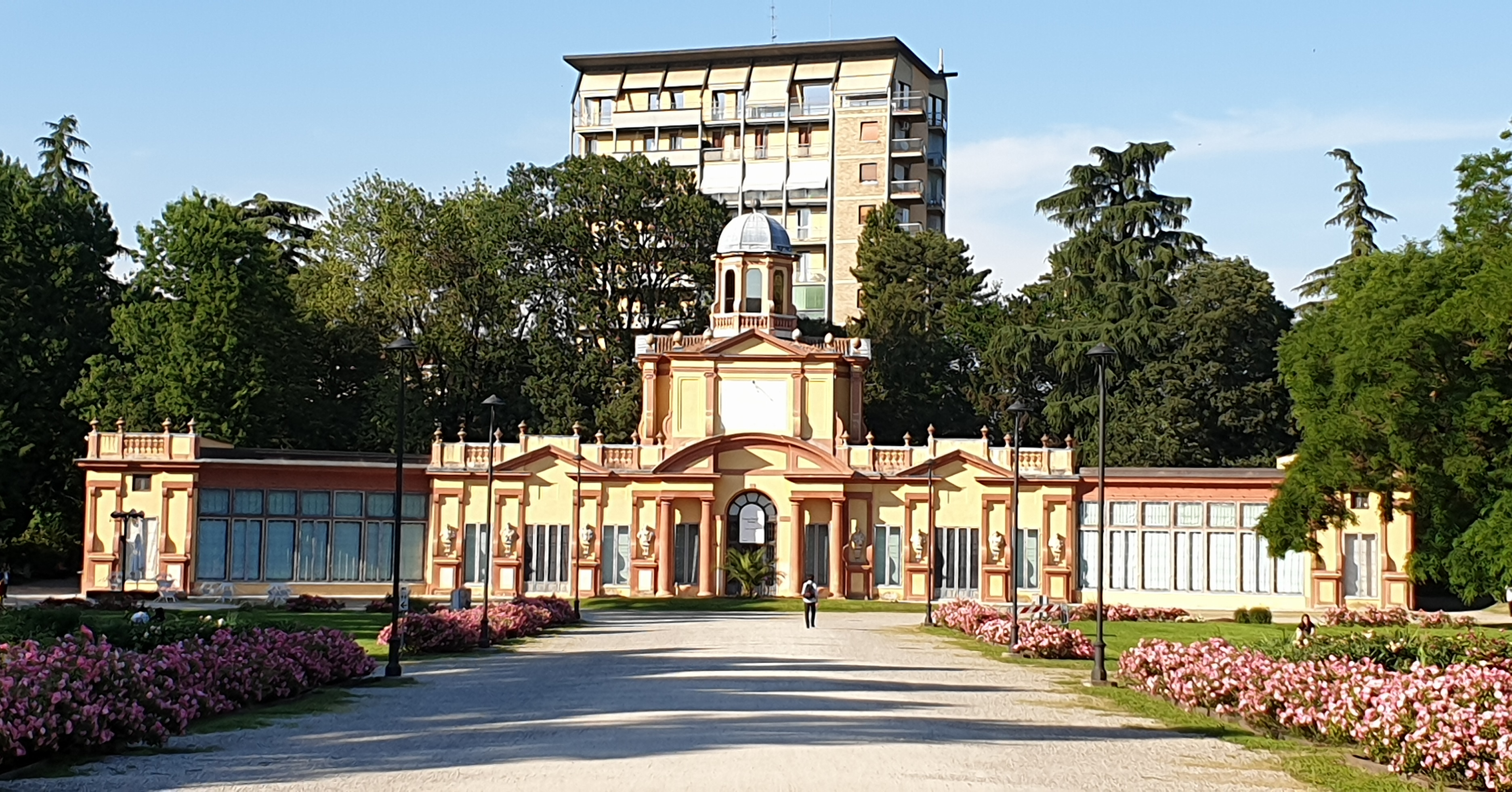
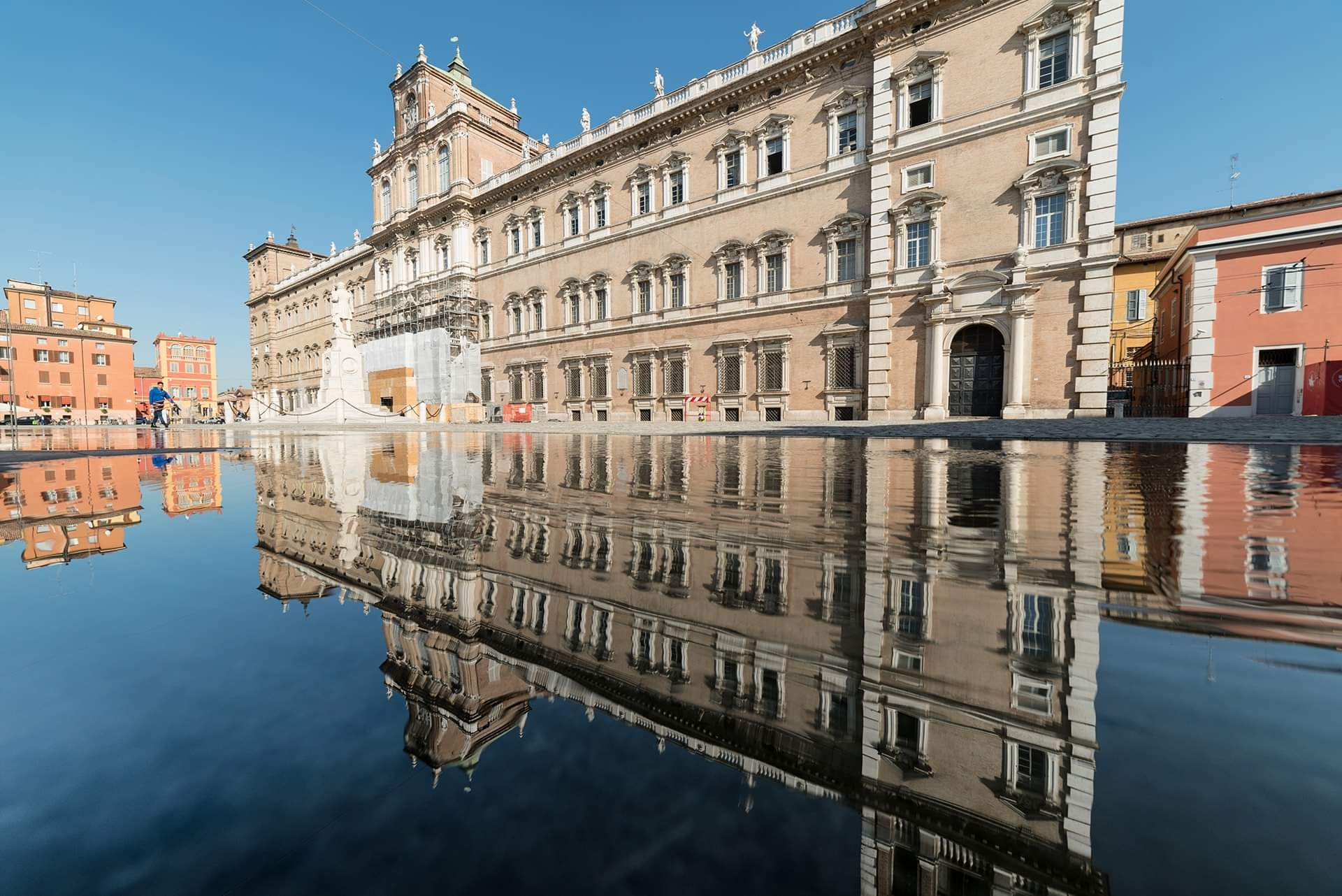
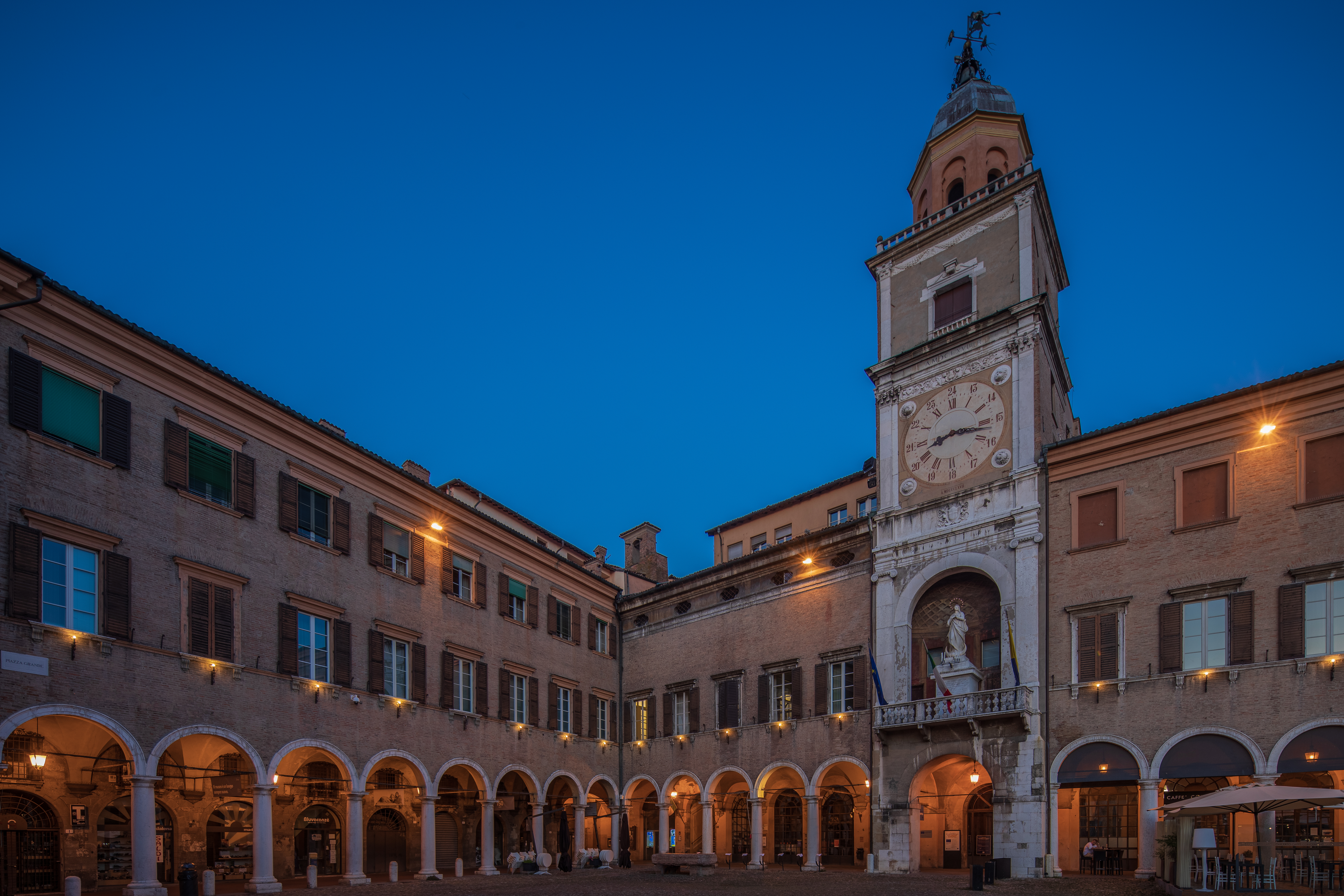
- Piazza Grande Duomo Giardini Ducali Estensi Ducal Palace Palazzo Comunale

- Flag Coat of arms

- Location within Italy Location within Emilia-Romagna
- Coordinates: 44°38′49″N 10°55′32″E
- Country: Italy
- Region: Emilia-Romagna
- Province: Modena (MO)
- Frazioni: Albareto, Baggiovara, Ca' Fusara, Cognento, Cittanova, Collegara, Ganaceto, Lesignana, Marzaglia, Navicello, Portile, San Damaso, San Donnino, Tre Olmi, Villanova

Government
  - Mayor: Massimo Mezzetti (Ind)

Area
  - Total: 183.19 km^{2} (70.73 sq mi)
- Elevation: 34 m (112 ft)

Population (2026)
  - Total: 184,361
  - Density: 1,006.4/km^{2} (2,606.5/sq mi)
- Demonym: Modenese

Languages
  - Official Language: Italian
  - Regional Language: Emilian
- Time zone: UTC+1 (CET)
  - Summer (DST): UTC+2 (CEST)
- Postal code: 41121-41126
- Dialing code: 059
- ISTAT code: 036023
- Patron saint: San Geminiano
- Saint day: 31 January
- Website: Official website

Modena (UK: /ˈmɒdɪnə/, US: /ˈmoʊd-/; Italian: [ˈmɔːdena]; Modenese: Mòdna [ˈmɔdnɐ]; Etruscan: Mutna; Latin: Mutina) is a city and comune (municipality) on the south side of the Po Valley, in the Province of Modena, in the region of Emilia-Romagna in northern Italy. With a population of 184,361 as of 2026, it is the 20th-largest city in Italy.

A town, and seat of an archbishop, it is known for its car industry since the factories of the famous Italian upper-class sports car makers Ferrari, De Tomaso, Lamborghini, Pagani and Maserati are, or were, located there and all, except Lamborghini, (having their factory in Sant'Agata Bolognese), have headquarters in the city or nearby. One of Ferrari's cars, the 360 Modena, was named after the town itself. Ferrari's production plant and Formula One team Scuderia Ferrari are based in Maranello south of the city.

The University of Modena, founded in 1175 and expanded by Francesco II d'Este in 1686, focuses on economics, medicine and law, and is the second oldest athenaeum in Italy. Italian military officers are trained at the Military Academy of Modena, and partly housed in the Baroque Ducal Palace. The Biblioteca Estense houses historical volumes and 3,000 manuscripts. The Cathedral of Modena, the Torre della Ghirlandina and Piazza Grande are a UNESCO World Heritage Site since 1997. Modena is also known in culinary circles for its production of balsamic vinegar.

Famous Modenesi include Mary of Modena, the Queen consort of England and Scotland; operatic tenor Luciano Pavarotti and soprano Mirella Freni, born in Modena itself; Enzo Ferrari, eponymous founder of the Ferrari motor company; Catholic priest Gabriele Amorth; chef Massimo Bottura; comics artist Franco Bonvicini; the band Modena City Ramblers and singer-songwriter Francesco Guccini, who lived here for several decades.

== History ==
=== Ancient times ===
The territory around Modena (Latin: Mutina, Etruscan: Mutna) was inhabited by the Villanovans in the Iron Age, and later by Ligurian tribes, Etruscans, and the Gaulish Boii (the settlement itself being Etruscan). Although the exact date of its foundation is unknown, it is known that it was already in existence in the 3rd century BC, for in 218 BC, during Hannibal's invasion of Italy, the Boii revolted and laid siege to the city. Livy described it as a fortified citadel where Roman magistrates took shelter. The outcome of the siege is not known, but the city was most likely abandoned after Hannibal's arrival. Mutina was refounded as a Roman colony in 183 BC, to be used as a military base by Marcus Aemilius Lepidus, causing the Ligurians to sack it in 177 BC. Nonetheless, it was rebuilt, and quickly became the most important centre in Cisalpine Gaul, both because of its strategic importance and because it was on an important crossroads between Via Aemilia and the road going to Verona.

In the 1st century BC, Mutina was besieged twice. The first siege was by Pompey in 78 BC, when Mutina was defended by Marcus Junius Brutus (a populist leader, not to be confused with his son, Caesar's best known assassin). The city eventually surrendered out of hunger, and Brutus fled, only to be slain in Regium Lepidi. In the civil war following Caesar's assassination, the city was besieged again, this time by Mark Antony, in 44 BC, and defended by Decimus Junius Brutus. Octavian relieved the city with the help of the Senate (see: Battle of Mutina).

Cicero called it Mutina splendidissima ('most beautiful Mutina') in his Philippics (44 BC). Until the 3rd century AD, it kept its position as the most important city in the newly formed province Aemilia, but the fall of the Empire brought Mutina down with it, as it was used as a military base both against the barbarians and in the civil wars. It is said that Mutina was never sacked by Attila, for a dense fog hid it (a miracle said to be provided by Saint Geminianus, bishop and patron of Modena), but it was eventually buried by a great flood in the 7th century and abandoned.

In December 2008, Italian researchers discovered the pottery center where the oil lamps that lit the ancient Roman empire were made. Evidence of the pottery workshops emerged in Modena, during construction work to build a residential complex near the ancient walls of the city. "We found a large ancient Roman dumping filled with pottery scraps. There were vases, bottles, bricks, but most of all, hundreds of oil lamps, each bearing their maker's name", Donato Labate, the archaeologist in charge of the dig, stated.

=== Middle Ages ===
Cathedral, Torre Civica and Piazza Grande, Modena
UNESCO World Heritage Site
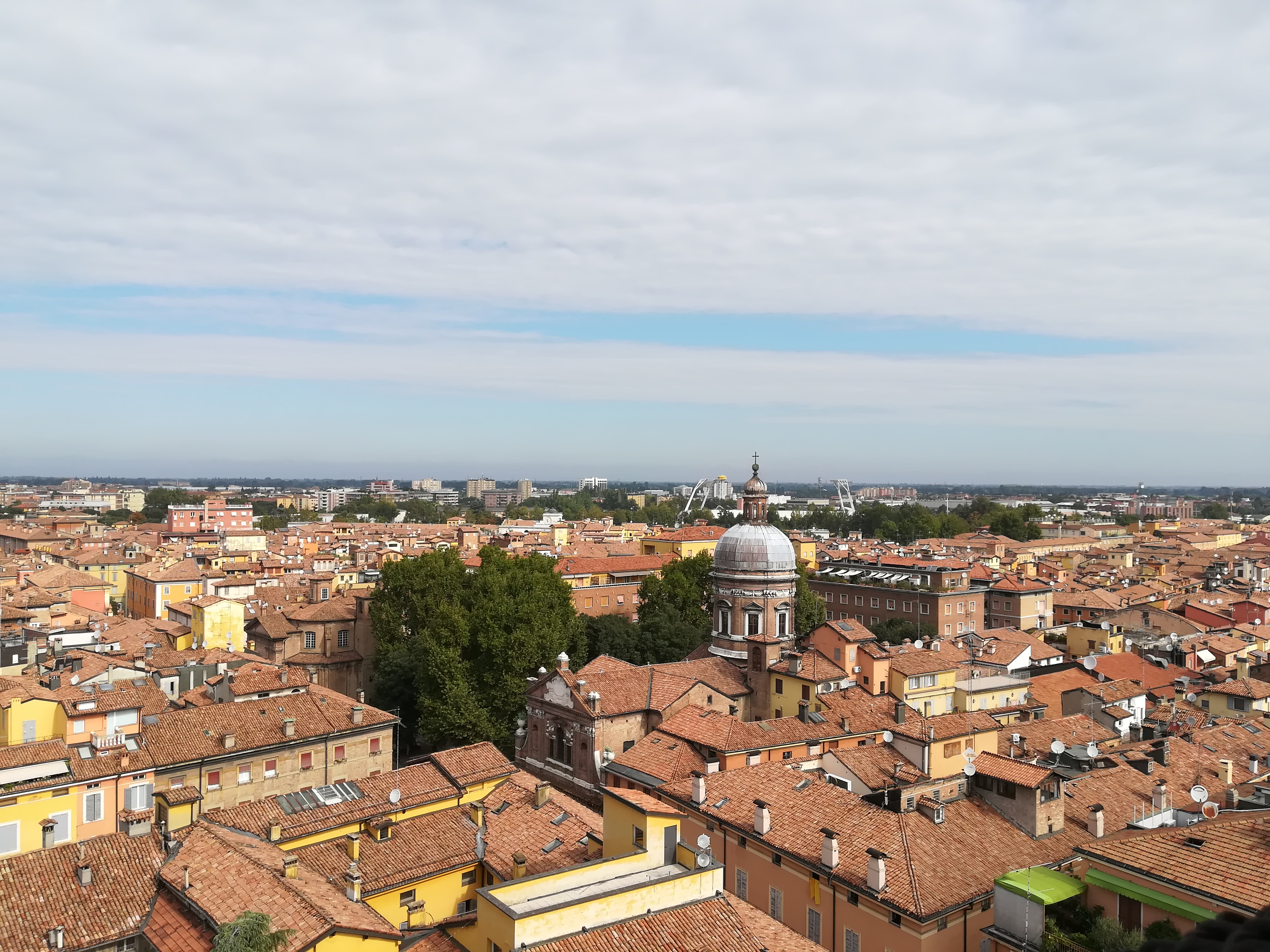
- Panorama of Modena
- Interactive map of Cathedral, Torre Civica and Piazza Grande, Modena
- Criteria: Cultural: i, ii, iii, iv
- Reference: 827
- Inscription: 1997 (21st Session)

Its exiles founded a new city a few miles to the northwest, still represented by the village of Cittanova (literally "new city"). About the end of the 9th century, Modena was restored and refortified by its bishop, Ludovicus. At about this time the Song of the Watchmen of Modena was composed. Later the city was part of the possessions of the Countess Matilda of Tuscany, becoming a free comune starting from the 12th century. In the wars between Emperor Frederick II and Pope Gregory IX Modena sided with the emperor.

The Este family were identified as lords of Modena from 1288 (Obizzo d'Este). After the death of Obizzo's successor (Azzo VIII, in 1308) the comune reasserted itself, but by 1336 the Este family was permanently in power. Under Borso d'Este, Modena was made a duchy.

=== Renaissance and modern ===
Enlarged and fortified by Ercole II, it was made the primary ducal residence when Ferrara, the main Este seat, fell to the Pope in 1598. Francesco I d'Este, Duke of Modena (1629–1658) built the citadel and began the palace, which was largely embellished by Francesco II. In the 18th century, Rinaldo d'Este was twice driven from his city by French invasions, and Francesco III built many of Modena's public buildings, but the Este pictures were sold and many of them wound up in Dresden. Ercole III died in exile at Treviso, having refused Napoleonic offers of compensation when Modena was made part of the Napoleonic Cispadane Republic. His only daughter, Maria Beatrice d'Este, married Ferdinand I, Archduke of Austria-Este, son of Empress Maria Theresa of Austria; and in 1814 their eldest son, Francis IV, received back the estates of the Este. Quickly, in 1816, he dismantled the fortifications and began Modena's years under Austrian rule.

His son Francis V was considered a just ruler, and famously tended the victims of war and cholera with his own hands. However, he too had to face yet more foreign-inspired revolutions and was temporarily expelled from Modena in the Revolutions of 1848. He was restored, amidst wide popular acclaim, by Austrian troops. Ten years later, on 20 August 1859, the revolutionaries again invaded (this time the Piedmontese), annexing Modena to the revolutionary Savoyard Kingdom of Italy.

== Geography ==
Modena lies on the Pianura Padana, and is bounded by the two rivers Secchia and Panaro, both affluents of the Po River. Their presence is symbolized by the Two Rivers Fountain in the city's center, by Giuseppe Graziosi. The city is connected to the Panaro by the Naviglio channel. The Apennines begin some 10 kilometres (6 miles) from the city, to the south. The comune is divided into four circoscrizioni. These are:

- Centro storico (Historical Center, San Cataldo)
- Crocetta (San Lazzaro-East Modena, Crocetta)
- Buon Pastore (Buon Pastore, Sant'Agnese, San Damaso)
- San Faustino (S.Faustino-Saliceta San Giuliano, Madonnina-Quattro Ville)

=== Climate ===
Modena has a humid subtropical climate, with continental influences. It has an average annual precipitation of 809 millimetres (31.9 in). Summers are hot and winters are cool, with snowfall. This climate is described by the Köppen climate classification as Cfa.

Climate data for Modena (1991–2020)
Month	Jan	Feb	Mar	Apr	May	Jun	Jul	Aug	Sep	Oct	Nov	Dec	Year
Record high °C (°F)	25.3 (77.5)	22.4 (72.3)	26.7 (80.1)	30.8 (87.4)	35.2 (95.4)	37.8 (100.0)	39.3 (102.7)	39.5 (103.1)	33.9 (93.0)	29.4 (84.9)	22.8 (73.0)	17.2 (63.0)	39.5 (103.1)
Mean daily maximum °C (°F)	6.6 (43.9)	9.3 (48.7)	14.6 (58.3)	18.6 (65.5)	23.6 (74.5)	28.2 (82.8)	30.8 (87.4)	30.5 (86.9)	25.1 (77.2)	18.7 (65.7)	12.1 (53.8)	7.1 (44.8)	18.8 (65.8)
Daily mean °C (°F)	3.5 (38.3)	5.2 (41.4)	9.7 (49.5)	13.6 (56.5)	18.3 (64.9)	22.7 (72.9)	25.1 (77.2)	24.9 (76.8)	19.9 (67.8)	14.7 (58.5)	9.0 (48.2)	4.2 (39.6)	14.2 (57.6)
Mean daily minimum °C (°F)	0.4 (32.7)	1.1 (34.0)	4.8 (40.6)	8.7 (47.7)	13.1 (55.6)	17.2 (63.0)	19.3 (66.7)	19.3 (66.7)	14.8 (58.6)	10.7 (51.3)	5.9 (42.6)	1.3 (34.3)	9.7 (49.5)
Record low °C (°F)	−10.0 (14.0)	−16.0 (3.2)	−6.8 (19.8)	−3.0 (26.6)	3.6 (38.5)	7.6 (45.7)	7.0 (44.6)	9.0 (48.2)	6.0 (42.8)	−3.6 (25.5)	−5.0 (23.0)	−11.4 (11.5)	−16.0 (3.2)
Average precipitation mm (inches)	33.5 (1.32)	51.6 (2.03)	44.5 (1.75)	63.0 (2.48)	64.0 (2.52)	61.7 (2.43)	35.3 (1.39)	40.4 (1.59)	55.6 (2.19)	75.3 (2.96)	75.3 (2.96)	54.7 (2.15)	654.9 (25.77)
Average precipitation days (≥ 1.0 mm)	5	6	5	8	6	5	3	4	5	8	8	6	69
Source 1: Arpae Emilia-Romagna
Source 2: Climi e viaggi (precipitation days)

== Demographics ==
Historical population
Year	Pop.	±%
1861	52,629	—
1871	56,995	+8.3%
1881	57,520	+0.9%
1901	63,012	+9.5%
1911	71,922	+14.1%
1921	81,590	+13.4%
1931	89,741	+10.0%
1936	96,337	+7.4%
1951	111,364	+15.6%
1961	139,183	+25.0%
1971	171,072	+22.9%
1981	180,312	+5.4%
1991	176,990	−1.8%
2001	175,502	−0.8%
2011	179,149	+2.1%
2021	184,971	+3.2%
Source: ISTAT

As of 2026, the population is 184,361, of which 48.9% are male, and 51.1% are female. Minors make up 14.7% of the population, and seniors make up 25.0%.

=== Immigration ===
As of 2025, immigrants make up 18.3% of the total population. The 5 largest foreign countries of birth are Morocco, Albania, Moldova, the Philippines, and Ghana.

Foreign population by country of birth (2025)
Country of birth	Population
Morocco	3,370
Albania	2,628
Moldova	2,583
Philippines	2,306
Ghana	2,125
Ukraine	2,110
Romania	1,931
Tunisia	1,515
Bangladesh	1,029
Nigeria	973
China	841
Turkey	747
Pakistan	706
Peru	608
Poland	496

== Administration ==
From 1946 to 1992, Modena had a series of Communist mayors. From the 1990s, the city has been governed by center-left coalitions. The legislative body of the municipality (comune) is the City Council (Consiglio Comunale), which is composed by 32 members elected (jointly with the mayor) by the citizens every five years. Modena's executive body is the City Committee (Giunta Comunale), which is composed by 9 assessors (appointed and dismissed by the mayor), of which one is deputy-mayor, and the mayor. The mayor from 2019 to 2024 of Modena was Gian Carlo Muzzarelli, a member of the Democratic Party.

== Sights ==
=== Ducal Palace ===
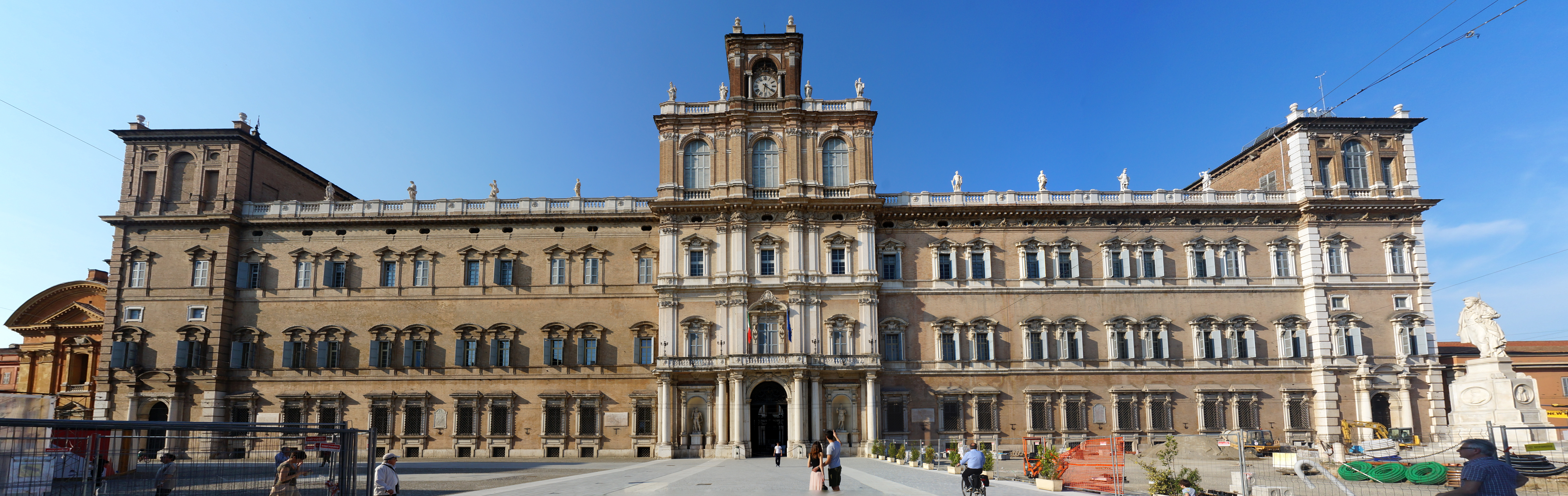
Palazzo Ducale of Modena, June 2015

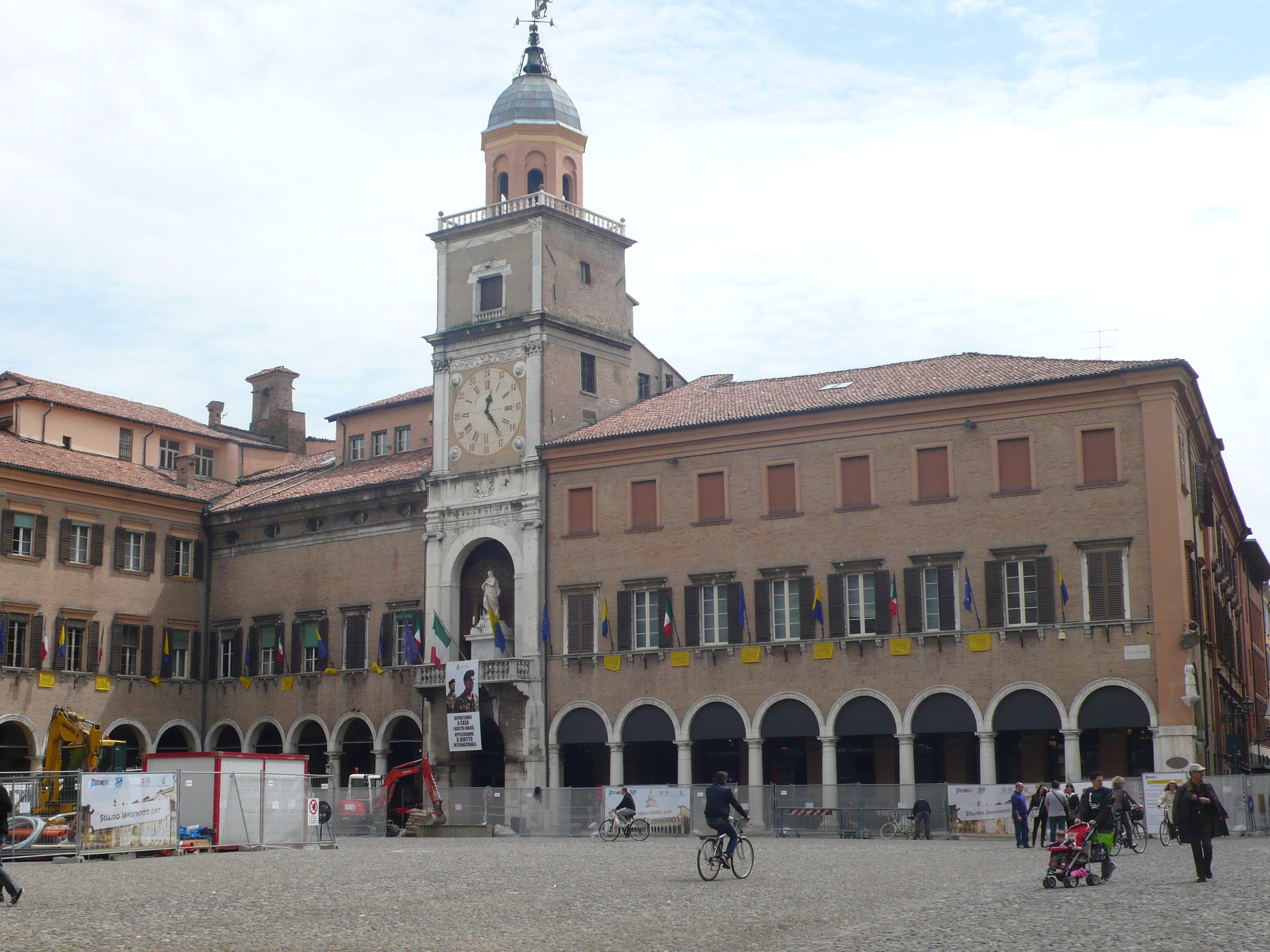
Palazzo Comunale, Modena town hall

Façade of the Duomo di Modena, or Cathedral of Santa Maria Assunta and Saint Geminianus

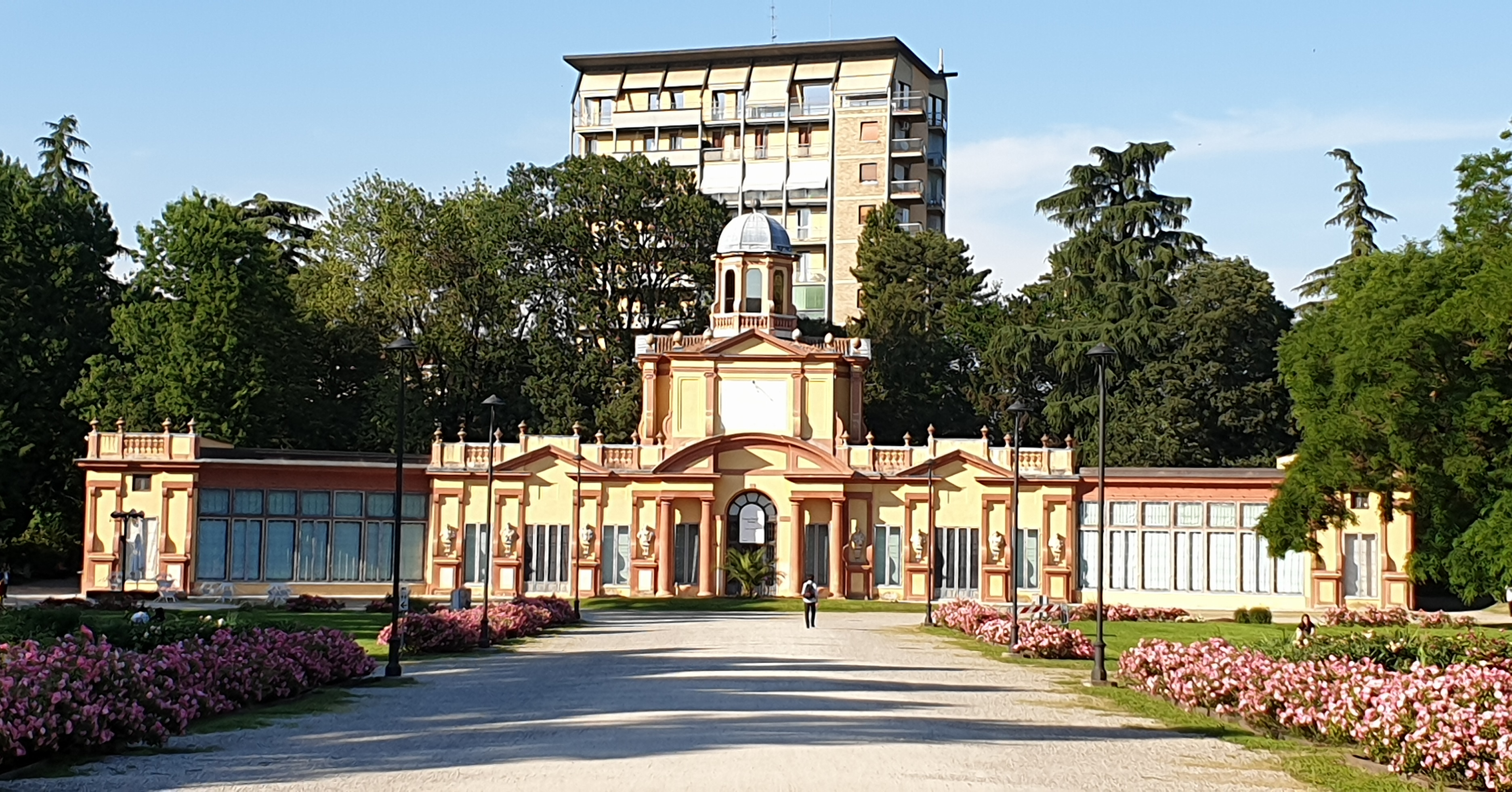
House of Este Ducal Gardens

The Ducal Palace of Modena, initiated by Francesco I d'Este in 1634 and completed by Francis V, was the seat of the Este court from the 17th to 19th century. The palace occupies the site of the former Este Castle, once located in the periphery of the city. Although generally credited to Bartolomeo Avanzini, it has been suggested that advice and guidance in the design process had been sought from the contemporary luminaries, Cortona, Bernini, and Borromini.

The Palace currently houses the Accademia Militare di Modena, the Military Museum and a precious library.

The Palace has a Baroque façade, from which the Honour Court (where the military ceremonies are held) and the Honour Staircase can be accessed. The Central Hall has a frescoed ceiling with the 17th-century Incoronation of Bradamante by Marco Antonio Franceschini. The Salottino d'Oro ("Golden Hall"), covered with gilted removable panels, was used by Duke Francis III as his main cabinet of work.

=== Town Hall ===
Facing the Piazza Grande (a UNESCO World Heritage Site), the Town Hall of Modena was put together in the 17th and 18th centuries from several pre-existing edifices built from 1046 as municipal offices.

It is characterized by a Clock Tower (Torre dell'Orologio, late 15th century), once paired with another tower (Torre Civica) demolished after an earthquake in 1671. In the interior, noteworthy is the Sala del Fuoco ("Fire Hall"), with a painted frieze by Niccolò dell'Abbate (1546) portraying famous characters from Ancient Rome against a typical Emilia background. The Camerino dei Confirmati ("Chamber of the Confirmed") houses one of the symbols of the city, the Secchia Rapita, a bucket kept in memory of the victorious Battle of Zappolino (1325) against Bologna. This relic inspired the poem of the same title by Alessandro Tassoni. Another relic from the Middle Ages in Modena is the Preda Ringadora, a rectangular marble stone next to the palace porch, used as a speakers' platform, and the statue called La Bonissima ("The Very Good"): the latter, portraying a female figure, was erected in the square in 1268 and later installed over the porch.

=== The Cathedral and the Ghirlandina ===
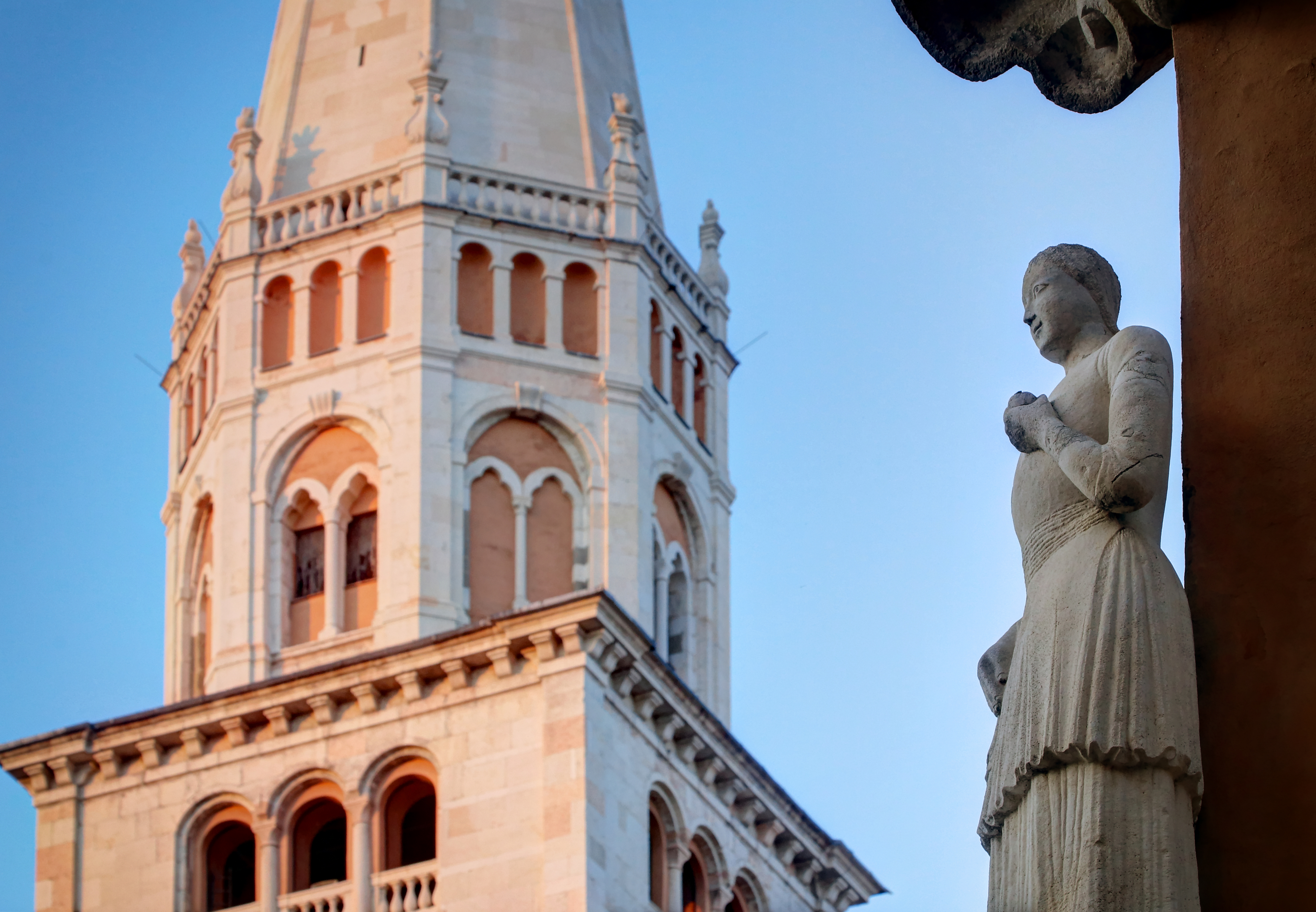
View from Piazza Grande with detail of the statue of La Bonissima and the Ghirlandina tower in the background

The Cathedral of Modena and the annexed campanile are a UNESCO World Heritage Site. Begun under the direction of the Countess Matilda of Tuscany with its first stone laid 6 June 1099 and its crypt ready for the city's patron, Saint Geminianus, and consecrated only six years later, the Duomo of Modena was finished in 1184. The building of a great cathedral in this flood-prone ravaged former center of Arianism was an act of urban renewal in itself, and an expression of the flood of piety that motivated the contemporary First Crusade. Unusually, the master builder's name, Lanfranco, was celebrated in his own day: the city's chronicler expressed the popular confidence in the master-mason from Como, Lanfranco: by God's mercy the man was found (inventus est vir).

The sculptor Wiligelmus who directed the mason's yard was praised in the plaque that commemorated the founding. The program of the sculpture is not lost in a welter of detail: the wild dangerous universe of the exterior is mediated by the Biblical figures of the portals leading to the Christian world of the interior. In Wiligelmus' sculpture at Modena, the human body takes on a renewed physicality it had lost in the schematic symbolic figures of previous centuries. At the east end, three apses reflect the division of the body of the cathedral into nave and wide aisles with their bold, solid masses. Modena's Duomo inspired campaigns of cathedral and abbey building in emulation through the valley of the Po.

The Gothic campanile (1224–1319) is called Torre della Ghirlandina from the bronze garland surrounding the weathercock.

=== Other churches ===
- San Vincenzo: erected in 17th century over a prior 13th-century church. The original design was by Paolo Reggiano, but completed by Bernardo Castagnini, probably helped by the young Guarino Guarini. The interior contains frescoes by Sigismondo Caula portraying episodes of the Lives of Saints Vincent and Cajetan. The dome was destroyed during World War II. This church houses the funerary monuments of the Dukes of Este.
- Santa Maria della Pomposa: also known as Aedes Muratoriana, is probably the oldest religious church in town, documented as early as 1135. Little remains of the original medieval temple. Construction of the present church is mainly due to Ludovico Antonio Muratori, the parish priest (1716–1750), who rebuilt it from the ground.
- San Giovanni Decollato: church of St. John Baptist Beheaded built in the 16th century over a pre-existing temple dedicated to St Michael, and modified in 18th century.
- Sant'Agostino: 14th-century church of St Augustine, largely renovated in 1663 for the funeral of Alfonso IV d'Este. The sober original structure was embellished with 17th-century stuccoes and a panelled ceiling. The most notable artwork is the Deposition (1476) by the Modenese Antonio Begarelli, once in the church of San Giovanni Battista. Traces of a 14th-century fresco by Tommaso da Modena can still be seen.
- San Francesco: construction of the church of St Francis begun in 1224 by the Franciscans, and not finished for two centuries. The Gothic-style church houses one of Begarelli's masterworks, a Deposition of Christ made up of thirteen statues.
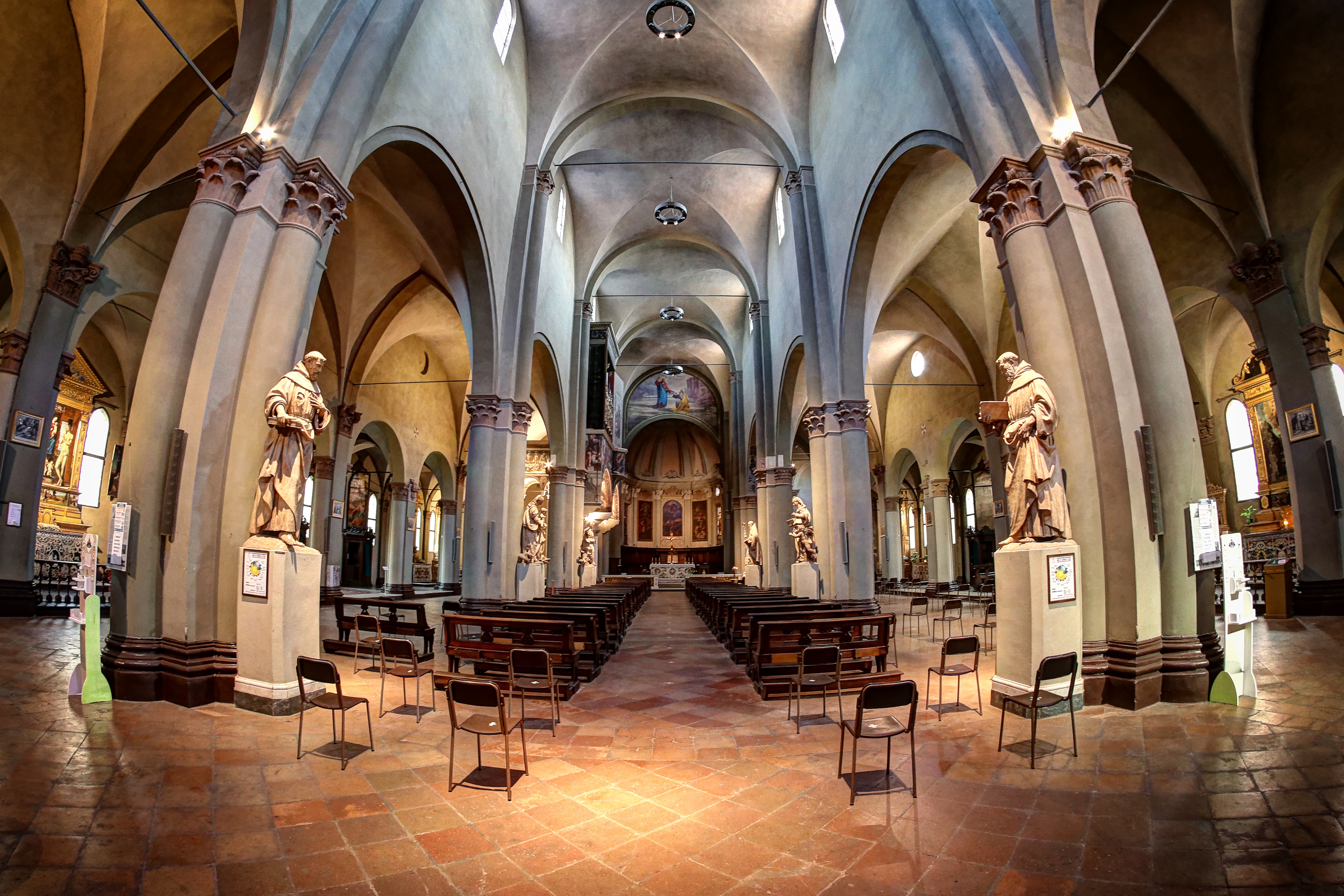
- Chiesa di San Pietro, Modena
  San Pietro: church erected, according to tradition, over the temple of Jupiter Capitolinus. The current Renaissance-style edifice is from 1476, built next to a Benedictine abbey founded in 996 outside the city walls; the church is among the few 15th-century structures of this style in Modena. The interior has a 15th-century organ and numerous terracotta works by Begarelli. The campanile was built in 1629.
- San Giorgio: church of St George, and also known as the Sanctuary of the Blessed Virgin Helper of the Modenese People. The church boasts a venerated image of the Madonna as a main altarpiece. The main altar (1666) was built with polychrome marbles by Antonio Loraghi. The layout is that of a Greek cross, and was erected in 1647.
- San Bartolomeo, Modena
- Chiesa del Voto: Votive Church erected after the cessation of the Plague of 1630.

Modena Synagogue

=== Synagogue ===
- The Synagogue, opposite the Palazzo Comunale, was built by the Jewish community of Modena in Lombardesque style and inaugurated in 1873.

=== Other sights ===
- Mercato Albinelli, a historical covered market founded in 1931
- Orto Botanico dell'Università di Modena e Reggio Emilia, a botanical garden
- San Cataldo Cemetery, designed by avant-gardist Italian architect Aldo Rossi (1971–1997)
- Home (museum) of Luciano Pavarotti

== Culture ==
=== Museums ===
==== Museum Palace ====
The Museum Palace, on the St. Augustine square, is an example of civil architecture from the Este period, built as a Hostel for the poor, together with the nearby Hospital in the late 18th century. Today it houses the main museums of Modena:

- Estense Gallery, with works by Tintoretto, Paolo Veronese, Guido Reni, Correggio, Cosmé Tura and brothers Annibale and Agostino Carracci. The most famous works are the two portraits of Francis I d'Este, a sculpture by Gian Lorenzo Bernini and a canvas by Diego Velázquez.
- Estense Library, one of the most important libraries in Italy.
- Museum of Medieval and Modern Art.
- Municipal Museum of Risorgimento.
- Este Headstones Museum.
- Roman Lapidary Museum.
- Graziosi Gallery of Plaster Casts.
- City Museum of Archaeology and Ethnology.

The Estense Gallery and Library have reopened on 29 May 2015 after the earthquake of 2012. The Gallery has been completely restored but some pieces are still damaged and thus cannot be seen.

==== Museums of the Cathedral ====
Opened for the Great Jubilee in 2000, the Museum of the Cathedral houses a rich collection of artistic heritage, in particular liturgical ornaments and furnishings. Apart from the finds of the cathedral building site by Wiligelmus and Lanfranco, such as romanesque metopes and roof decorations, in the Lapidary there are also reliefs, sculptures and inscriptions of the Roman, Medieval and Renaissance era found in the cathedral area during the restoration works between the 19th and the 20th century.

==== Museum Enzo Ferrari ====
Inaugurated on 10 March 2012, the museum complex includes Enzo Ferrari's birthplace and a futuristic automotive design gallery, painted in the yellow that Enzo Ferrari chose as the background for the Prancing horse on his logo. The exhibition gallery was designed by the famous architect Jan Kaplický, who suddenly died in 2009, and carried on by his associate and loyal assistant Andrea Morgante.

The interior features a multimedia display of pictures, unpublished films and precious mementoes of Enzo Ferrari's life as a man, driver and car-maker throughout the 20th century.

The Exhibition Gallery houses a flexible mounting representing story, figures, places and races of the Modenese sport motor racing.

==== Museum of Collectible Cards ====
Founded in 1986 by Giuseppe Panini, who then decided to donate his collection to the city, the Museo della figurina was opened to the public on 15 December 2006. It is located inside the Santa Margherita Palace, which also houses the Delfini Library and the City Gallery.

The Museum houses several collections, including, apart from the classic stickers, cigarette cards, letter seals, matchboxes and calendars, all of which represent a very important historical document of the development of picture cards throughout the years.

=== Teatro Comunale Modena ===
The Teatro Comunale Modena (Community Theatre of Modena, but renamed in October 2007 as "Teatro Comunale Luciano Pavarotti") is an opera house in Modena. The idea for the creation of the present theatre dates from 1838, when it became apparent that the then-existing Teatro Comunale di via Emilia (in dual private and public ownership) was no longer suitable for staging opera. However, this house had been the venue for presentations of all of the works of Donizetti, Bellini and Rossini up to this time, and a flourishing operatic culture existed in Modena.

Under the Mayor of Modena in collaboration with the Conservatorio dell'Illustrissima Comunità (Conservatory of the Most Illustrious Community), architect Francesco Vandelli was engaged to design the Teatro dell'Illustrissima Comunità, as the theatre was first called, "for the dignity of the city and for the transmission of the scenic arts". Paid for in the manner typical of the time – from the sale of boxes – in addition to a significant gift from Duke Friedrich IV, Vandelli created a design for the new theatre combining ideas from those in Piacenza, Mantua, and Milan, and it opened on 2 October 1841 with a performance of Gandini's Adelaide di Borgogna al Castello di Canossa, an opera specially commissioned for the occasion.

=== Cuisine ===
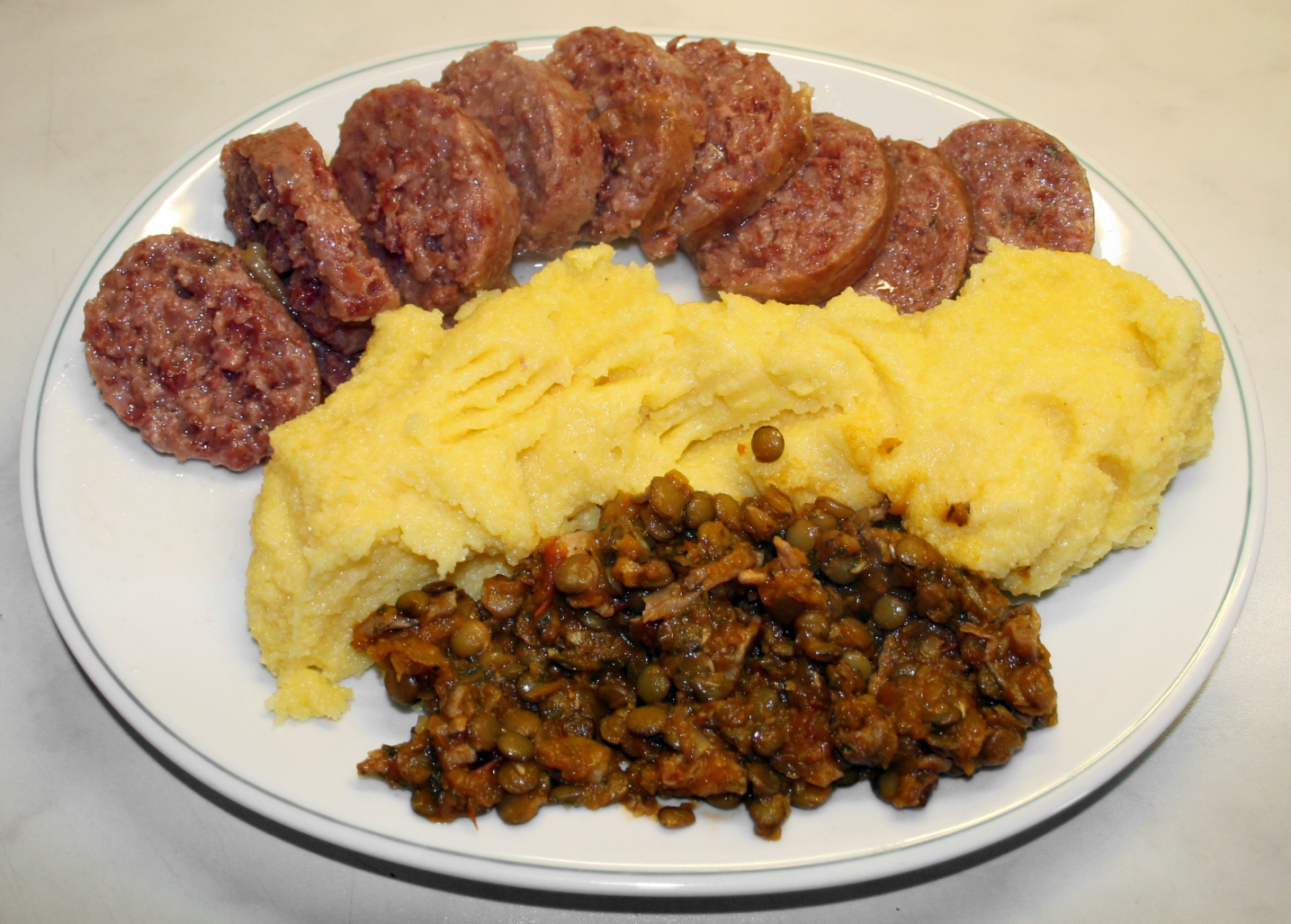
Cotechino Modena, as served with polenta and lentils

Modena has a rich and diversified cuisine, often including meats, hams and salamis. One of the most famous modenese dishes is zampone (the fatter and heartier version) or cotechino Modena (cotechino is leaner and less fat than zampone). Cotechino dates back to around 1511 to Mirandola, where, whilst besieged, the people had to find a way to preserve meat and use the less tender cuts, so made the cotechino. By the 18th century it had become more popular than the yellowish sausage had been around at the time, and in the 19th century was in mass production in and around the area.

Modena's contribution to the Italian pasta culture are tortellini and tortelloni, which are squares of pasta shaped in the form of a ring and stuffed with meat or cheese.

Cappello del prete is also a popular meal, which is a very fatty pig's trotter. Other dishes include torta Barozzi or torta nera, which is a black tart (a dessert made with a coffee/cocoa and almond filling encased in a fine pastry dough), ciccioli, made by slowly cooking, compressing, drying, and aging fatty, leftover pieces of pork, and pesto modenese, which is cured pork back fat pounded with garlic, rosemary and Parmesan, used to fill borlenghi and crescentine.

Balsamic vinegar of Modena became a protected geographical indication under EU law in 2000. The Balsamic Vinegar is a condiment for salad, cheese, strawberries and many other dishes. The practice of cooking the must of grapes can be traced back to the ancient Romans: the so-called sapum was used both as a medicinal product and in the kitchen as a sweetener and condiment. The long history of the Balsamic Vinegar came to us through centuries and now is most consumed abroad than in Italy.

Modena contains Italy's most acclaimed restaurant, Osteria Francescana, which holds three stars in the Michelin Guide since 2013 and, as of 2018, has been named as the best restaurant in the world in The World's 50 Best Restaurants.

=== Arts ===
Art studio fuse* is based in Modena.

== Economy ==
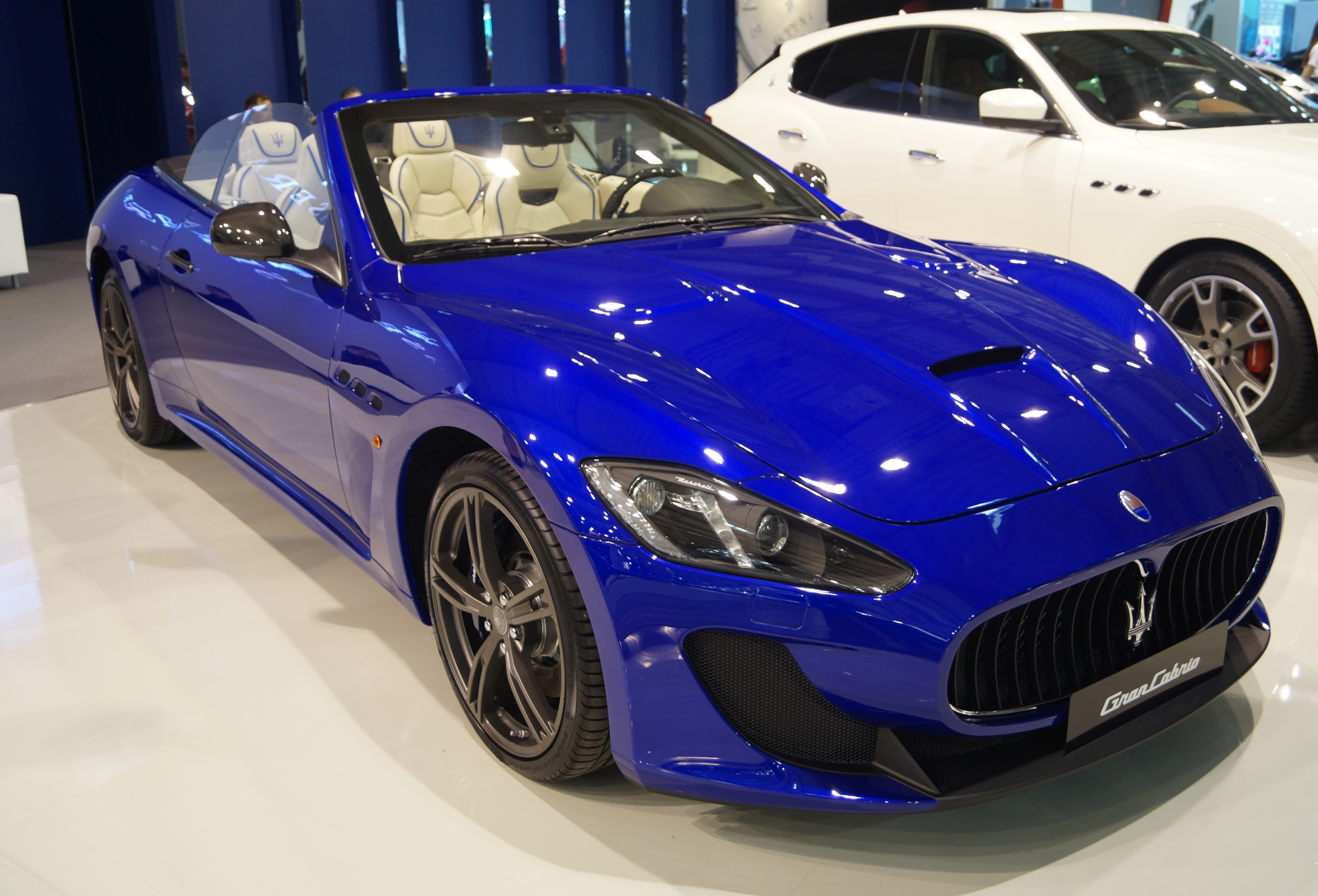
A Maserati GranCabrio MC

Modena and its province is one of Italy's most affluent areas, thanks to a rich agriculture and numerous small and medium manufacturing enterprises. Among the largest employers are BPER Banca, the publishing company Panini Group; Cremonini Group, one of Europe's largest meat packaging and catering companies; Grandi Salumifici Italiani and Parmareggio, Gruppo Fini other large food processing companies; Liu Jo, a large clothing company.

=== Automotive industry ===
Modena alongside Turin, are among Italy's main centres of the automotive industry, having a rich history and tradition in this field. The iconic Ferrari brand was founded in Modena by Modenese legendary car tycoon Enzo Ferrari, and today is headquartered just outside the city, in the suburb of Maranello. Several other Italian luxury automobile manufacturers such as Pagani and Maserati are headquartered in the Modena area. The electric motorcycle maker Energica Motor Company is headquartered in the city.

Carrozzeria Autodromo Modena, originally a maker of racing cars, which later became one of the best-known bus manufacturers in Italy, was based in Modena and in business from 1949 to 2004.

== Transport ==
=== Rail ===
Modena railway station, opened in 1859, forms part of the Milan–Bologna railway, and is also a terminus of two secondary railways, linking Modena with each of Verona and Sassuolo.

=== Urban transport ===
Modena's urban public transport network is operated by SETA. The network includes the Modena trolleybus system.

== Sport ==
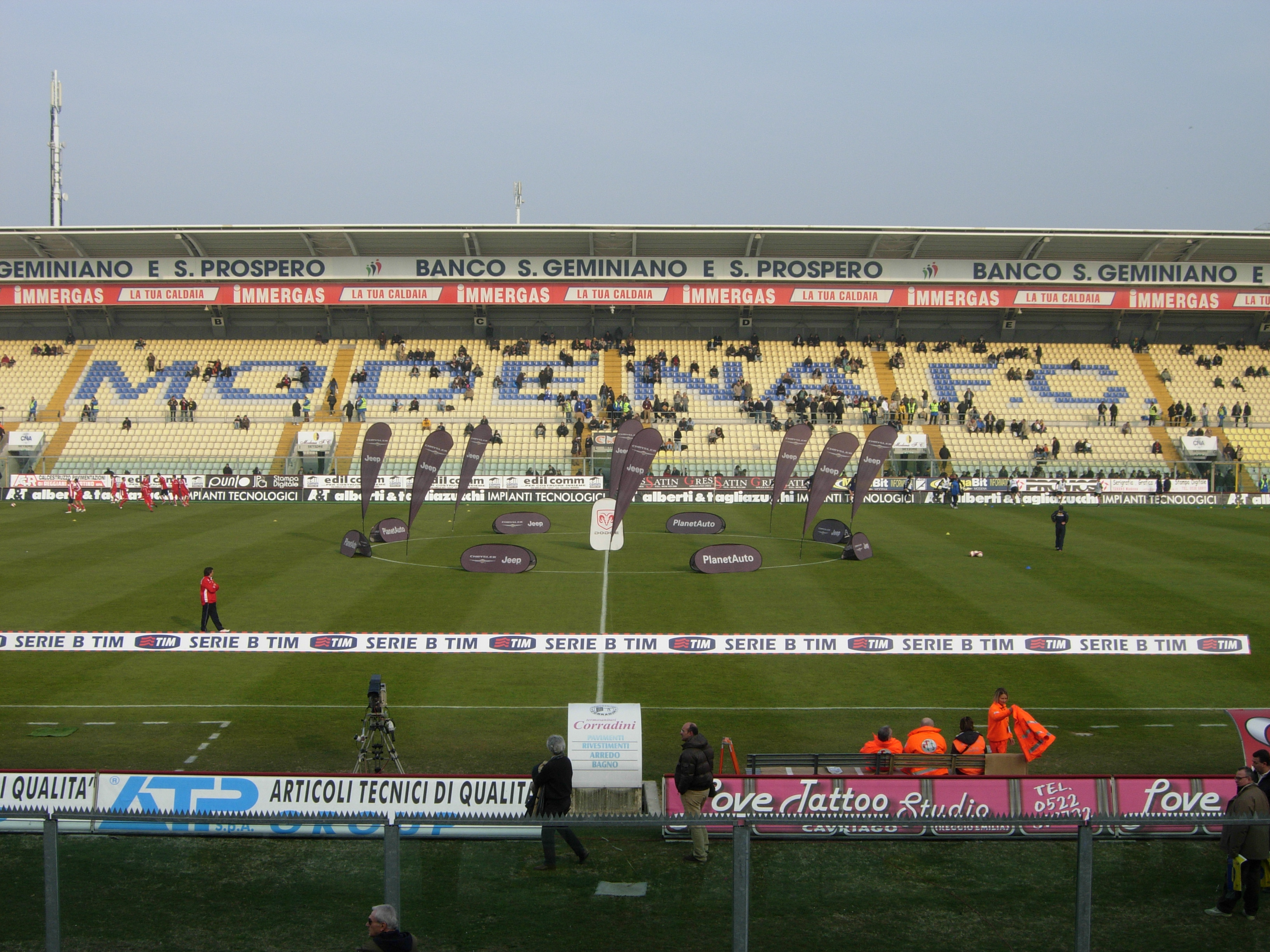
The Stadio Alberto Braglia, home of Modena FC

Modena has a strong sporting tradition, linked mainly to motor racing as the birthplace of Enzo Ferrari, founder of the eponymous motor racing team and car manufacturer based in nearby Maranello. The Ferrari 360 Modena was named after the city. Modena is known as the world's 'Supercar Capital', being the nearest large town to the homes of Maserati, Lamborghini, Pagani and previously also Ducati and De Tomaso.

The city has had two major football clubs: Modena F.C., who played in Serie B for many years but was dissolved in 2017, and Serie B team Carpi F.C. 1909. In 2018, Modena F.C. was reincarnated as Modena F.C. 2018 who play at the 21,151-seat Stadio Alberto Braglia, the former home of Modena F.C. which has also hosted international rugby union.

Volleyball plays an important role in Modena's sport history, with Modena Volley having won 12 National championships, four Champion's League seasons, and other trophies.

There is also a baseball club with 50 years' tradition—the Modena BBC, currently playing in the A-Series of the Italian Baseball League.

== Notable people ==
- Vittorio Bellentani (1906–1968), engineer and racing driver
- Aaron Berechiah of Modena (1549–1639), Jewish kabbalist and author
- Maurizio Ceresoli (born 1983), racing driver
- Giuseppe Castagnetti (1909–1965), Roman Catholic politician
- Abraham ben Daniel (1511-1578), poet and rabbi
- Enzo Ferrari (1898–1988), founder of Ferrari
- Mirella Freni (1935–2020), operatic soprano
- Francesco Guccini (b. 1940), singer and songwriter
- Stefano Modena (b. 1963), racing driver
- Gian-Luca Oppo (b. 1958), physicist
- Luciano Pavarotti (1935–2007), operatic tenor
- Abraham Rovigo (1650–1713), Jewish kabbalist, rabbi, and scholar.
- Sergio Sighinolfi (1925–1956), racing driver

== International relations ==
=== Twin towns – sister cities ===
Modena is twinned with:

- Almaty, Kazakhstan
- Benxi, China
- Highland Park, Illinois, United States
- Linz, Austria
- Londrina, Brazil
- Novi Sad, Serbia
- Saint Paul, Minnesota, United States

=== Consulates ===
- Latvia

== See also ==
- Aerautodromo di Modena
- Duchy of Modena and Reggio
- Duke of Ferrara and of Modena
- Mary of Modena, Queen of England
- Jacopo Zoboli
- Ludovico Antonio Muratori
