= Jennifer Soldati =

American politician

Member of New Hampshire House of Representatives
- In office 1989–1994

Personal details
- Born: September 16, 1947 Rochester, New Hampshire, U.S.
- Died: October 29, 2024 (aged 77)

Jennifer Gemma Soldati (September 16, 1947 – October 29, 2024) was an American politician. She was a member of the New Hampshire House of Representatives from 1989 to 1994 where she served as House Minority Whip. She was later a city councilor in Somersworth, New Hampshire.

== Early life and education ==
Soldati was born in Rochester, New Hampshire, the daughter of Lincoln Arturo Soldati and Virginia Eudalia Thomas. Her father was a World War II veteran who ran an Italian restaurant in Portsmouth; her mother was from Arkansas, and worked at Pease Air Force Base. Soldati graduated from St. Thomas Aquinas High School in 1965, and attended Emerson College. She graduated from New Hampshire College. Her brother Lincoln was mayor of Somersworth and a county attorney.

== Career ==
Soldati, a Democrat, served in the New Hampshire House of Representatives from 1989 to 1994, and was House Minority Whip. In 1989 she successfully sponsored a bill creating a motorcycle safety education program, but later that year she expressed disappointment with how the law was working. She sponsored a bill concerning Medicare reimbursements in 1991, and another bill protecting residents of mobile home parks from condominium conversions. In 1992, she was appointed to the National Commission on Manufactured Housing.

In 1992, Soldati resigned from the legislature during her third term, to become executive director of the New Hampshire Trial Lawyers Association. She was executive director of the Chamber of Commerce in Somerset, New Hampshire, from 2006 to 2015, and a member of the city council in Somersworth from 2012 to 2016.

Soldati was also a potter and an art teacher. She and her brother were avid hikers.

== Personal life ==
Soldati married Michael David Feinstein in 1970, at the Cathedral of the Holy Cross in Boston; their wedding was performed by Paul Shanley. They had two children, and divorced in 1979. Soldati died in 2024, at the age of 77.
