= Artechouse =

Art museum in Washington, D.C.

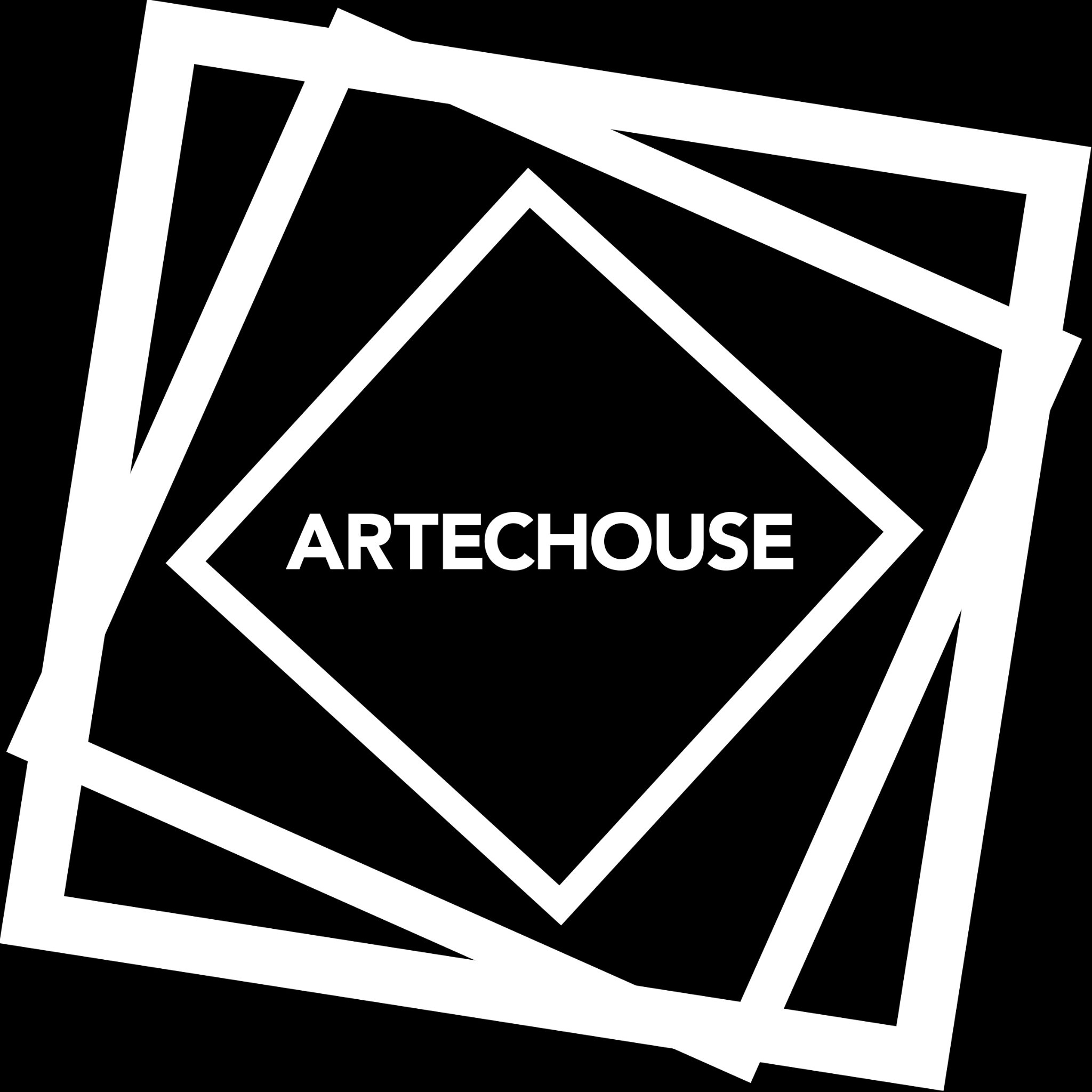

- Location within Washington, D.C. Artechouse (the United States)
- Established: June 2017
- Location: 1238 Maryland Ave SW, Washington, D.C.
- Coordinates: 38.884131°N 77.029213°W
- Type: Digital Art Space
- Website: artechouse.com

Artechouse (stylized in all caps) is an art space and destination for immersive and interactive art exhibitions. Dedicated to showcasing works by new media artists, Artechouse main goal is to present exhibitions that support its mission to inspire, educate, and empower others.

At Artechouse, visitors are offered an interactive experience. During after-hours, visitors at the Washington, D.C. location are invited to purchase an Augmented Reality cocktail inspired by the exhibition.

== History ==
Artechouse was founded in 2015 by art advocates Sandro Kereselidze and Tatiana Pastukhova. The first gallery opened in 2017 in the Southwest neighborhood of Washington, D.C., occupying a subterranean retail space that was vacant for over 25 years. Artechouse opened its second location in December 2018 on Collins Avenue in Miami Beach. A new location in the Chelsea neighborhood of New York City has been announced.

As of December 2018, Artechouse has presented ten exhibitions.

Washington, D.C.:

- Adrien M & Claire B, XYZT: Abstract Landscape, opened June 1, 2017
- ABlok & Noirflux, Spirit of Autumn, opened September, 2017
- Thomas Blanchard, Kingdom of Colors, opened October 21, 2017.
- Ouchhh, Parallel Universe, opened January 18, 2018
- Sakura Yume, Cherry Blossom Dream, opened March 15, 2018
- NONOTAK, Naked Eyes: Celebration of Light, opened May 16, 2018
- Julius Horsthuis, Fractal Worlds, opened July 6, 2018
- Marpi, New Nature, opened October 12, 2018.

Albuquerque, N.M.:

- Adrien M & Claire B, XYZT: Abstract Landscape, opened May 24, 2018

Miami, FL.:

- Adrien M & Claire B, XYZT: Abstract Landscape, opened December 8, 2018.
