= Giorgio Soldati =

Giorgio Soldati (died 5 June 1609) was an Italian Jesuit priest and architect. He is known for having designed the church of San Bartolomeo, Modena. He died from a fall from scaffolding.
