= Torta Barozzi =

Italian cake

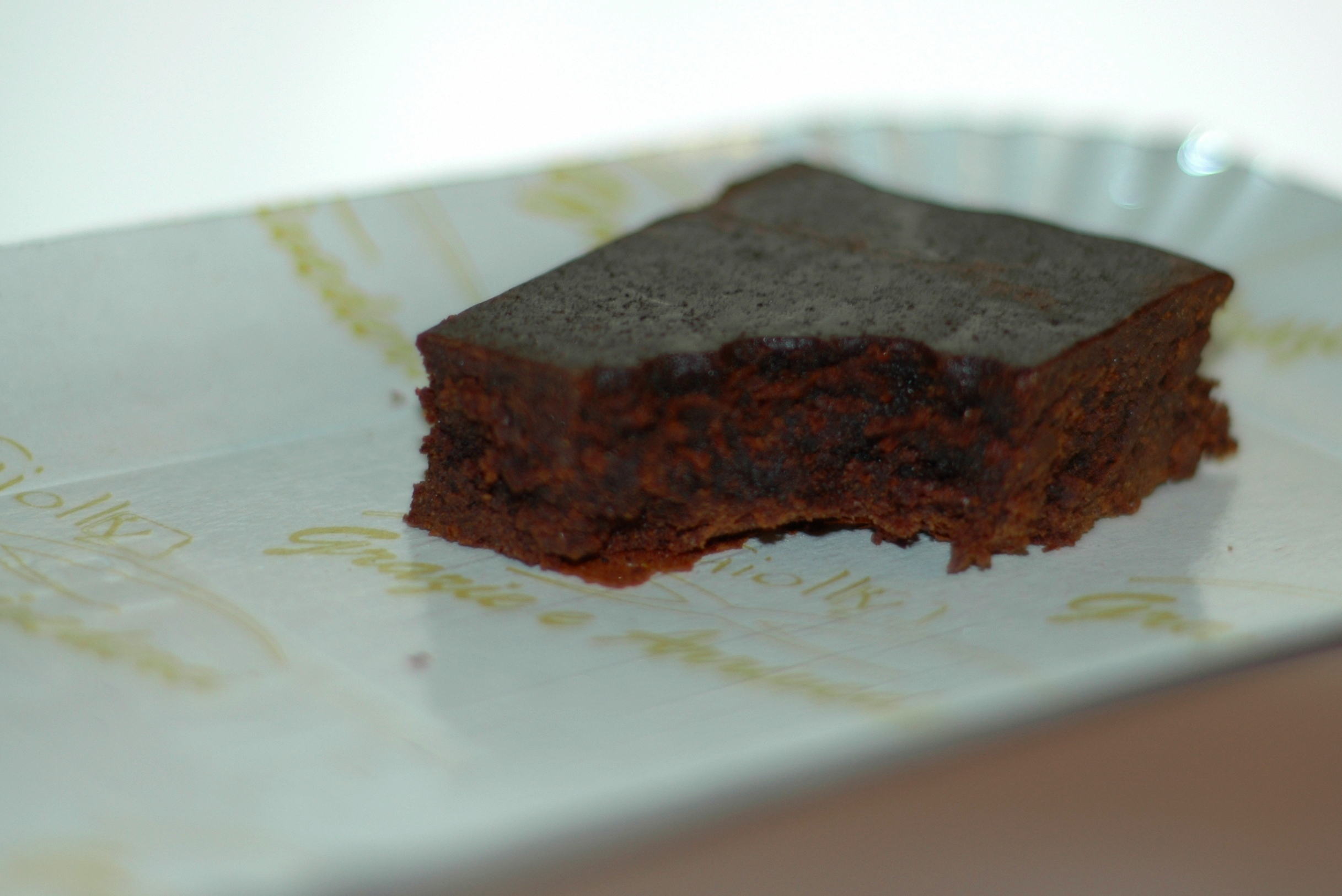
A piece of torta Barozzi

Torta Barozzi is an Italian dessert.

Italian: (...Si presenta come una piccola zolla di terra e come una zolla si sbriciola... È un incantevole mistero fatto di mille aromi che confondono il palato in una sinfonia di dolcezza...)

(...It presents itself as a small clod of earth and like a clod it crumbles... It is an enchanting mystery made up of a thousand aromas that confuse the palate in a symphony of sweetness...)

— Michele Serra,

Italian pastry chef Eugenio Gollini created the cake in his pastry shop in 1897 in Vignola and named it in honour of Italian renaissance architect Giacomo Barozzi da Vignola. It is a chocolate cake, flavoured with coffee, almonds, and peanuts. It is flourless and gluten free. The cake can be cut and served in thin wedges. Torta Barozzi delivers every taste sensation of a moist, fudgy texture, punctuated with the flavour of the ground almonds, and a meringue-like top.

== See also ==
- List of Italian desserts and pastries
- List of cakes
