= Zatara (disambiguation) =

Zatara may also refer to:

== People ==
- Imad Zatara (born 1984), Swedish-born Palestinian footballer
- Ilunga Mande Zatara (born 1983), Democratic Republic of Congo Olympic runner

== Characters ==
- Zatara Master Magician, a DC Comics comics title
- Zatanna Zatara, the superheroine "Zatanna", daughter of John Zatara
- For the Golden Age character, see Giovanni "John" Zatara
- For the Teen Titans ally, see Zachary Zatara
- Wanda Zatara, an Amalgam Comics character, see List of Amalgam Comics characters

== See also ==
- Zattara, province of Africa, Roman Empire
- Giuseppe Zattera (1826–1891), Italian landscape painter
