= Galleria Estense =

Art museum in Modena, Italy

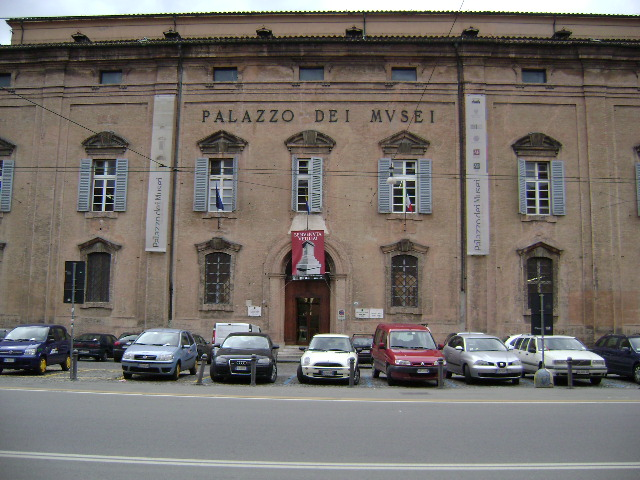
- Frontal view of Palazzo dei Musei
- Established: 1894
- Location: Largo Porta Sant'Agostino, 337; 41121 Modena, Italy
- Coordinates: 44.6485°N 10.9216°E
- Type: Art museum, Historic site
- Website: www.gallerie-estensi.beniculturali.it

The Galleria Estense is an art gallery in the heart of Modena, centred around the collection of the d'Este family: rulers of Modena, Reggio and Ferrara from 1289 to 1796. Located on the top floor of the Palazzo dei Musei, on the St. Augustine square, the museum showcases a vast array of works ranging from fresco and oil painting to marble, polychrome and terracotta sculpture; musical instruments; numismatics; curios and decorative antiques.

It was publicly established in 1854 by the last duke, Francis V of Austria-Este, and was relocated in 1894 to its current situation from the Palazzo Ducale.

Since 2014, the Gallery has formed a part the Gallerie Estensi, an independent complex of museums merging the Biblioteca Estense, and the Estense Lapidary Museum in Modena, the Palazzo Ducale in Sassuolo and the Pinacoteca Nazionale in Ferrara. Together, they reflect the progressing tastes of an Italian court of nobility.

== Description ==
The Estense Gallery consists of sixteen exhibition rooms with four large salons arranged thematically. The collection houses an eclectic range of oeuvres executed by both notable and local artists. Although for the most part centred around Italian painters, it also includes a modest number of Flemish, German and French artworks (Workshop of van Eyck; Aelbrecht Bouts; Charles Le Brun), as well as non-Western examples from Sierra Leone and Iran.

Among the decorative objects of note, the mannerist "Estense Harp" stands out. A rare musical instrument, the double harp's 148 cm were crafted entirely by hand through a collaboration between five Ferrarese and Flemish artists: Giacometti, Marescotti, Bastarolo, Rosselli and Lamberti. It then comes as no surprise that it featured on Italian 1,000 lire banknotes next to Verdi from 1961 to 1981. The gallery also houses a Madonna and Child and a Telamon by the Modenese sculptor Wiligelmo, an 18th-century coral nativity scene and a still-life carved in wood celebrating the ascension of James II of England.

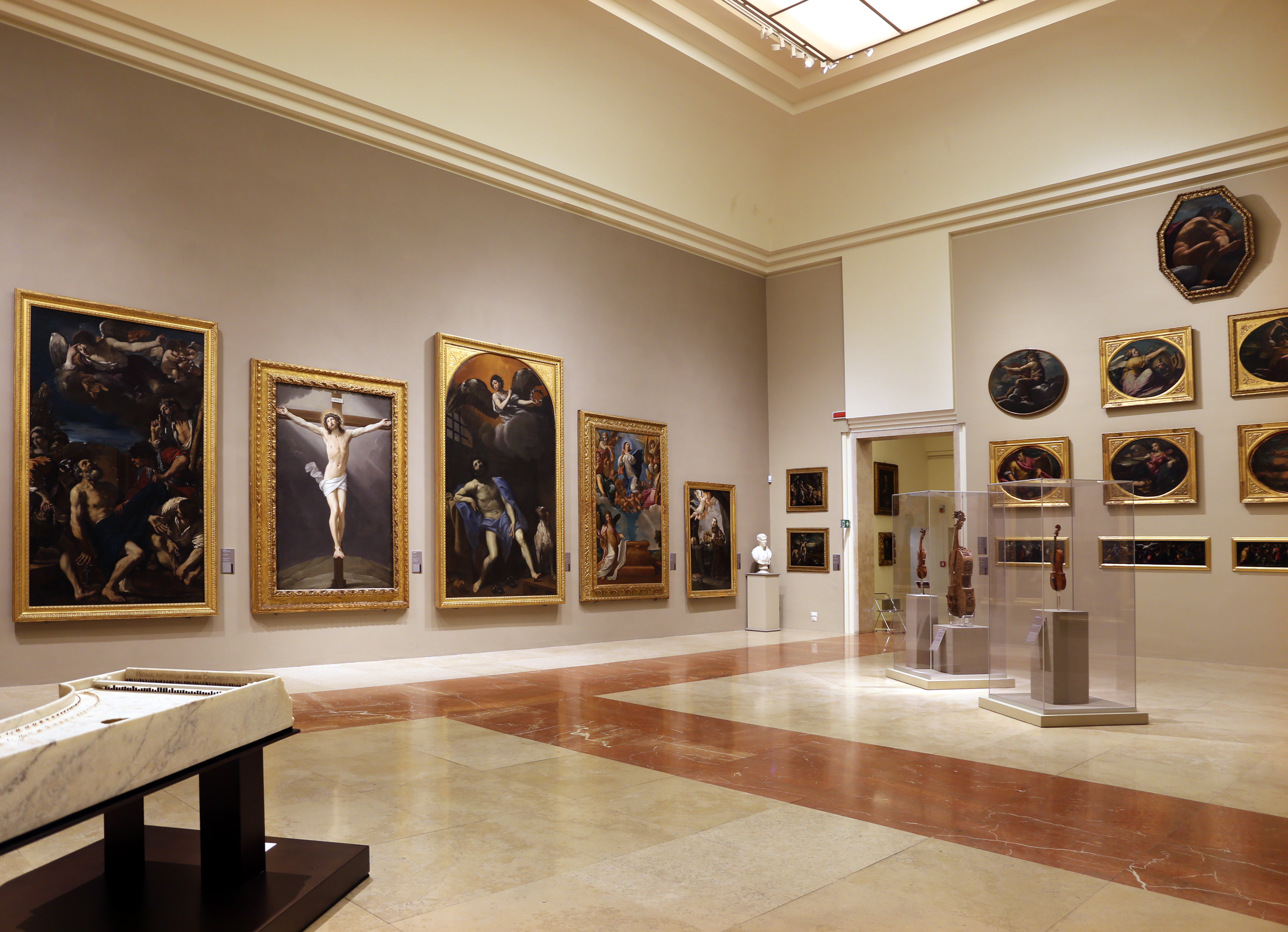
The late 17th-century Emilian painting room with newly installed lighting juxtaposes paintings and musical instruments: Reni's Crucifixion and oval ceiling panels from Virginia de Medici's apartment in Ferrara with Galli's carved string instruments and Grandi's Carrara marble harpsichord.

=== History ===
==== Cesare I ====
In 1598, the Este dukes were forced to yield their seat of Ferrara to Pope Clement VIII and the capital of the dukedom was relocated to Modena. Duke Cesare tried to bring with him as much of the Este inheritance as possible, including many cases full of rare and precious objects.

As for the remaining works in Ferrara, Cesare, who was perhaps not as fond of art patronage as his ancestors, did not hesitate to donate large parts of the collection to seek favour with powerful political figures, notably the Cardinal Borghese and Ferdinand II, Holy Roman Emperor.

==== Francesco I ====
Francesco I, successor of Alfonso III, was a man of great ambition. He was determined to both regain Ferrara and restore the artistic atmosphere characteristic of the Ferrarese court in Modena. For the new capital of the diminished Duchy of Modena and Reggio, he envisioned an imposing ducal residence, entrusting the project to Bartolomeo Avanzini. The Roman architect was advised by Bernini, whose engagement with the Pope prevented him from accepting the task.

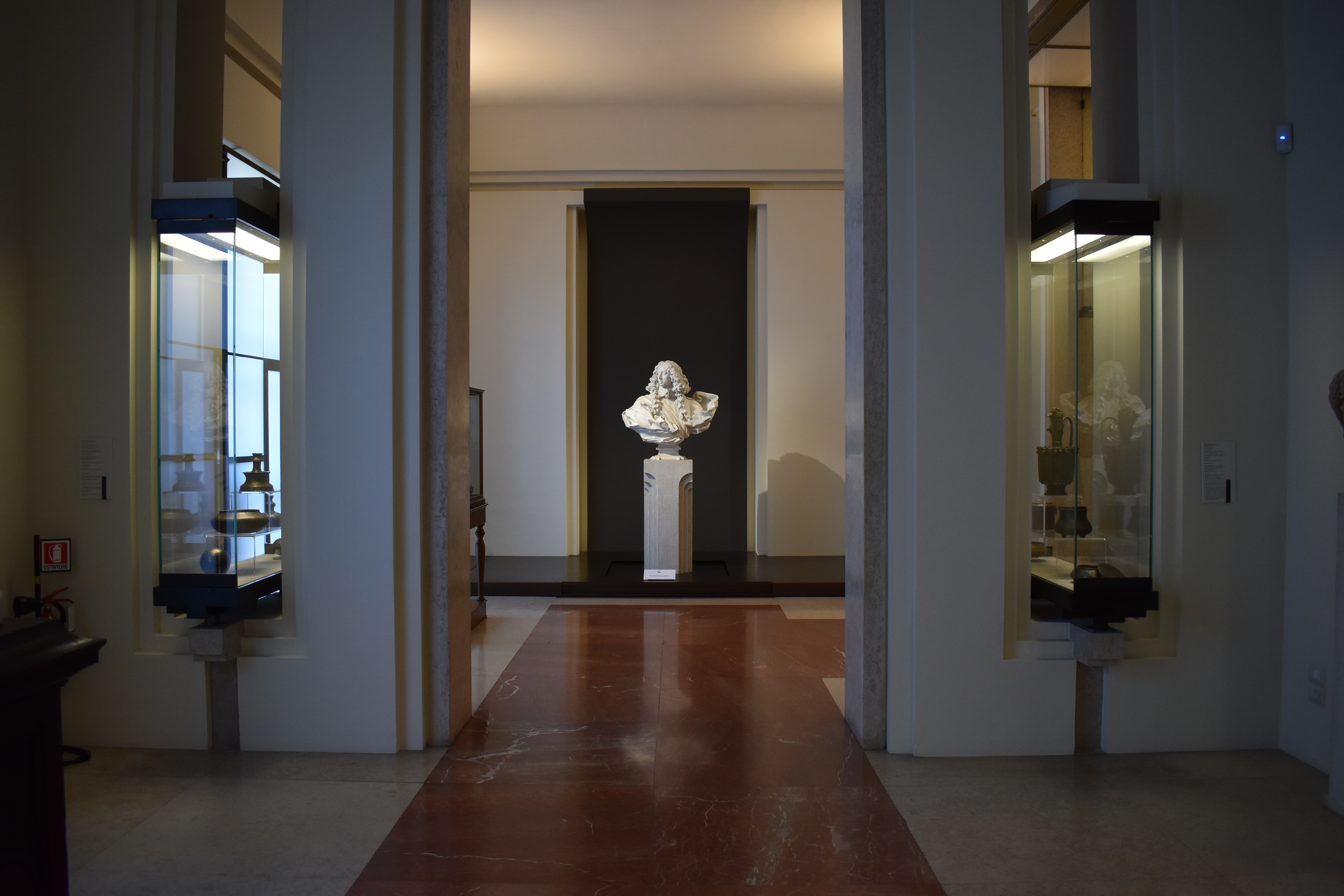
View upon entering the Gallery. Bernini's bust of Francesco I d'Este, widely considered a seminal example of Baroque portraiture, cornerstones the first and second rooms displaying Greco-Roman antiquities, followed by altarpieces and polychromy from the fourteenth century.

During a diplomatic trip to Spain, Francesco had his portrait painted by Diego Velázquez, a work which remains a precious treasure of the Estense collection. An equally revered marble portrait executed by Bernini now welcomes viewers entering the gallery. Not only does it effortlessly capture the duke's likeness and bravura, Bernini also never once laid eyes on his subject in the flesh, using effigies by Justus Sustermans and Jean Boulanger as prompts instead. To overcome the reluctance of the sculptor, who in a letter to the duke's brother, Cardinal Rinaldo, judged the task as not only extremely difficult but reckless, an exorbitant sum of 3000 scudi was offered, the exact amount paid to Bernini by the Pope Innocent X for his Four Rivers Fountain in Rome.

Other valuable works donated or purchased by the duke joined the collection at this time, such as paintings by Paolo Veronese, Salvator Rosa, Hans Holbein and another marble bust by Bernini, this time dedicated to his lover.

Ever the art lover, Francesco began appropriating paintings from churches and monasteries within the duchy: a habit to be routinely adopted by his successors in the years to come. The works were replaced by second-rate copies, often veiled from the eyes of the priests who tried to resist. Pieces by Correggio, Parmigianino and Cima da Conegliano all entered into the ducal collection in this way.

==== Francesco I's successors ====
Francesco's son Alfonso IV was the first to open the gallery to the public. His wife Laura Martinozzi, granddaughter of Cardinal Mazzarino, became regent to the duchy on the death of her husband, given their son, Francesco II, was only two years old. The duchess did not contribute to the gallery purchases, dedicating herself for the most part to charitable works and the construction of churches and convents, with the aim of repairing a state severely affected by the outbreak of plague and the Thirty Years' War.

The gallery was not enriched, but depleted during the successive reigns of Francesco II. In order to raise funds, the duke decided to sell the finest pieces of the collection to Augustus III of Poland for the considerable sum of 100,000 Venetian zecchini (the equivalent of around 650 kg of gold). Thus, in July 1746, works by Giulio Romano, Andrea del Sarto, Rubens, Velázquez, Holbein, Titian, Parmigianino, Correggio, Guercino, Guido Reni, Carracci, and many others embarked for Dresden. Such works may still be admired in the Gemäldegalerie Alte Meister today. Neither was Rinaldo I, his uncle and successor, able to enrich the duchy artistically.

Ercole III and his predecessor, Francesco III, used the same pillaging method as Francesco I to salvage the gallery: depredating the duchy's churches, but also aided by the use of raw impositions. One such example lies with Niccolò dell'Abbate's frescoes detached from the walls of the Rocca di Scandiano, from which some paintings also arrived.

==== Napoleonic interlude ====
Such was the reputation of the d'Este collections, (the French letterato Charles de Brosses considered it "undoubtedly the finest in Italy") it also attracted the eye of Napoleon. At the Armistice of Cherasco, he decreed that twenty of the Estensi paintings should go to Paris as payment for expenses of war incurred during his Italian campaigns of 1796. After a few months, the number increased to seventy. This period marks the most significant ransacking of Modena's collections of paintings, drawings, archival books, and the d'Este's glyptic collection.

On 14 October 1796 Napoleon entered Modena with two new commissars, Pierre-Anselme Garrau and Antoine Christophe Saliceti. Both went several times to sift through the Gallery of Drawings and Medals in the Palazzo Ducale, selecting works cited by visitors to the palace. Gilded enamel cameos and engraved semi-precious stones were sent to the Louvre and to their own estates. Some drawings were delegated to Modena's Academy of Fine Arts for didactic purposes, however an overwhelming number were sent to Paris, where they have remained ever since. Of the previously enviable selection reflecting high Renaissance practices which included the likes of Correggio, Parmigianino, Giulio Romano, Perino del Vaga, the Carracci brothers, Botticelli's Calumny of Apelles, and a Judgement of Solomon by the workshop of Mantegna, only 700 remain. Currently housed in storage in Modena, the digital collection may now be viewed on the gallery's website.

On 17 October, 94 volumes were chosen to be transferred from the ducal library to the Bibliothèque Nationale in Paris, including numerous manuscripts and ancient codices. Napoleon personally took two 16th to 18th-century editions of Caesar's Commentarii whilst rapidly passing through Modena. As for the collection of coins, the Bibliothèque received 900 imperial bronze coins, 124 of which were from Roman colonies; 10 silver; 31 incised; as well as 44 Greek and 103 from the Papal mint. Napoleon's wife Joséphine followed suite. During her sojourn in Modena's Palazzo Ducale in February 1797, she was unsatisfied with merely 'looking at' the numismatic collection. The empress took about two hundred, in addition to those selected by the court members of her husband who accompanied her.

Numerous paintings of the Emilian school such as Guercino's altarpiece depicting Modena's patron saints (1651) and his St. Paul (1644), as well as The Purification of the Virgin by Guido Reni, The Virgin Appears to Saints Luke and Catherine (1592) by Annibale Carracci, The Dream of Job (1593) by Cigoli, The Mocking of Christ by Giambologna and others never returned. It is estimated that 1,300 pictures were exported to the Louvre.

==== Restoration ====
From his exile in Treviso, Ercole III sold various objects he had brought with him, but he also made some additions to his collection, in an attempt to remedy the Napoleonic plundering. With the restoration of Duke Francis IV of Austria-Este in Modena and the Treaty of Paris (1815) came the recovering of many important works. Only 21 paintings previously part of the Estense collection returned to Modena, in addition to two new paintings acquired as remuneration by Charles Le Brun.

On the backdrop of the Church's diminishing status came the growing trend for art collection as a means of upholding the local authority of the nobility. Francis IV thus contributed works to the gallery from nearby towns through the tried and tested Este method of looting churches. In 1822, a newfound interest in early Italian "Primitive" paintings prompted the acquisitions from the rich collection of Marquis Tommaso degli Obizzi, including works by Barnaba da Modena, Apollonio di Giovanni, Bartolomeo Bonascia and Francesco Bianchi Ferrari. His son Francis V also made some new purchases and reopened the gallery relocated during the reign of his father to the Palazzo Ducale.

==== From 1859 to today ====
With the unification of Italy in 1859, the Este line came to an end.

During the transition there were inevitably some losses and thefts. Luigi Carlo Farini, reigning dictator over the Modenese provinces on behalf of the new Italian government, was accused by some of having appropriated valuables kept in the Palazzo Ducale in which he and his government resided, although it is as of yet unclear on what grounds such allegations were made.

In 1879, the palace became the headquarters of the Military Academy, depriving the city of its use. The gallery was forced to relocate to the eighteenth-century palace built by Francesco III, now known as the Palazzo dei Musei, where it coexists with the Lapidary Museum, the Civic Museum and Archives on the ground floor and the Estense library on the third floor.

The gallery's itinerary has undergone several rearrangements over the years, with the curation of the rooms remaining in a constant state of revision. A notably recent change occurred following the earthquake in May 2012. After a three-year renovation period, it was reopened to the public in 2015. Never-before-seen works were retrieved from storage, new lighting and a microclimate system supporting the conservation of exhibits and digital displays were installed, ensuring the Estense Gallery remains a nucleus of culture to both locals and tourists travelling off the beaten track on their way from Venice to Rome.

== Collection ==
- Bust of St. Monica by Niccolo dell'Arca
- Nativity with the Two Midwives by Pellegrino Aretusi
- Tancred baptizes Clorinda by Sisto Badalocchio
- Terracotta sculptures by Antonio Begarelli
- Bust of Francesco I d'Este by Gian Lorenzo Bernini
- Crucifixion and St. Christopher by Aelbrecht Bouts
- Miniatures by Anna Campori
- Engraved portrait miniature by Rosalba Carriera
- Madonna and Child with St. Anne by Joos van Cleve
- Lamentation with St. Francis and St. Bernardino by Cima da Conegliano
- Madonna Campori and others by Correggio
- The Nativity by Battista Dossi
- The Jester; panels from Alfonso d'Este's Bedroom Ceiling; Ercole d'Este and others by Dosso Dossi
- Modena Triptych by El Greco
- Hercules on Horseback, sculpture by Bertoldo di Giovanni
- Madonna and Child by follower of Jan Gossaert
- A Carrara marble Guitar and Harpsichord by Michele Antonio Grandi
- Martyrdom of St. Peter; Venus, Cupid and Mars and others by Guercino
- Portrait of the poet Fulvio Testi by Ludovico Lana
- Moses Defends Jethro's Daughters; The Marriage of Moses and Zipporah by Charles Le Brun
- Portrait of Francis of Valois-Angouleme by Corneille de Lyon
- Lucretia, Brutus and Collatinus by Gianfrancesco Maineri
- Portraits and Henry IV at Canossa by Adeodato Malatesta
- Portable polyptychs by Tommaso and Barnaba da Modena
- Martyrdom of St. Catherine by Lelio Orsi
- Madonna and Child by Domenico Panetti
- Landscapes attributed to Antonio Francesco Perruzzini
- Christ Crucified by Guido Reni
- Ecstasy of St. Francis; The Fortune Teller by Lionello Spada
- Scenes from Ovid's Metamorphoses by Tintoretto
- St. Anthony of Padua by Cosimo Tura
- Adoration of the Magi by Palma Vecchio
- Portrait of Francesco I d'Este, Duke of Modena by Diego Velázquez
- San Geminiano Organ Shutter panels by Paolo Veronese
- The Dance of Hours by Giuseppe Zattera
- Roundels from Virginia de' Medici's Apartment in the Palazzo dei Diamanti by the Carracci brothers
- A collection of fresco cycles from the Rocca di Scandiano by Niccolò dell'Abate and from the Rocca di Novellara by Lelio Orsi.

== Key works ==
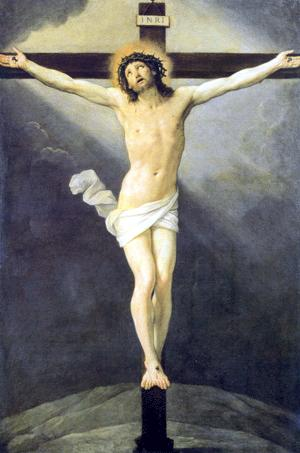
Guido Reni, Christ Crucified, 1636.

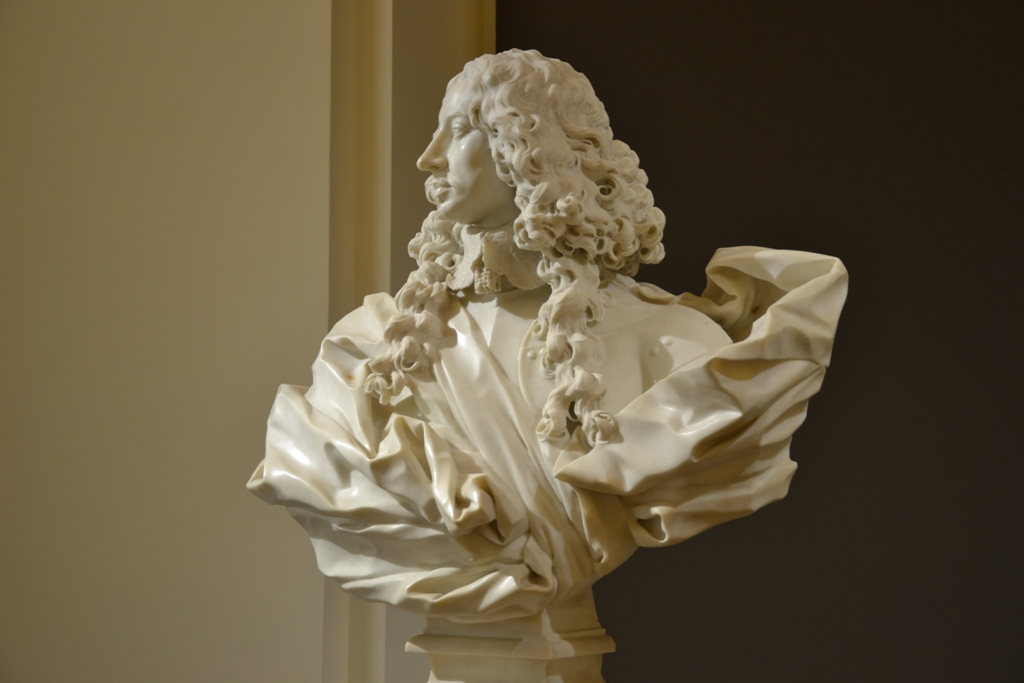
Gian Lorenzo Bernini, Bust of Francesco I d'Este, 1650–1.

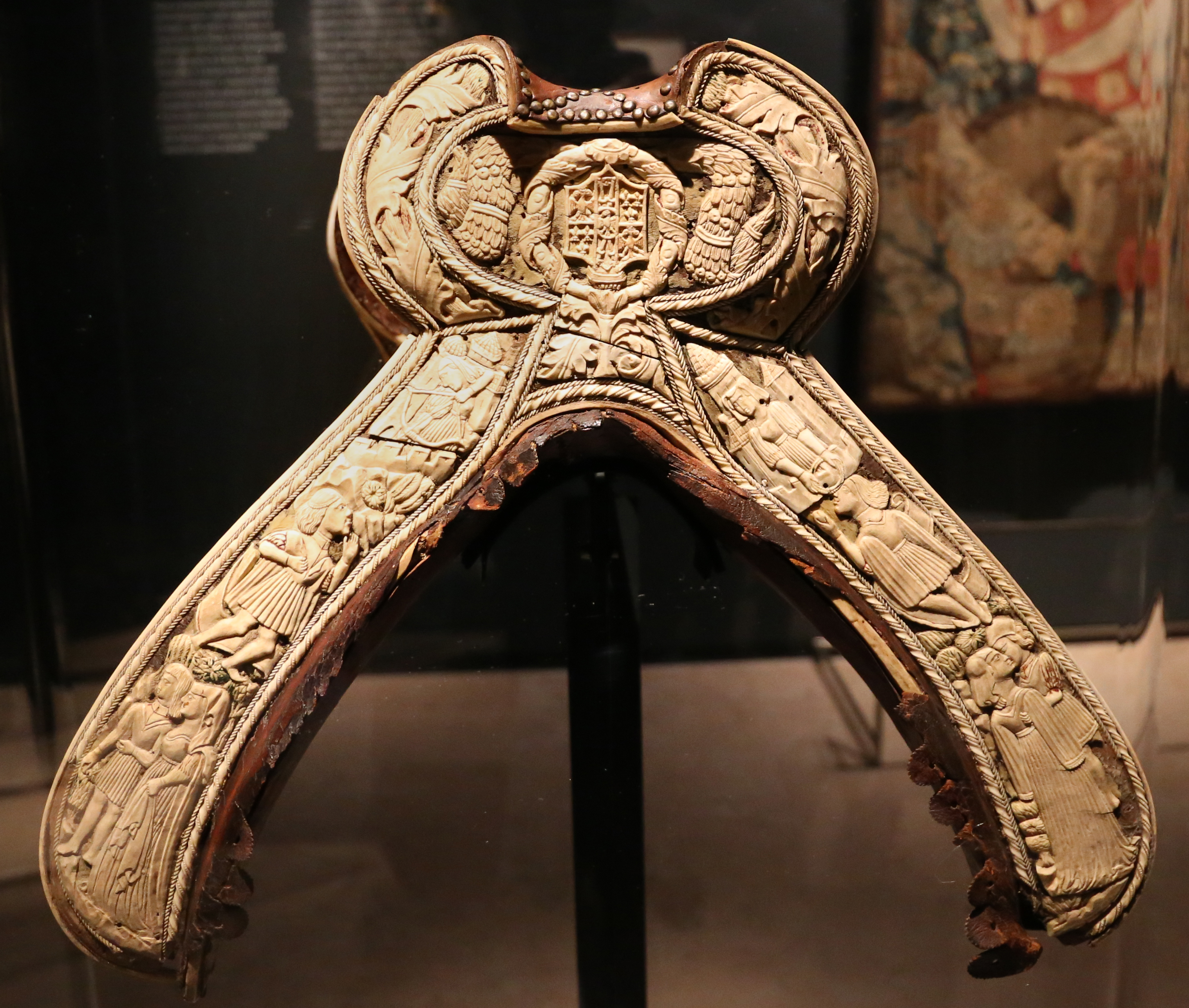
Parade saddle, 1470–80.

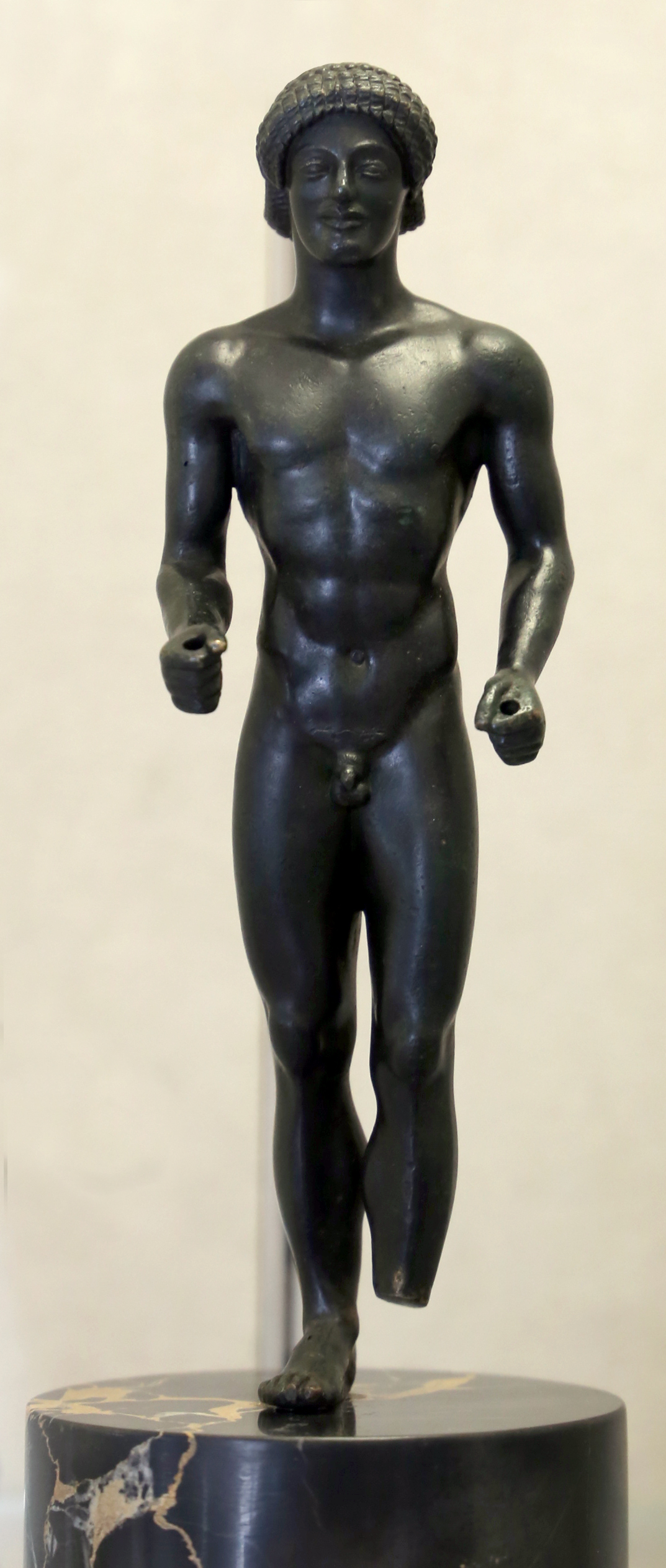
Kouros, early 5th century B.C.

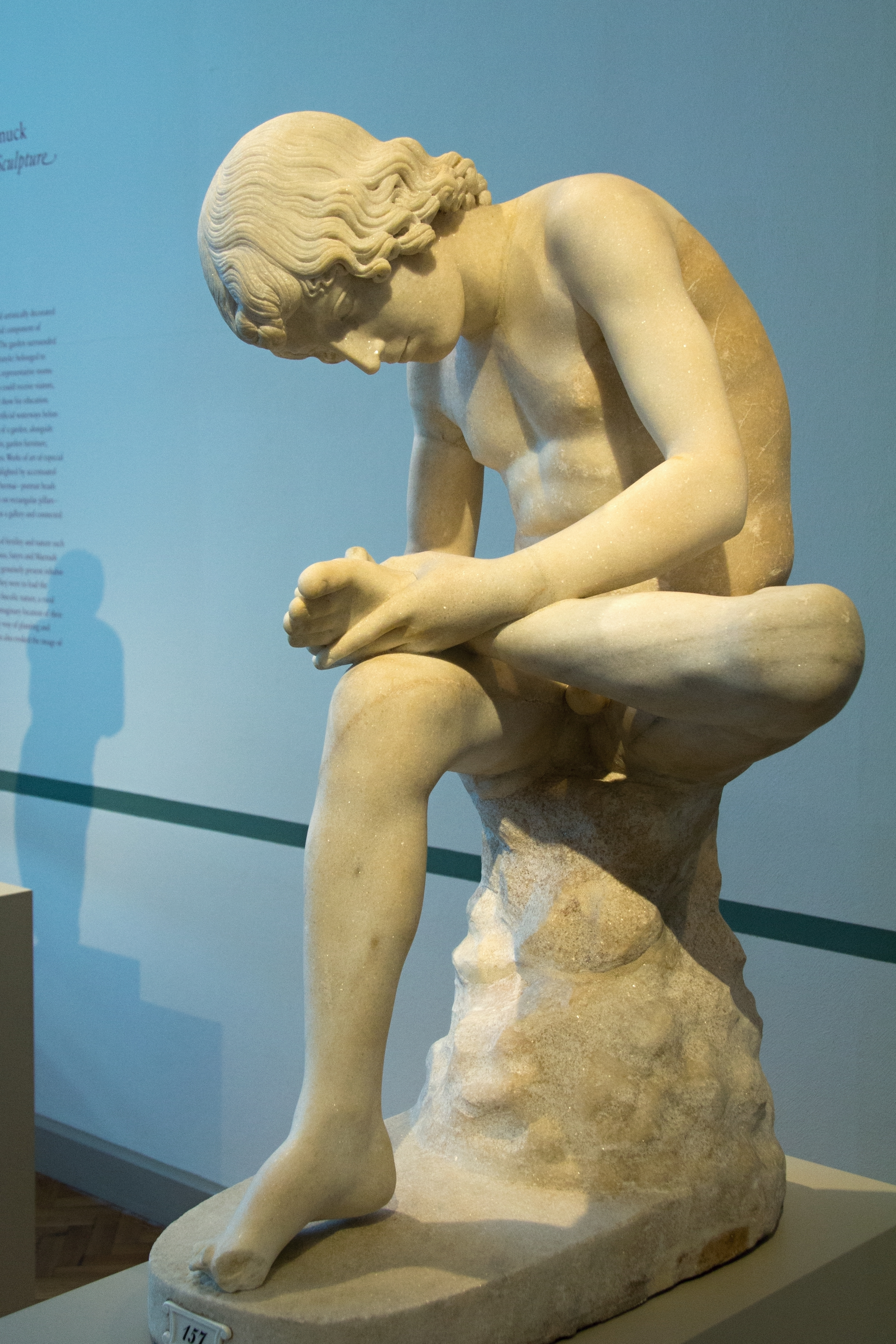
Boy with thorn, late 1st century B.C.

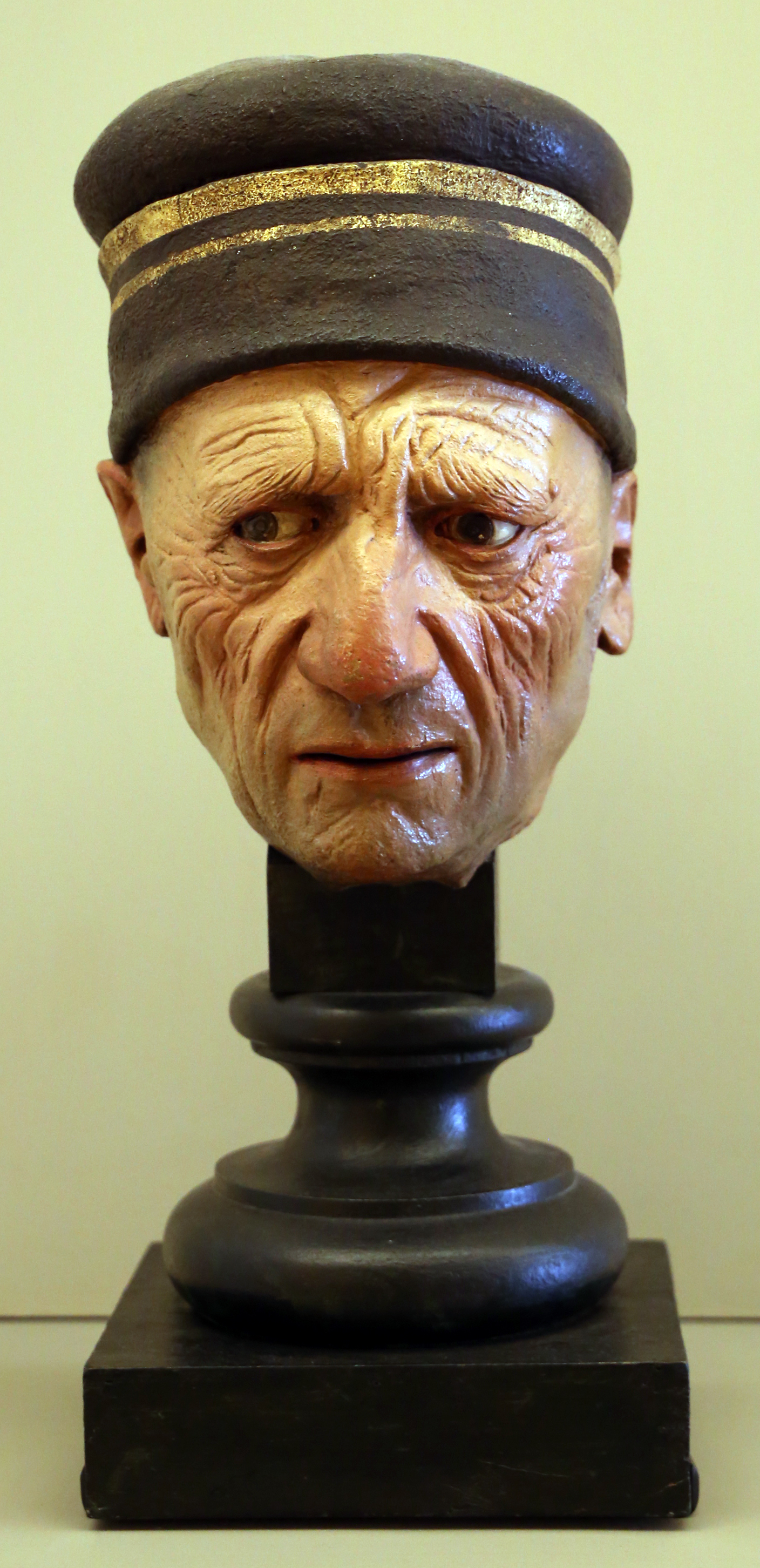
Guido Mazzoni, Head of an old man, 1480–5.

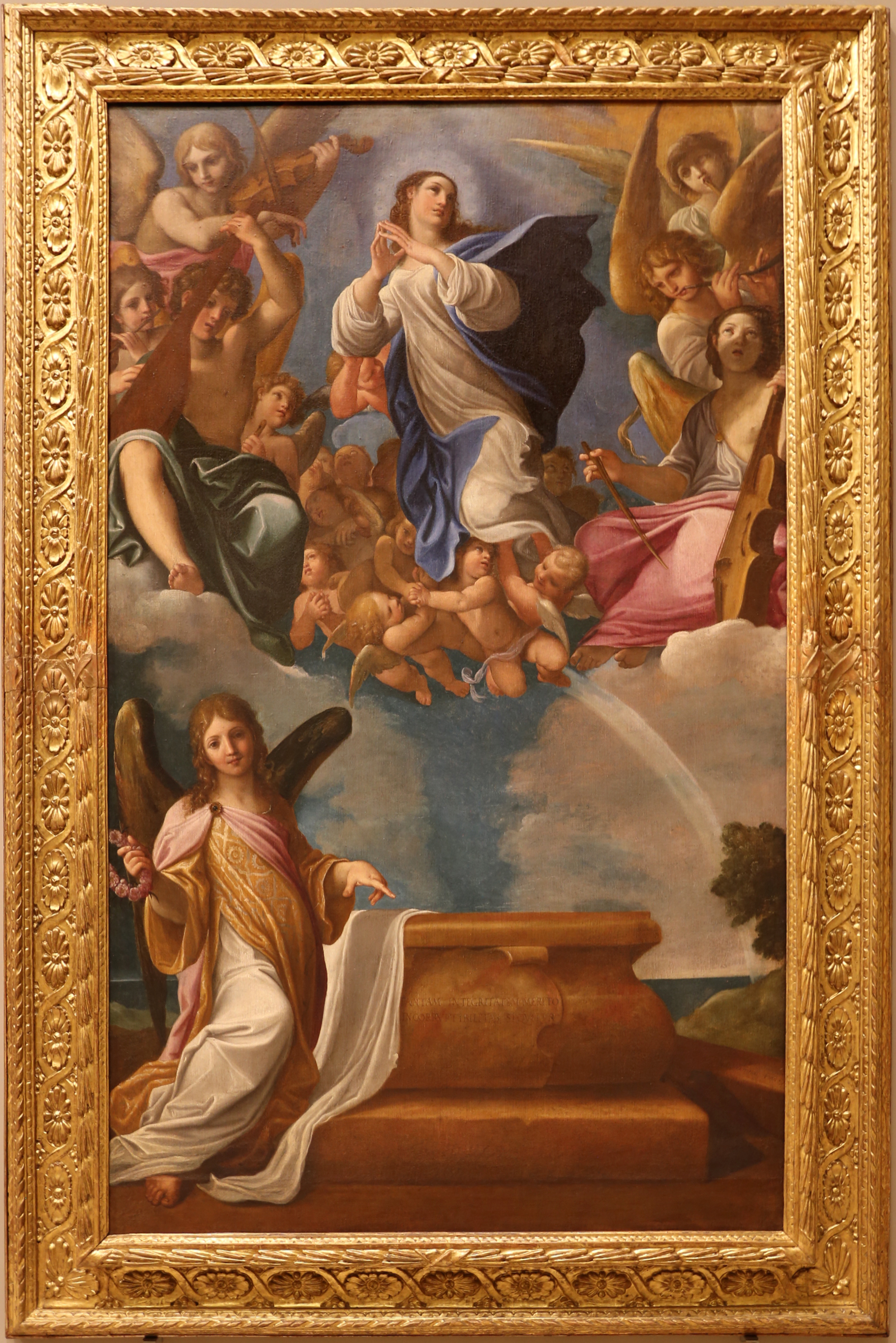
Ludovico Carracci, The Assumption of the Virgin, 1607.

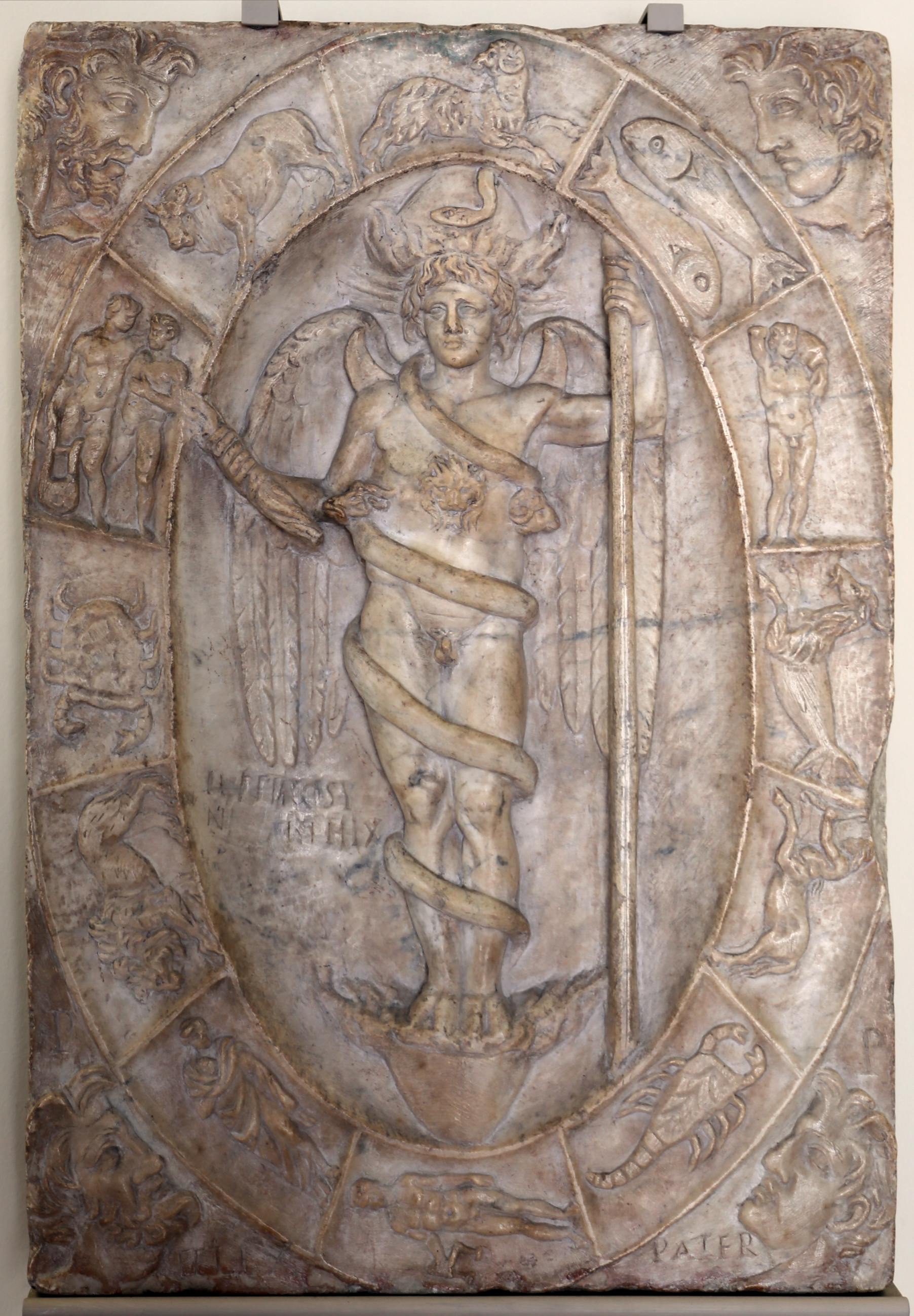
Relief with Aion-Phanes, 125–50 AD.

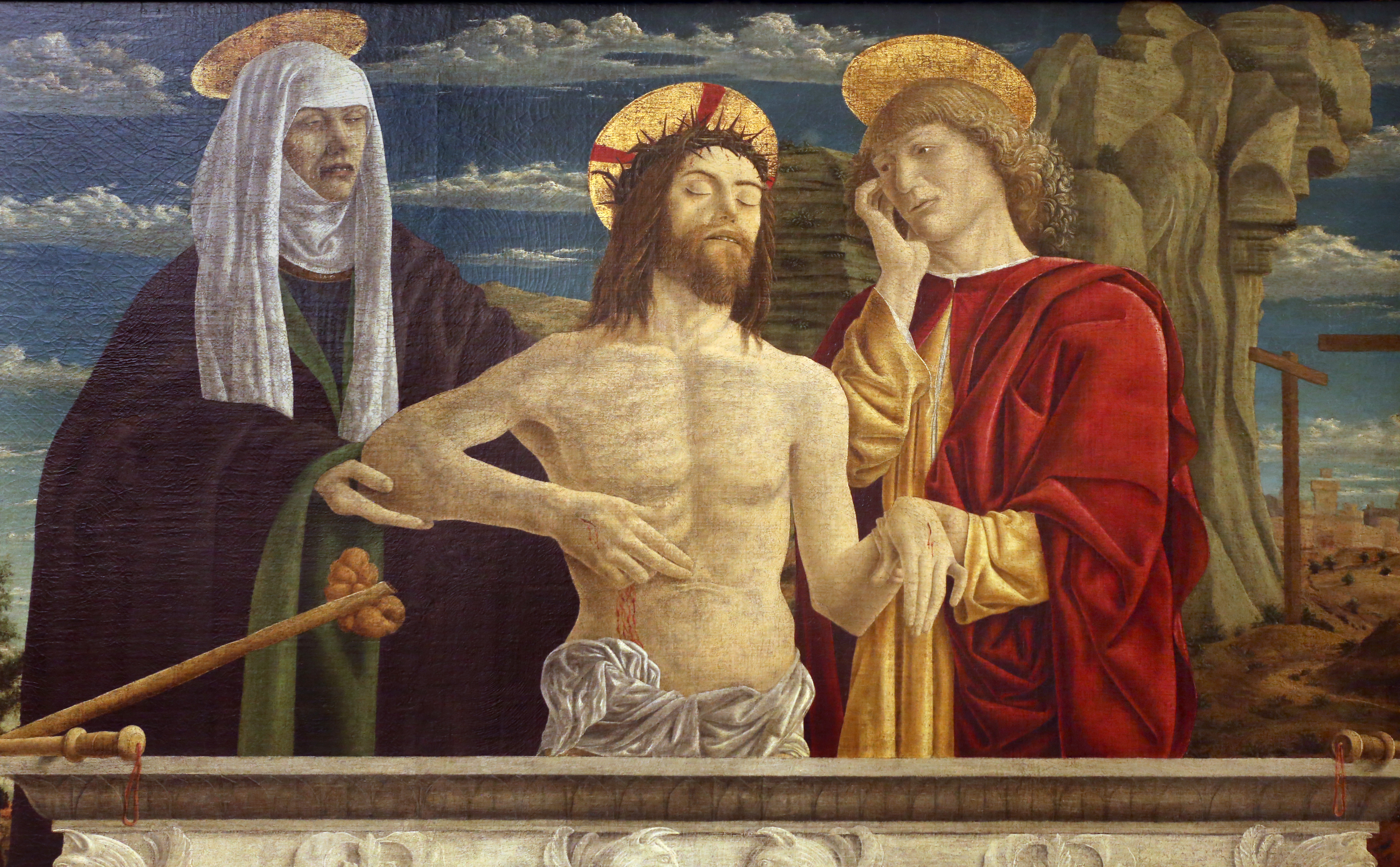
Bartolomeo Bonascia, Pietà, 1475–95.

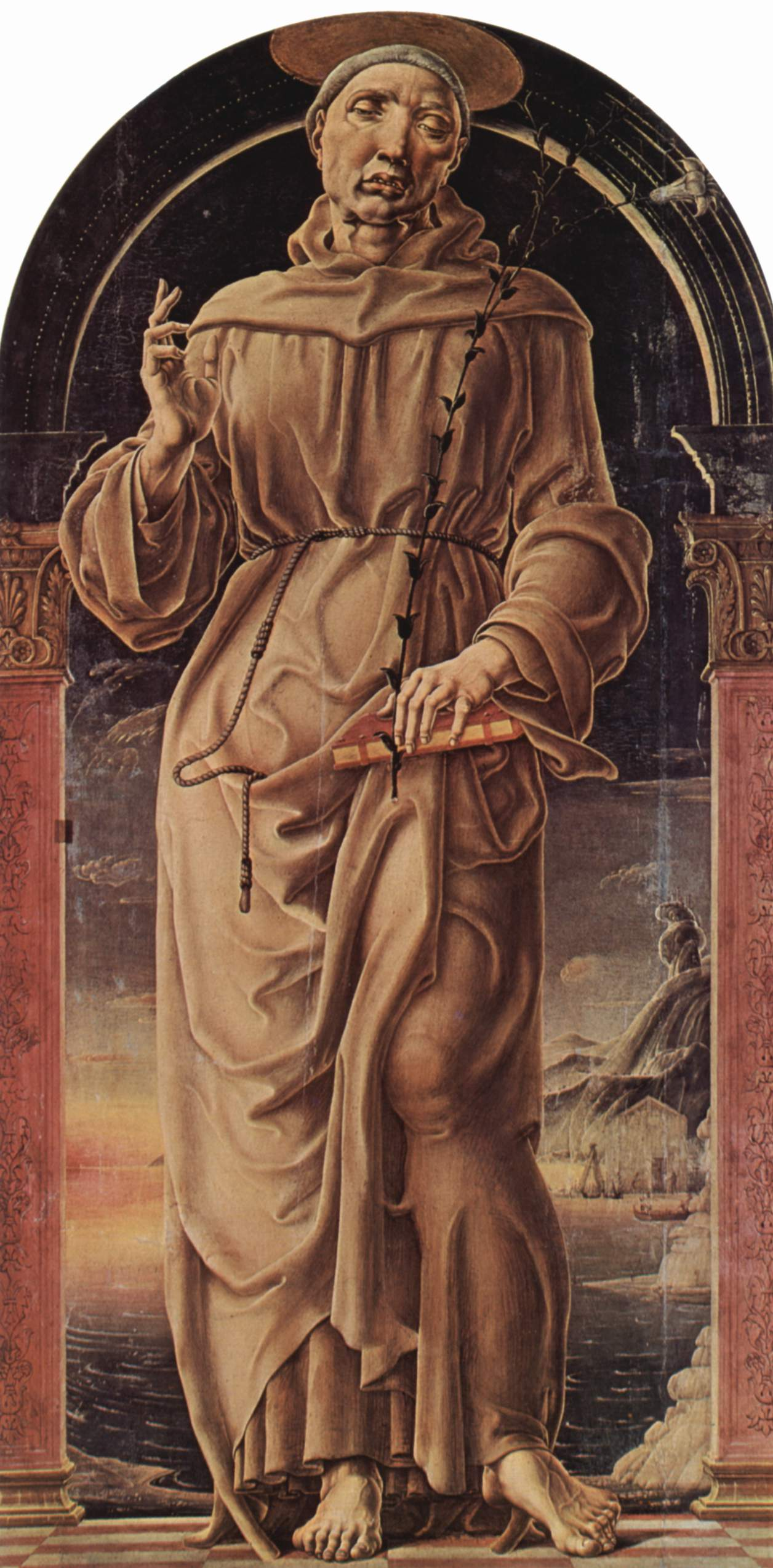
Cosmè Tura, Saint Anthony of Padua, 1484–88.

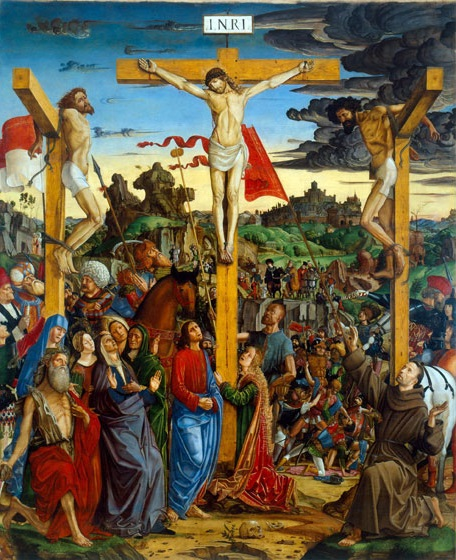
Francesco Bianchi Ferrari, Crucifixion, 1485–90.

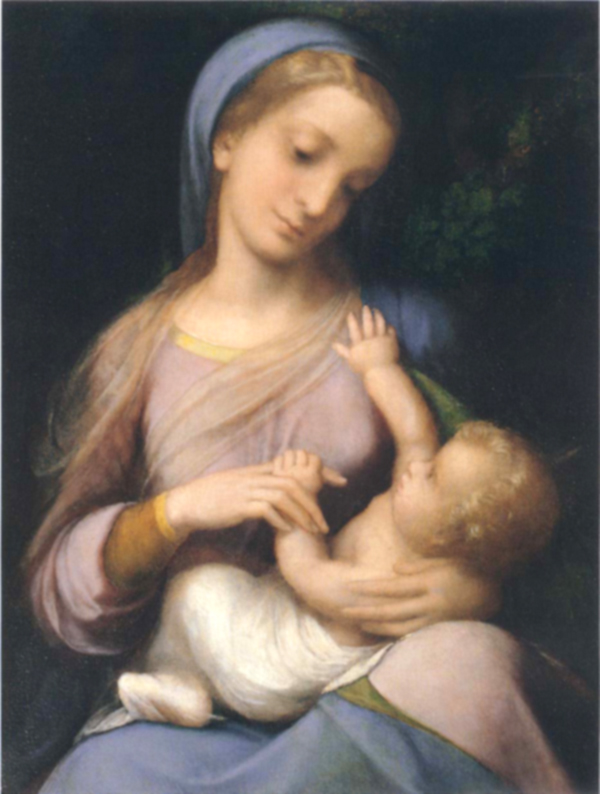
Correggio, Madonna Campori, 1517–8.

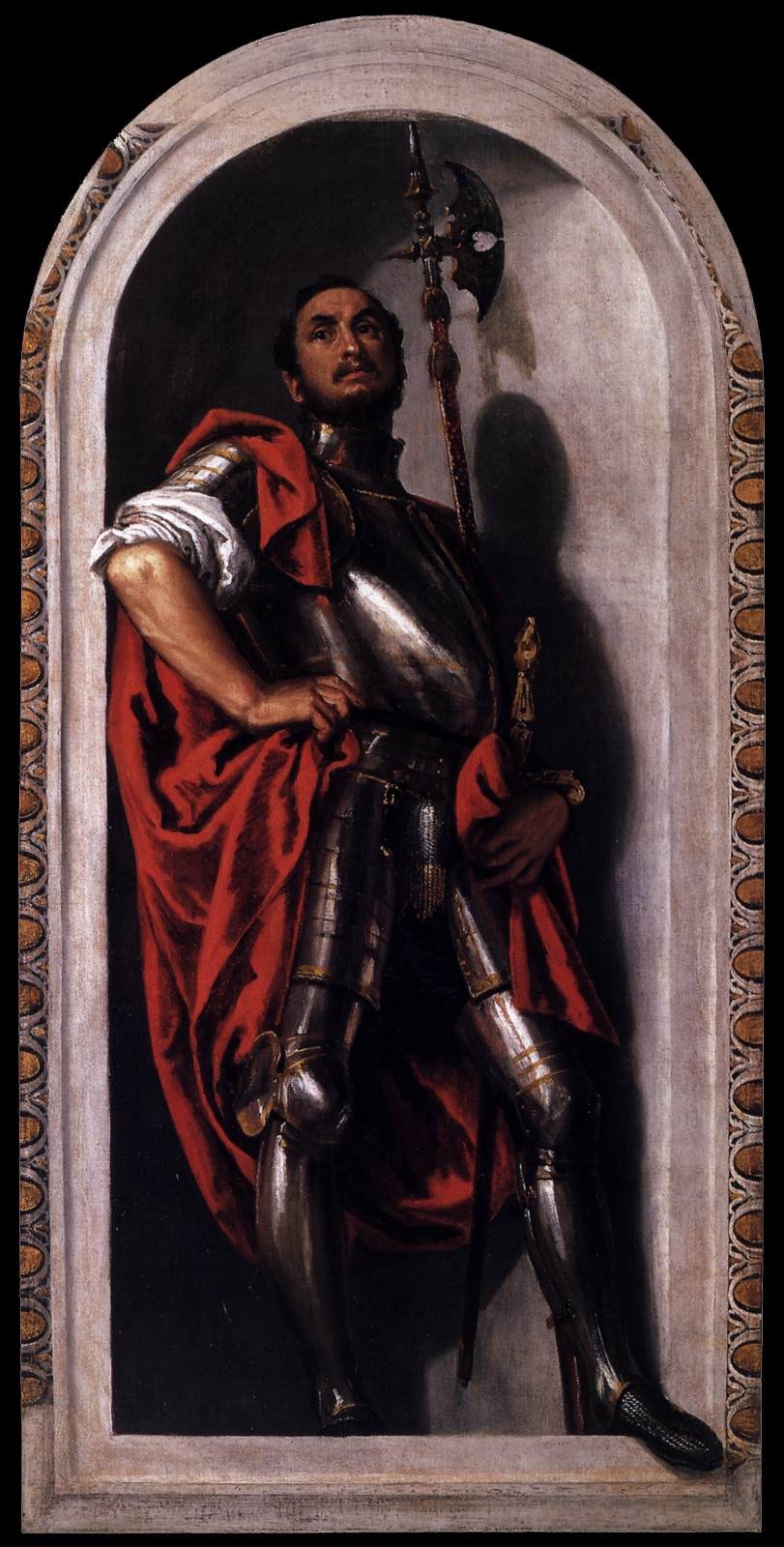
Paolo Veronese, Saint Menna, 1558–61.

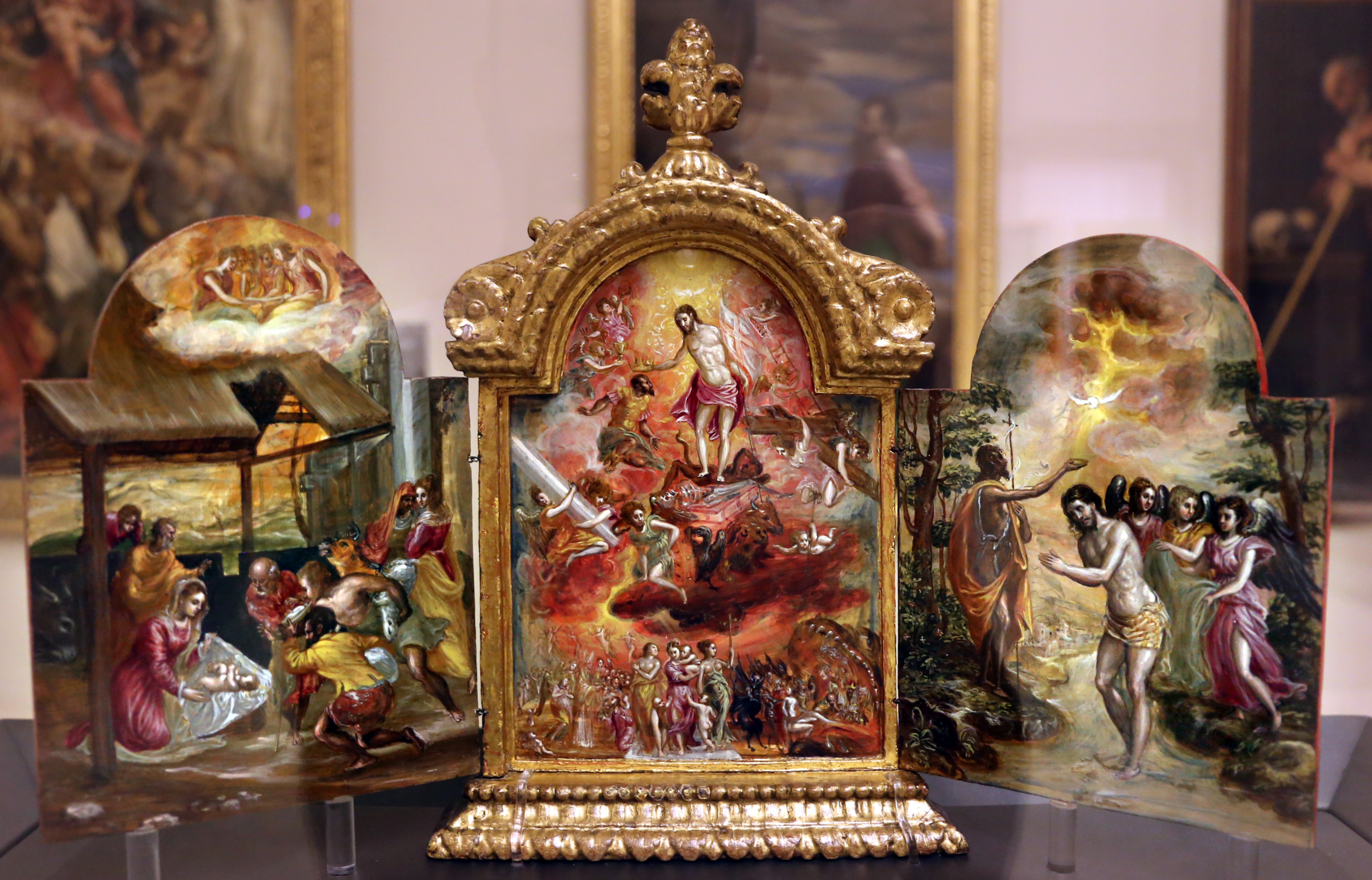
El Greco, Portable Altarpiece, 1567–8.

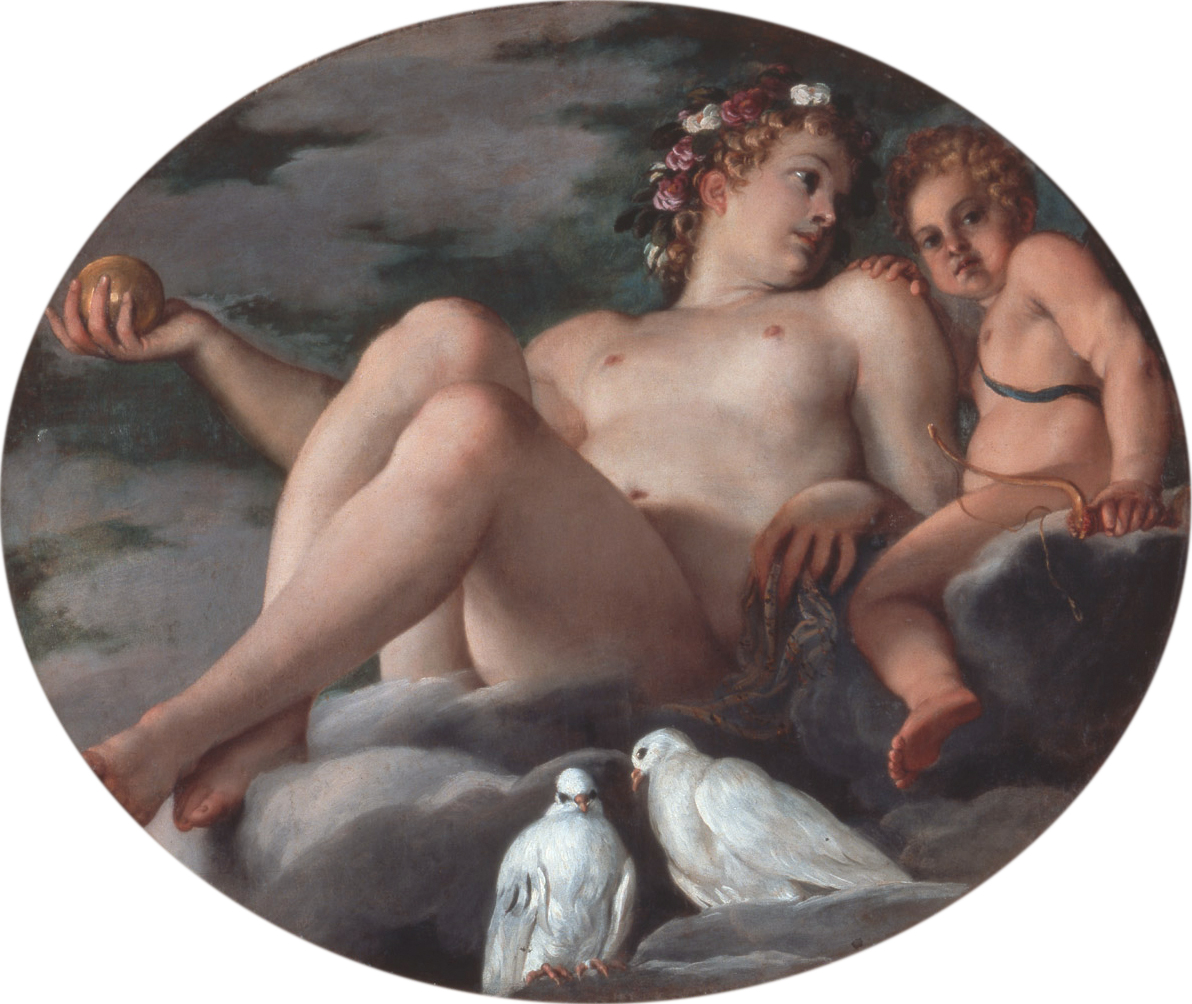
Annibale Carracci, Venus and Cupid, 1592.

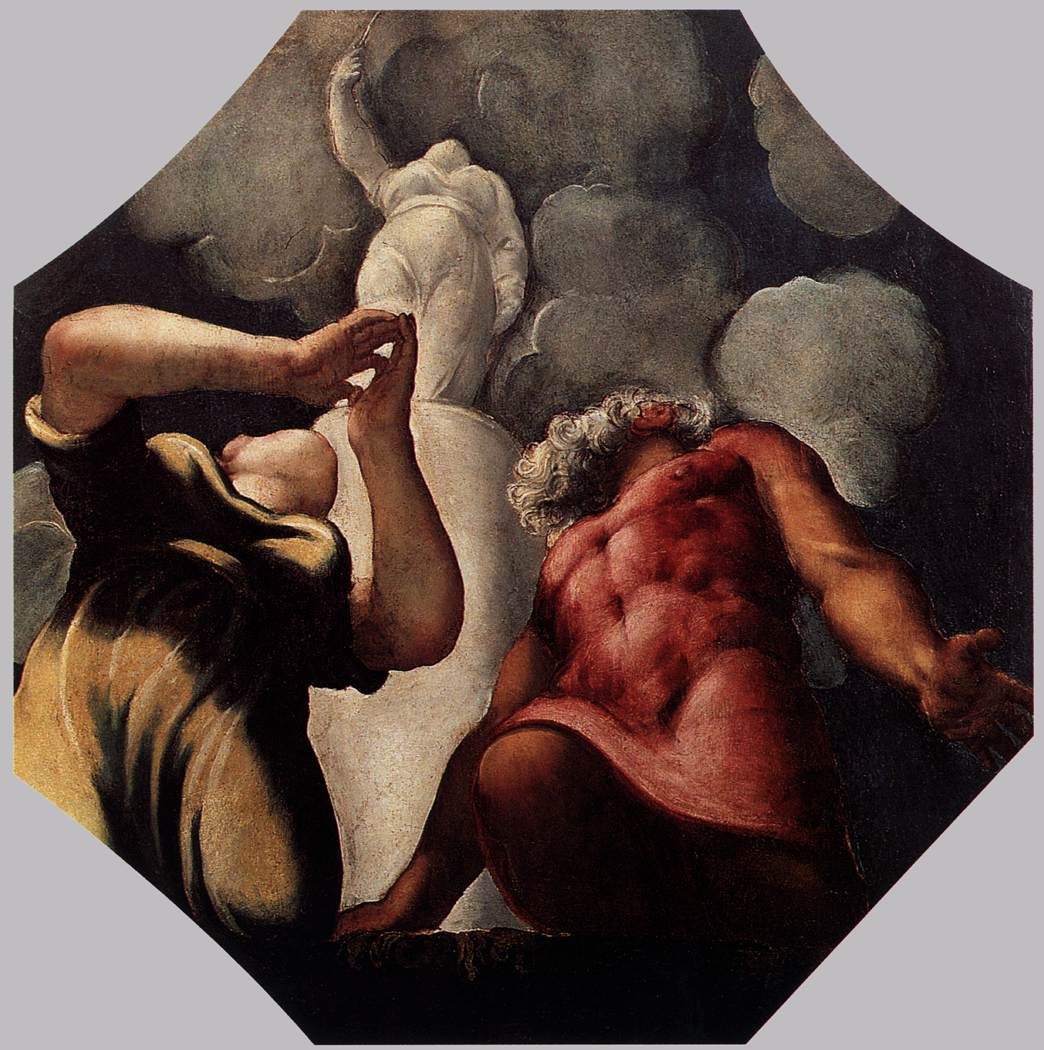
Jacopo Tintoretto, Scenes from Ovid's Metamorphoses, 1541–5.

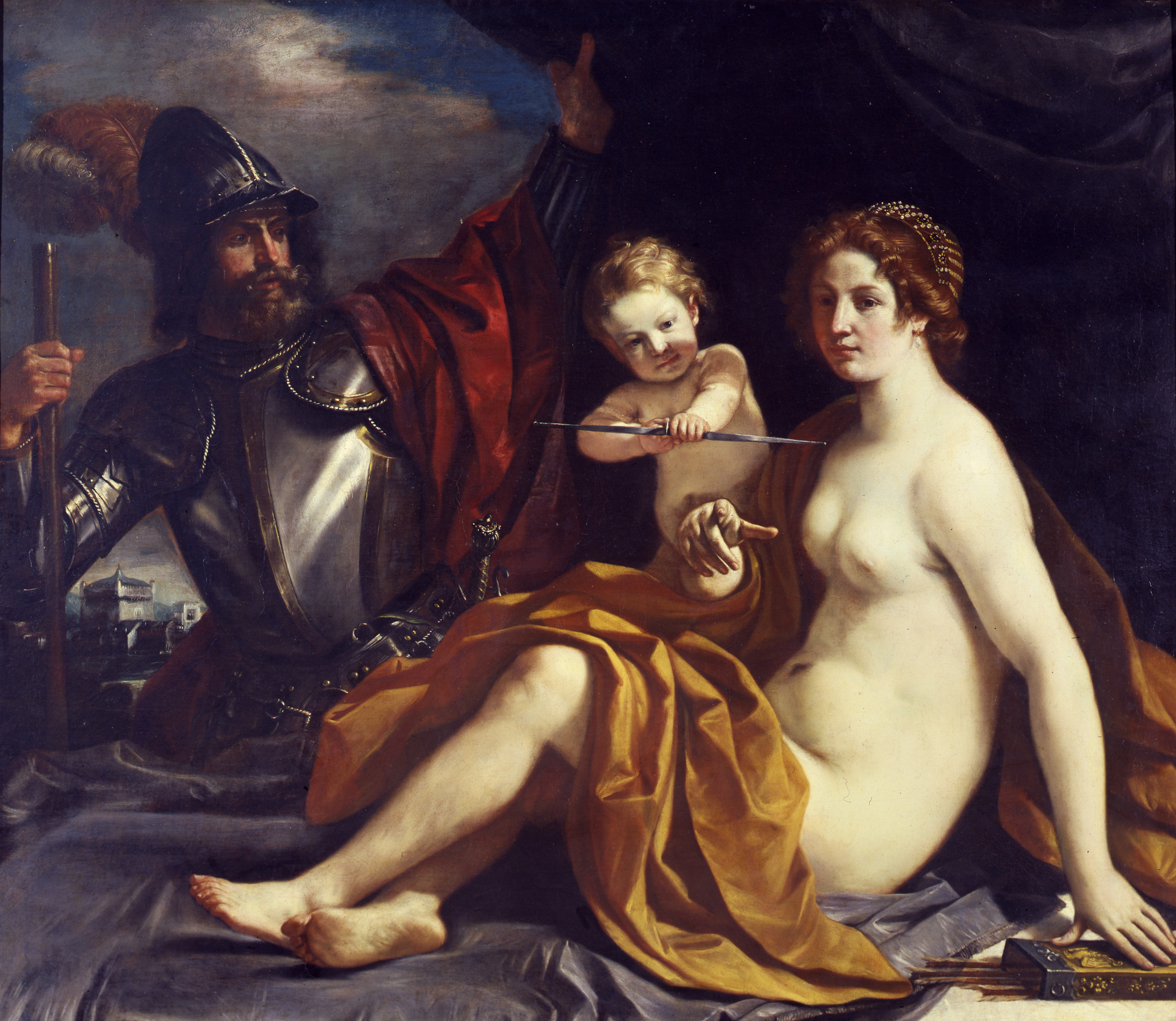
Guercino, Venus, Mars and Cupid, 1633.

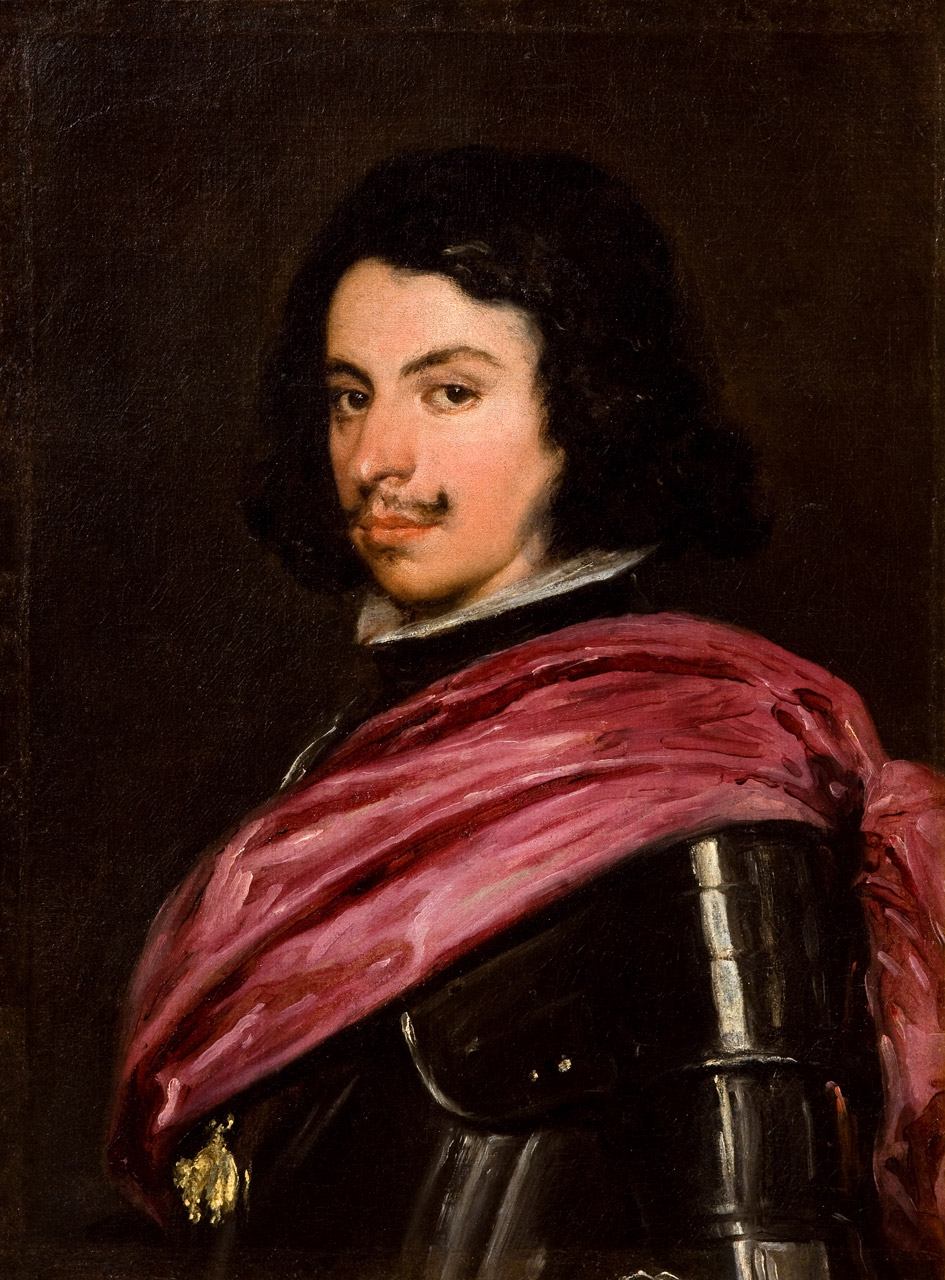
Diego Velázquez, Portrait of Francesco I d'Este, 1638.

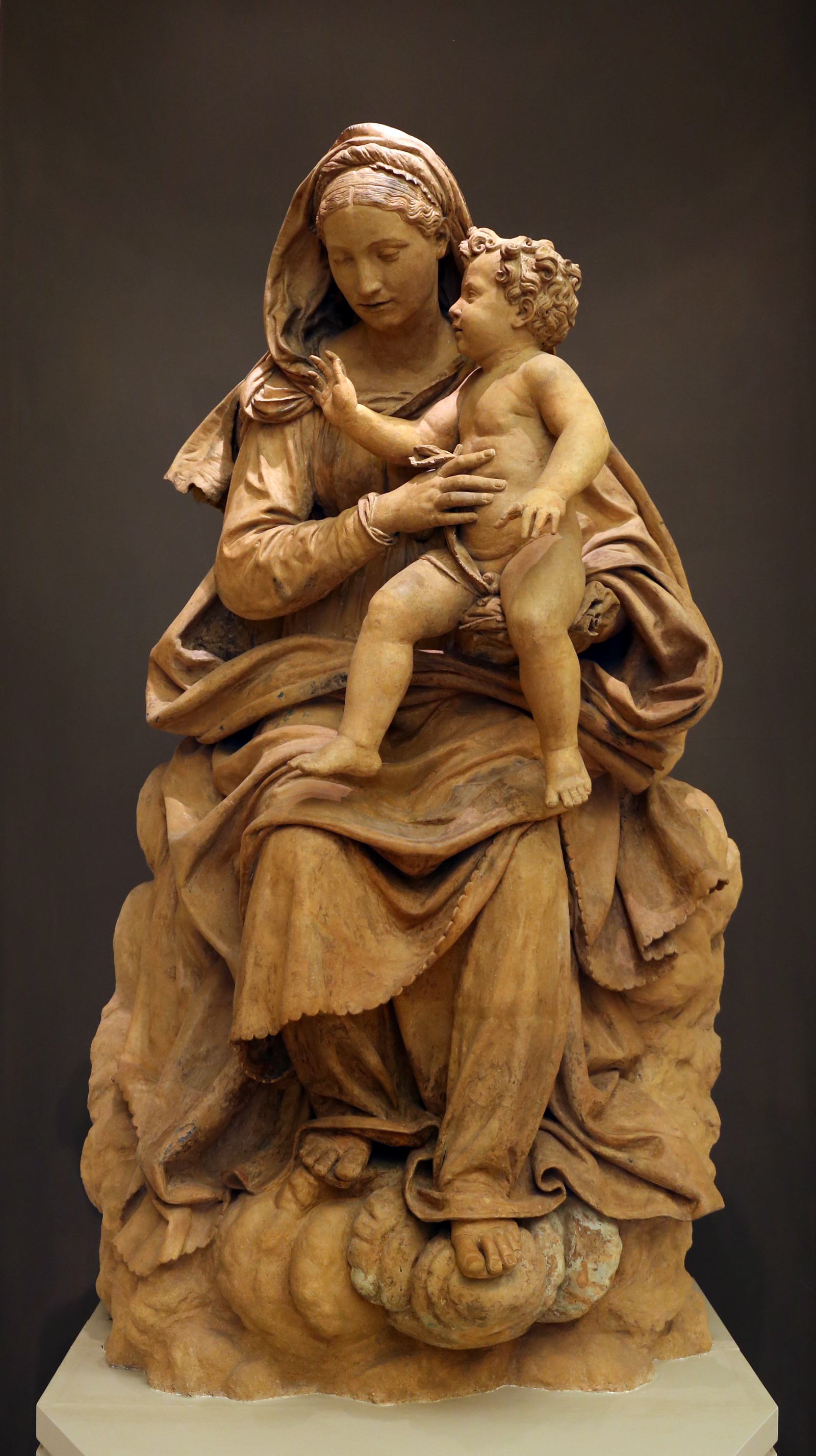
Antonio Begarelli, The Virgin and Child, c.1535.

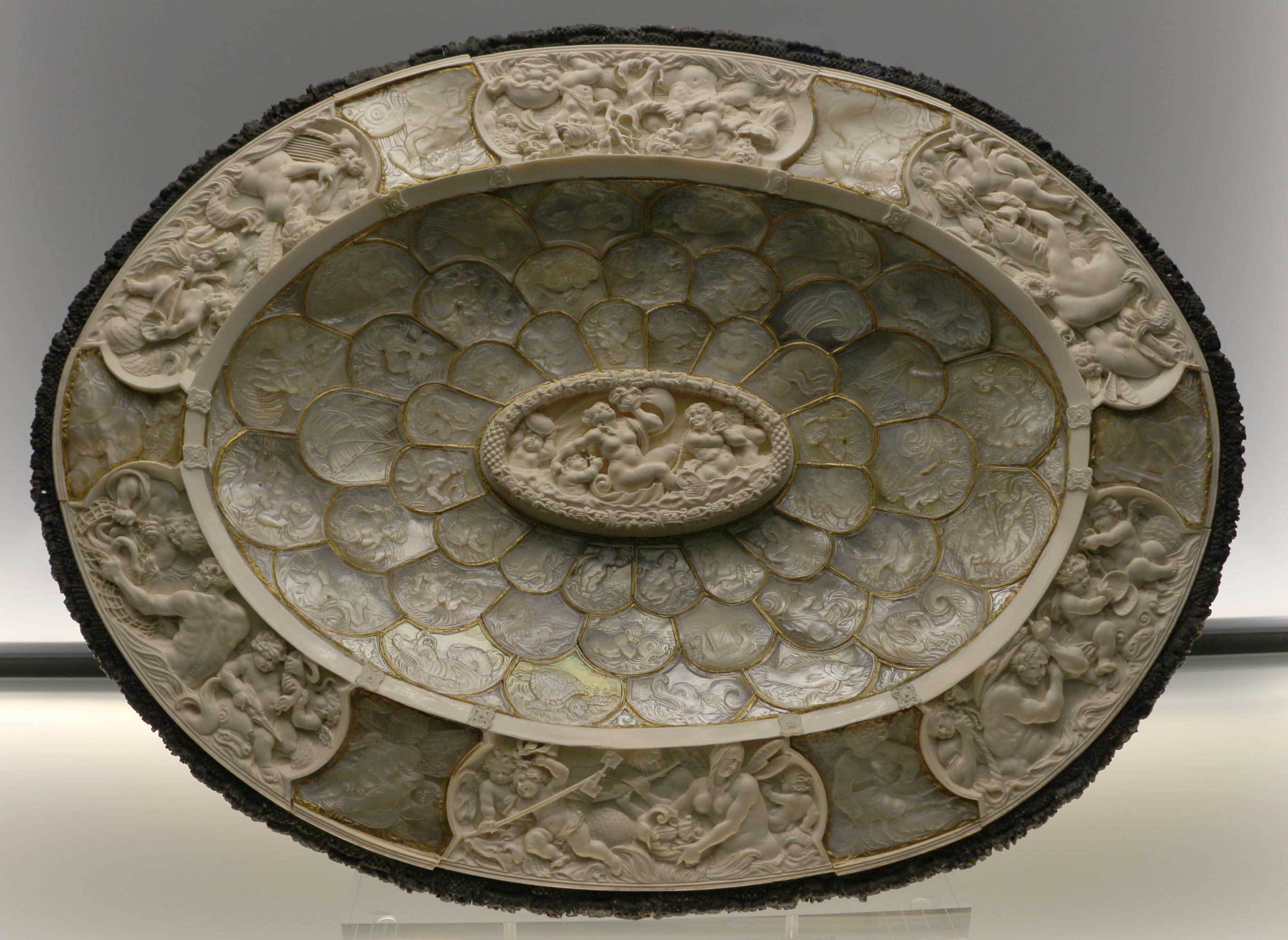
Ignaz Elhafen (?), Platter with sea scenes, 1670–80.

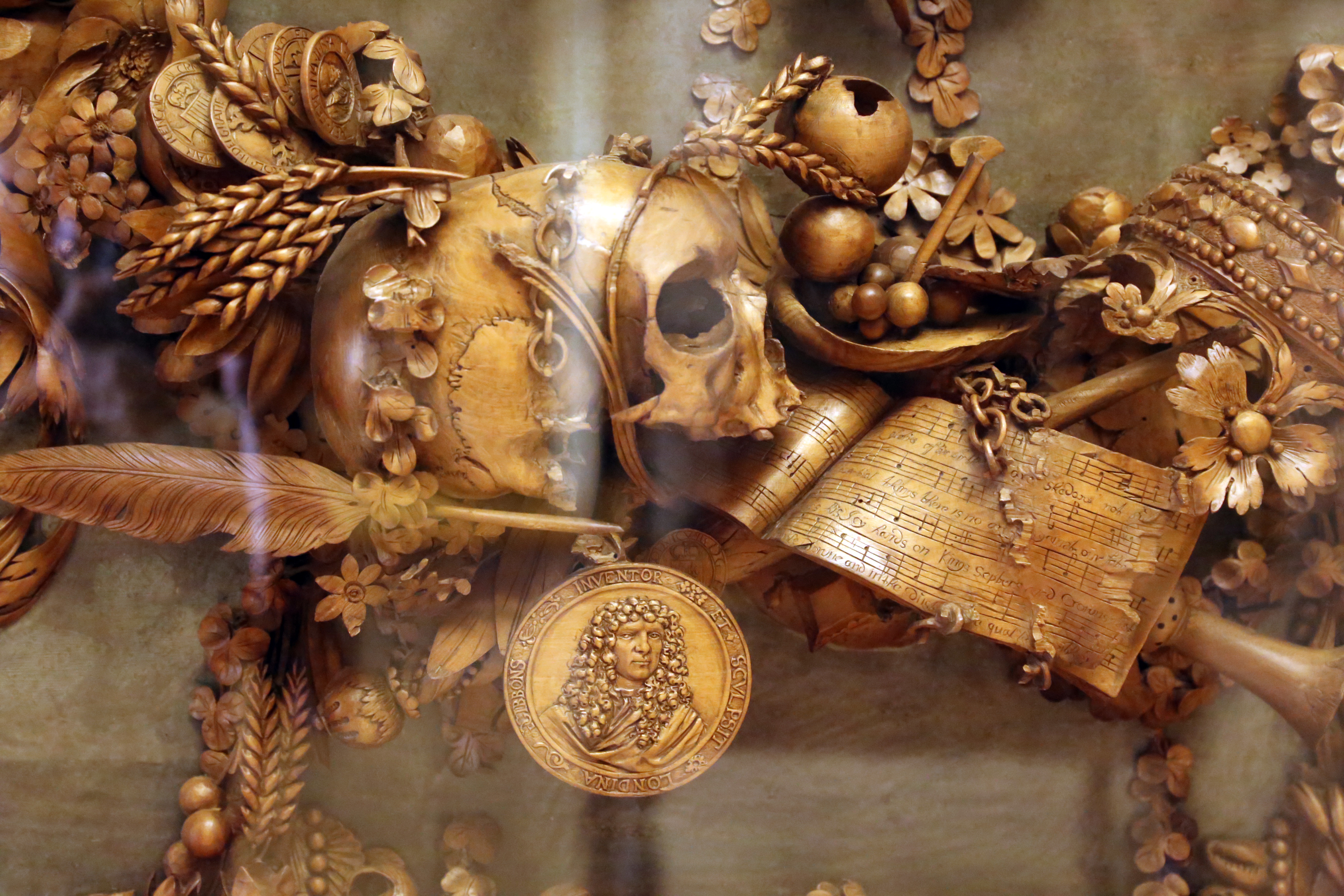
Grinling Gibbons, Vanitas, c.1685.

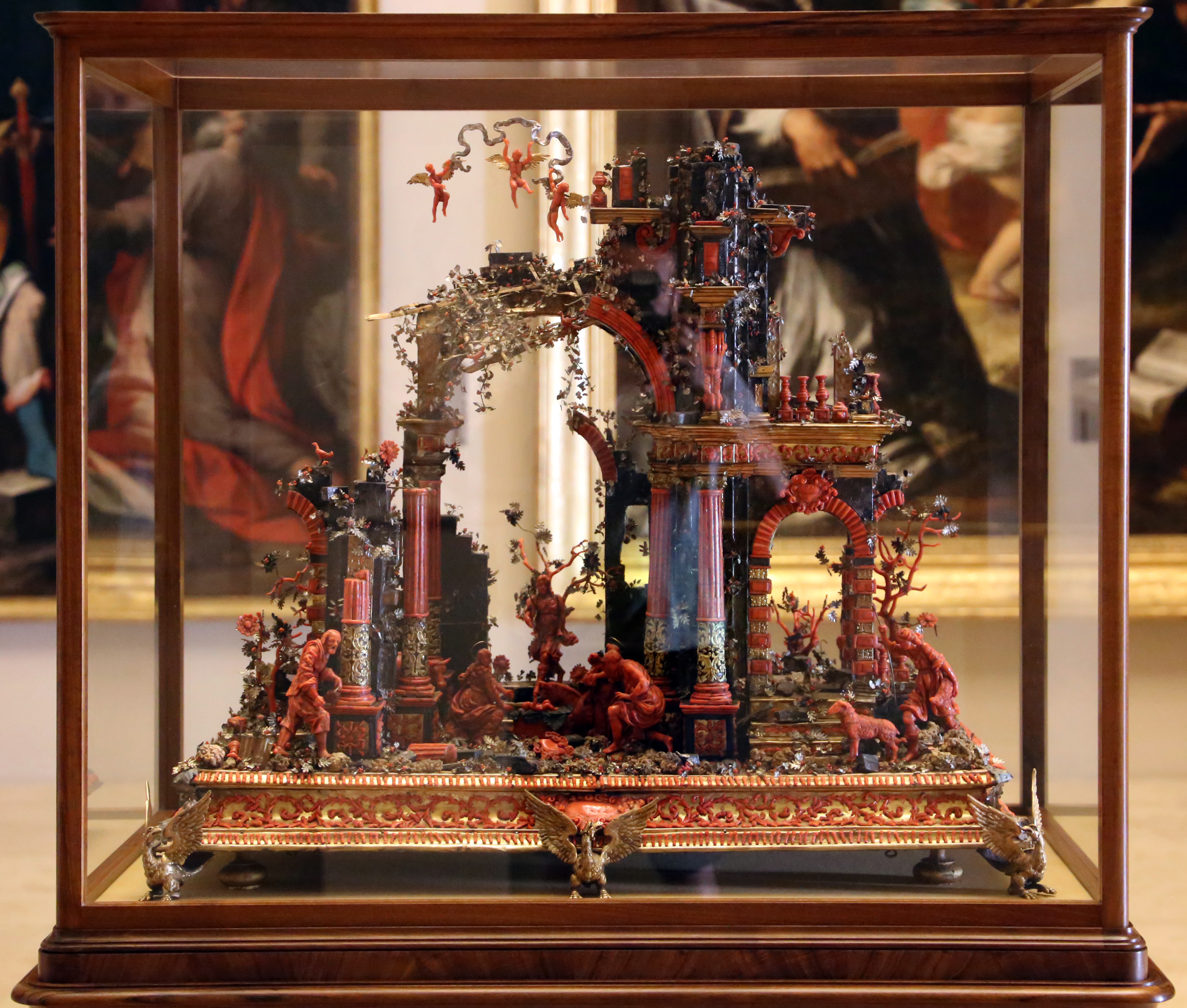
Trapani workshop, Nativity Scene, 18th century.

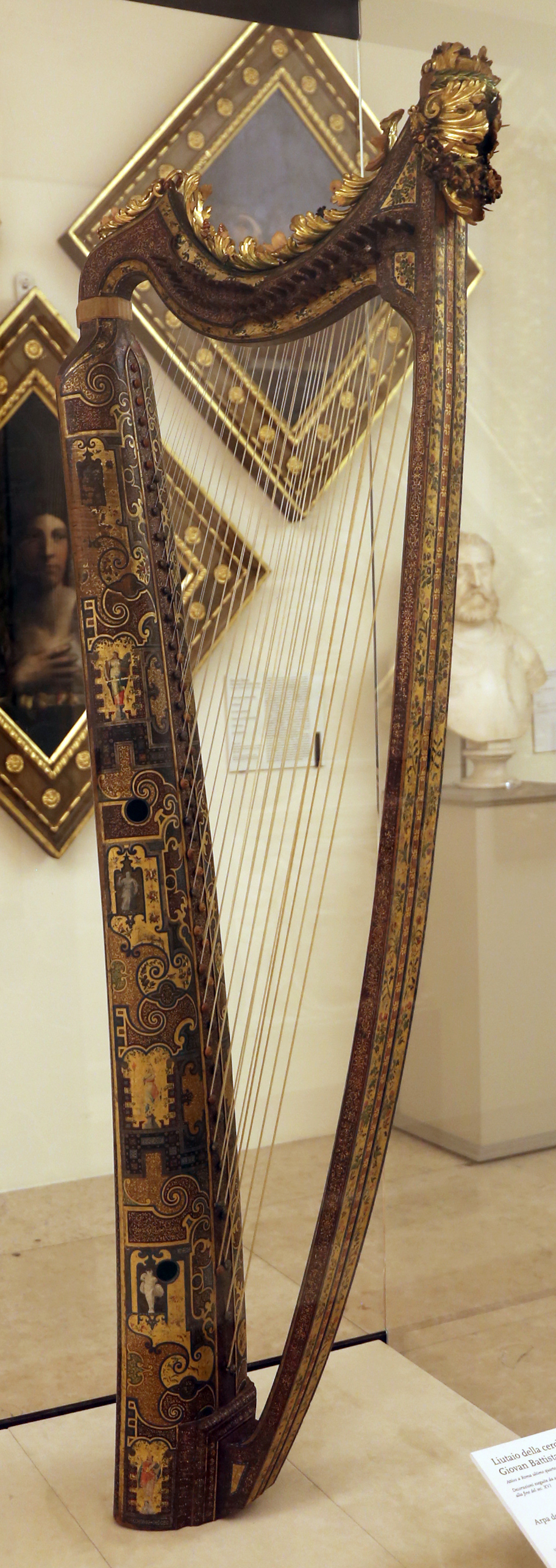
Giovanni Battista Giacometti, Giulio Marescotti, el Bastarolo, Estense Harp, 1581–93.

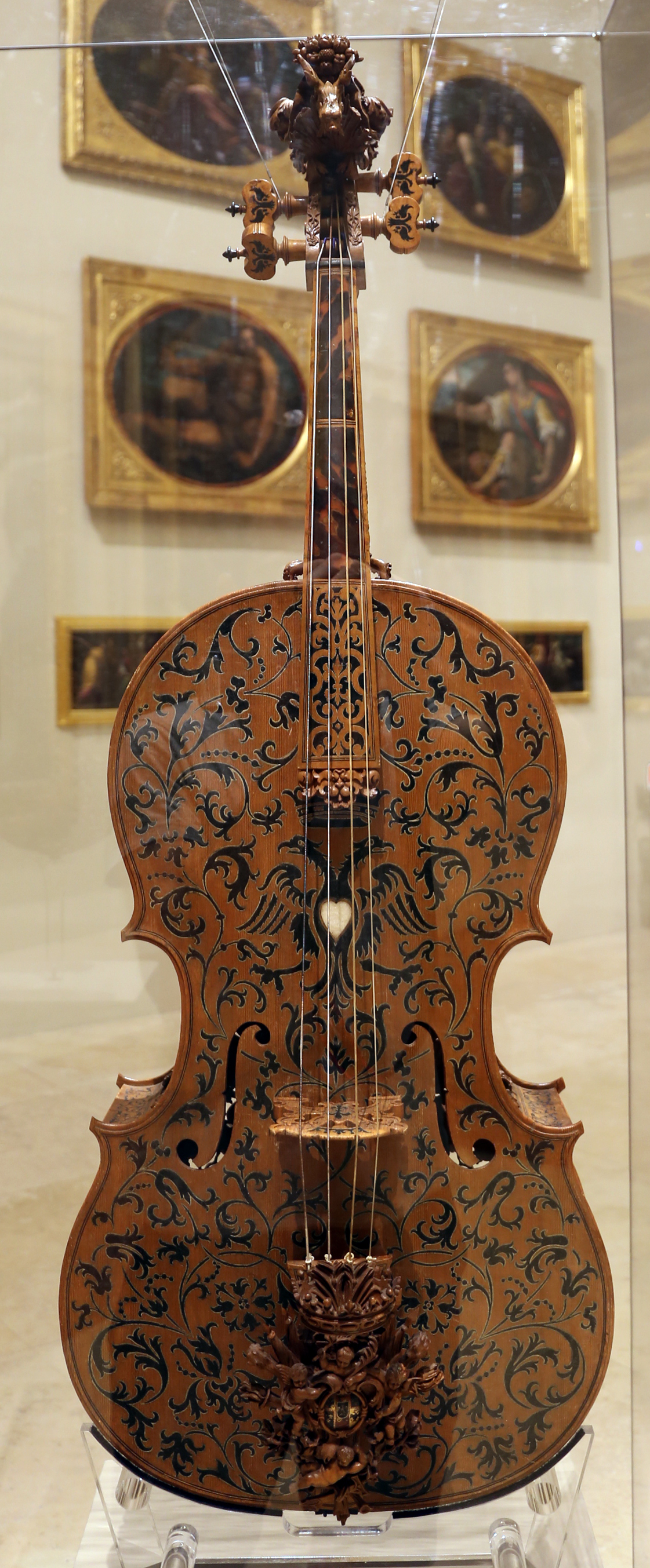
Domenico Galli, Cello, 1691.

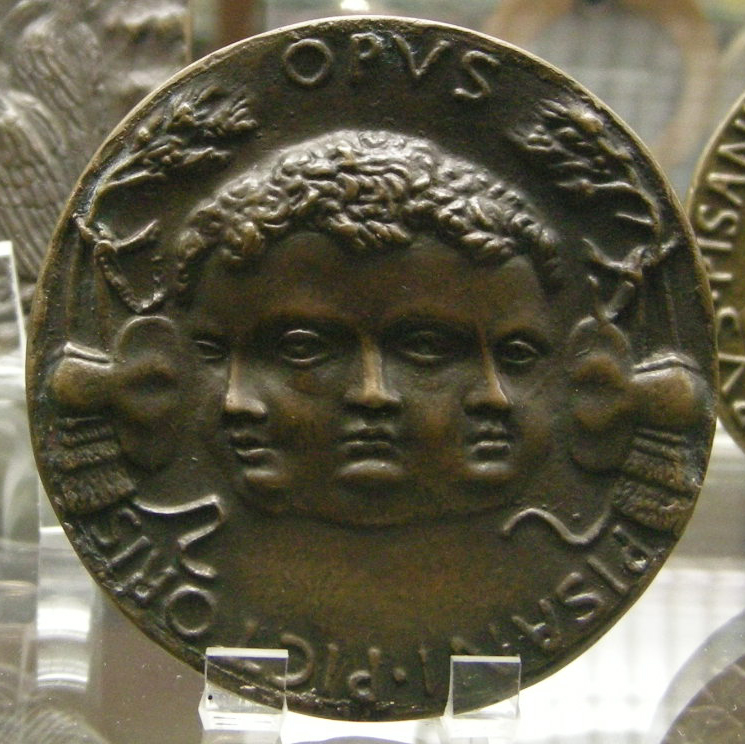
Pisanello, Medal of Leonello d'Este, c.1440.

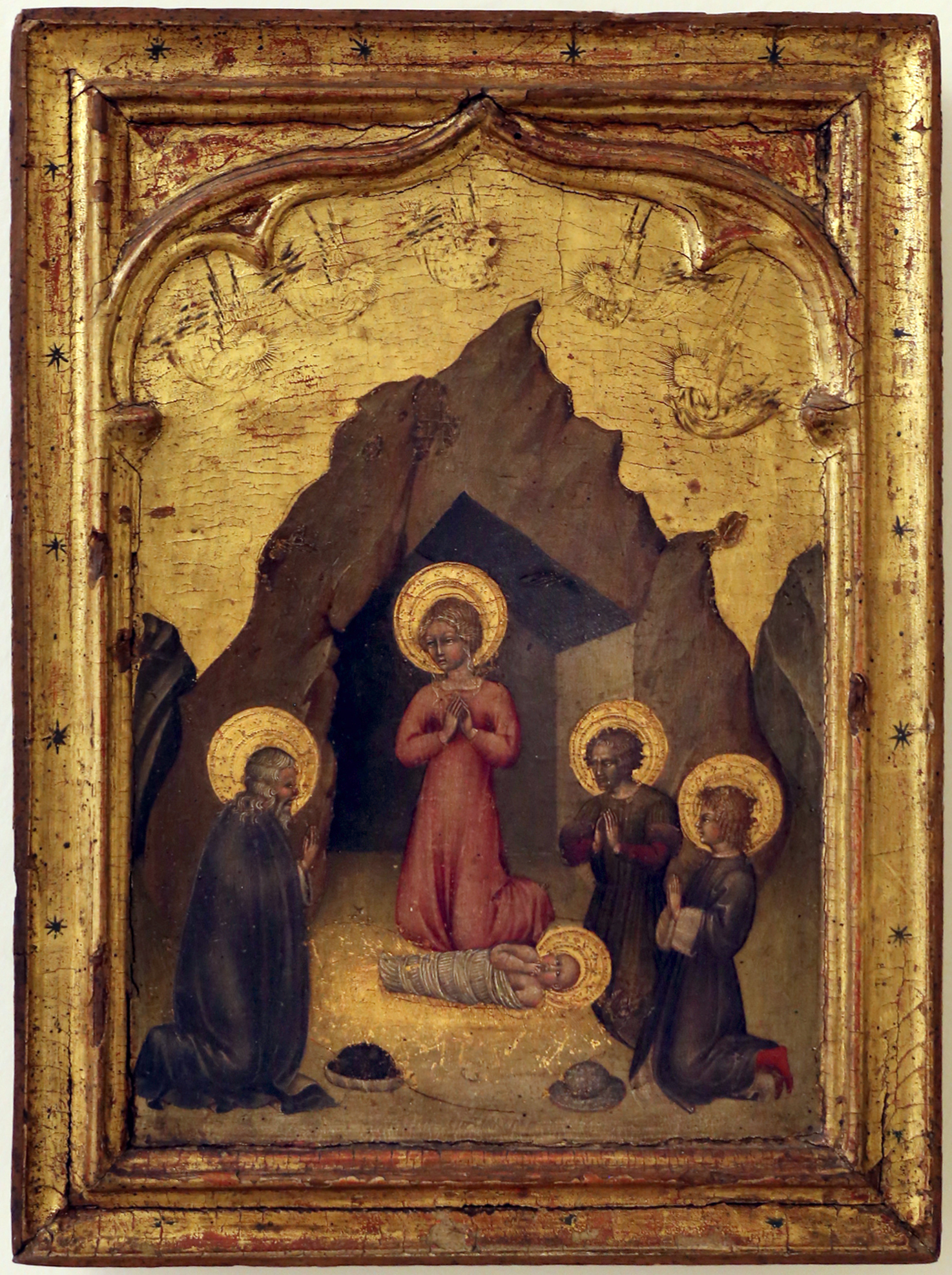
Giovanni di Paolo, Adoration of the Christ child, c.1430–40.

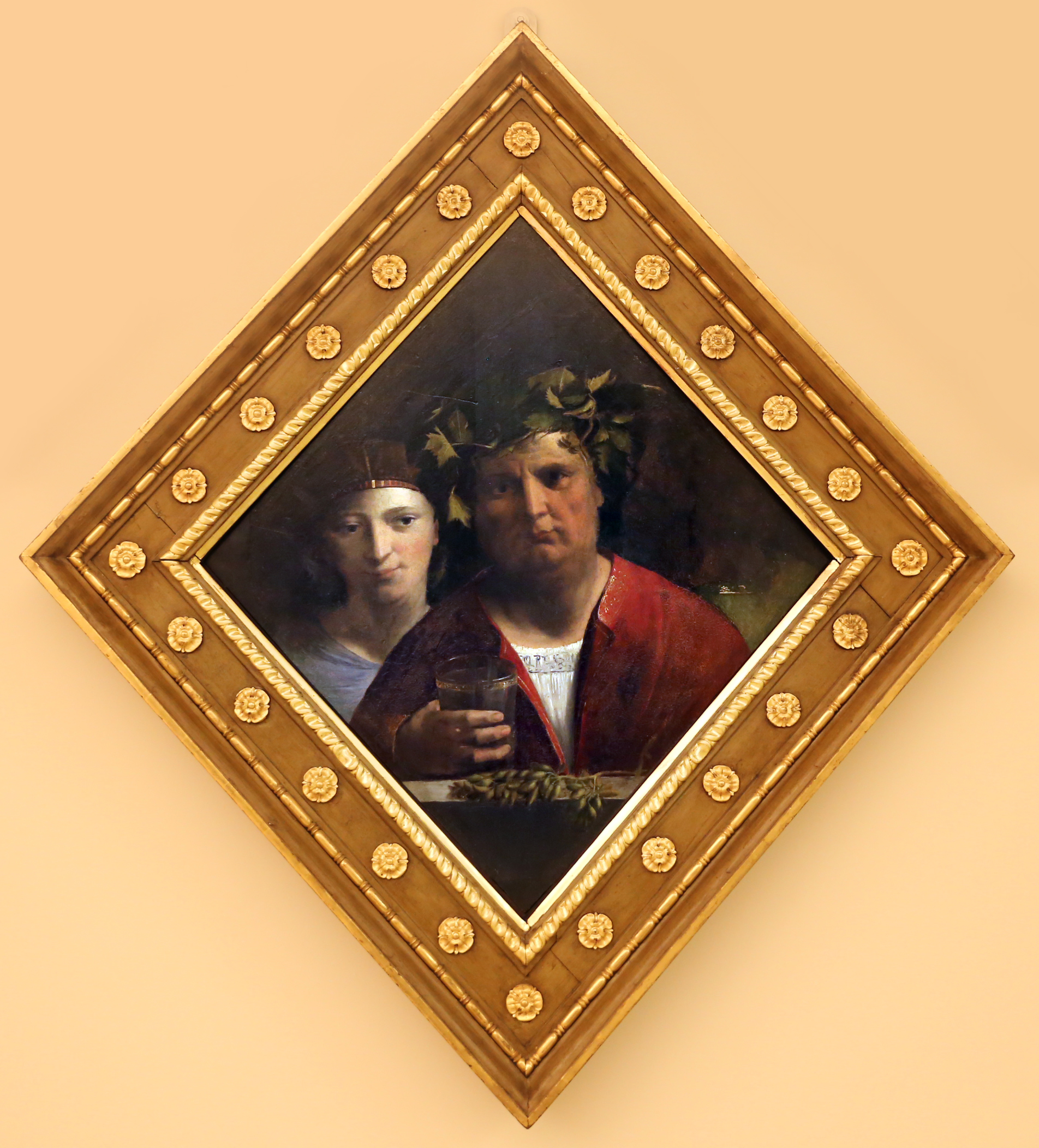
Dosso Dossi, The Ceiling of Alfonso I's Bedroom, 1520–22.

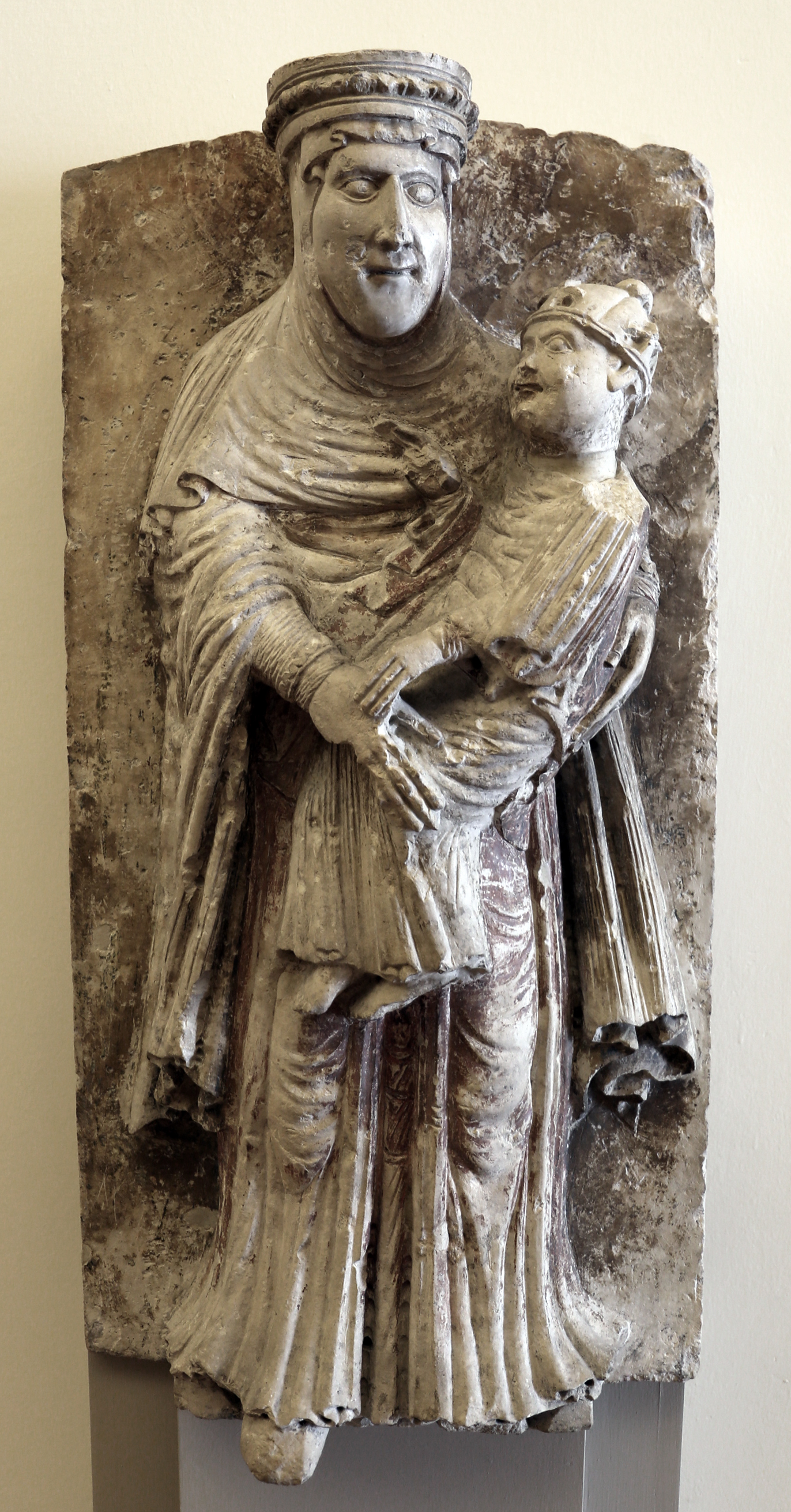
Madonna and Child, Wiligelmo, c.1100–20.

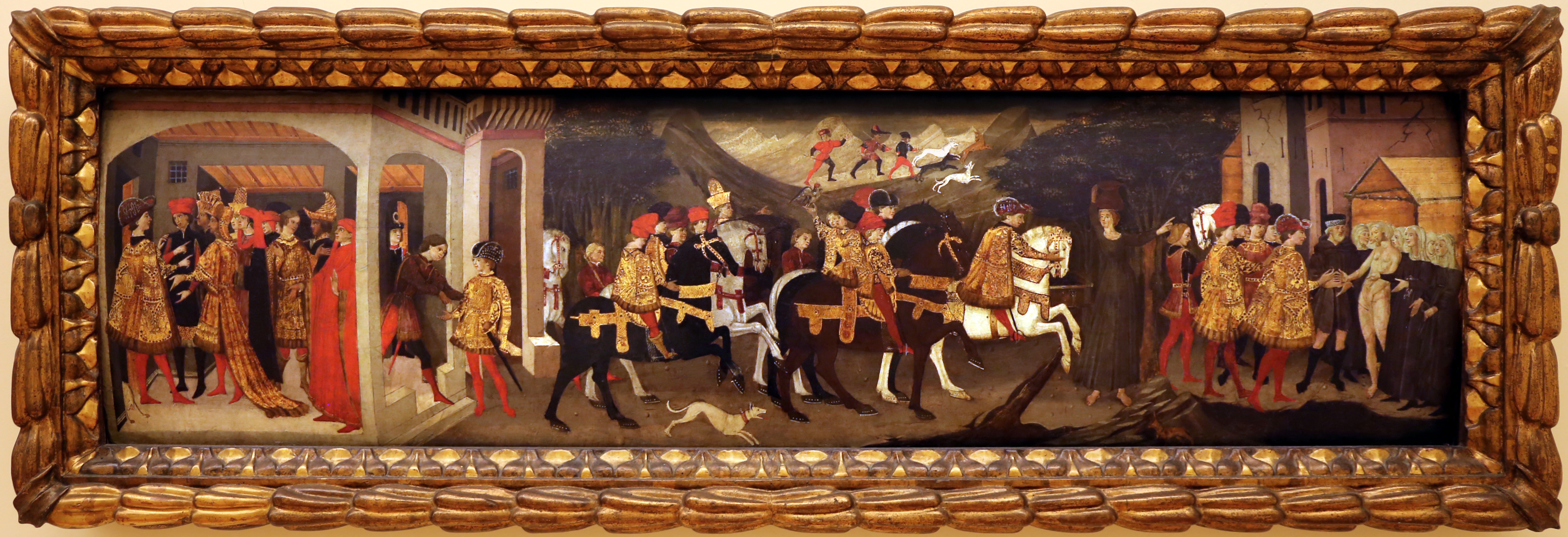
The Tale of Griselda, Apollonio of Giovanni, c.1440.

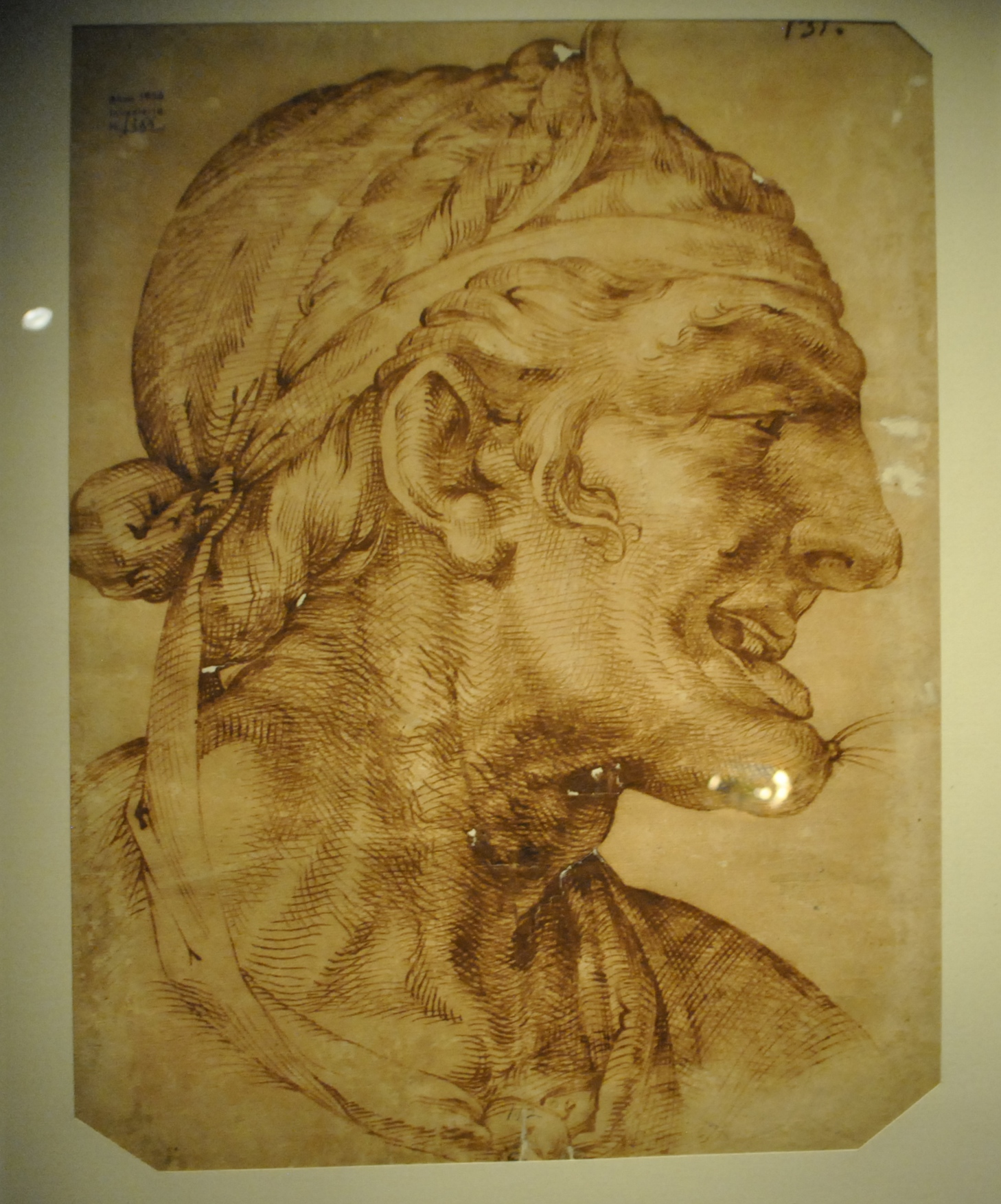
Head of an Old Woman Passerotti Bartolomeo, c.1575–80.

== Bibliography ==
- Luigi Amorth, Modena capitale: storia di Modena e dei suoi duchi dal 1598 al 1860, Martello Editore, Milano, 1973
- Jadranka Bentini, Disegni della Galleria Estense di Modena, Panini, Modena, 1989.
- Herman van Bergeijk, "The first half of the seventeenth century: from the castle to the palace" in The Ducal Palace of Modena, seven centuries of a city space, edited by A. Biondi, Modena 1987.
- Maria Grazia Bernardini, La Galleria Estense di Modena: guida storico-artistica, Cinisello Balsamo, Silvana Editoriale, 2006, ISBN 88-366-0680-6.
- Giorgio Bonsanti, Galleria Estense, Banca popolare di Modena, Modena, 1977
- Stefano Casciu (ed.), (trans. David Kerr),The Galleria Estense in Modena: a brief guide, Franco Cosimo Panini, Modena, 2015, ISBN 978-88-570-0901-8.
- Stefano Casciu; Sonia Cavicchioli; Elena Fumagalli, Modena barocca: Opere e artisti alla corte di Francesco I d'Este (1629–1658) Edifir Edizioni Firenze, Firenze, 2013.
- Luciano Chiappini, Gli Estensi, Collana Le grandi famiglie d'Europa, Edizioni Dall'Olio, Milano, 1967
- Alessandra Mottola Molfino; Mauro Natale; et al., Le Muse e il Principe. Arte di corte del Rinascimento Padano, catalogo della Mostra tenuta a Milano nel 1991, Franco Cosimo Panini Editore, Modena, 1991
- Angelo Namias, Storia di Modena e dei Paesi Circostanti, Arnaldo Forni Editore, Bologna, 1893.
- Giuseppe Panini, La famiglia Estense da Ferrara a Modena, Edizioni Armo, Modena, 1996
- Angelo Spaggiari e Giuseppe Trenti, The state of Modena: a capital, a dynasty, a civilization in the history of Europe, Vol. II, Istituto Poligrafico and Zecca dello Stato- Archivi Stato, Modena, 2001.
- Adolto Venturi, La Galleria Estense di Modena, Edizioni Panini, Modena, 1989.

== Related entries ==
- Gallerie Estensi
- Biblioteca Estense
- Estense Lapidary Museum
- Pinacoteca Nazionale in Ferrara
- Ducal Palace of Sassuolo
