= Francesco Bianchi (painter) =

Italian painter

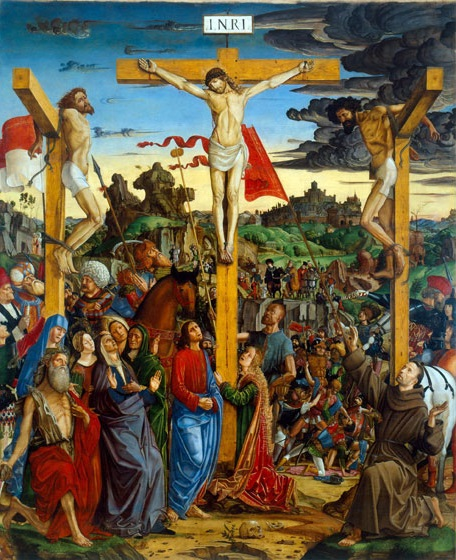
Crucifixion with St Jerome and St Francis (Galleria Estense, Modena)

Francesco Bianchi (1447 – 8 February 1510) was an Italian painter of the Renaissance period. He is also known as Francesco del Bianchi Ferrara and Il Frare. He was born at Ferrara. Modena is also mentioned as the place of his birth. His works were much esteemed in his time. He was a pupil of Cosimo Tura. He is said to have been an instructor of Correggio, but Bianchi would have died when the former was only 16 years old.

He was prolific in painting altarpieces in Modena, but few remain. The Louvre has a Virgin and Child enthroned with two Saints. A crowded Crucifixion with St Jerome and St Francis at the Galleria Estense of Modena is attributed to Bianchi.
