= Portrait of Francesco I d'Este =

Painting by Diego Velázquez

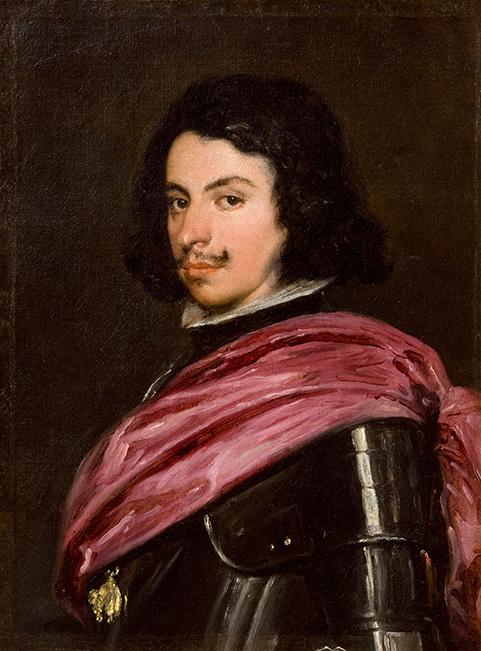
- Artist: Diego Velázquez
- Year: 1638-1639
- Medium: Oil on canvas
- Dimensions: 68 cm × 51 cm (27 in × 20 in)
- Location: Galleria Estense

Portrait of Francesco I d'Este is a 1638-1639 oil on canvas portrait of Francesco I d'Este, Duke of Modena by Diego Velázquez, commissioned for the Este collection and still in the Galleria Estense in Modena.

It was produced in Madrid during its subject's visit to the Spanish royal court and shows the Order of the Golden Fleece given him by the Spanish king. It toured to the Metropolitan Museum of Art in New York from 16 April to 14 July 2013 to raise awareness of the 2012 earthquake in Modena, which closed the Galleria Estense.
