= Corpus (Bernini) =

Sculpture cast by Bernini

- The Body (English)
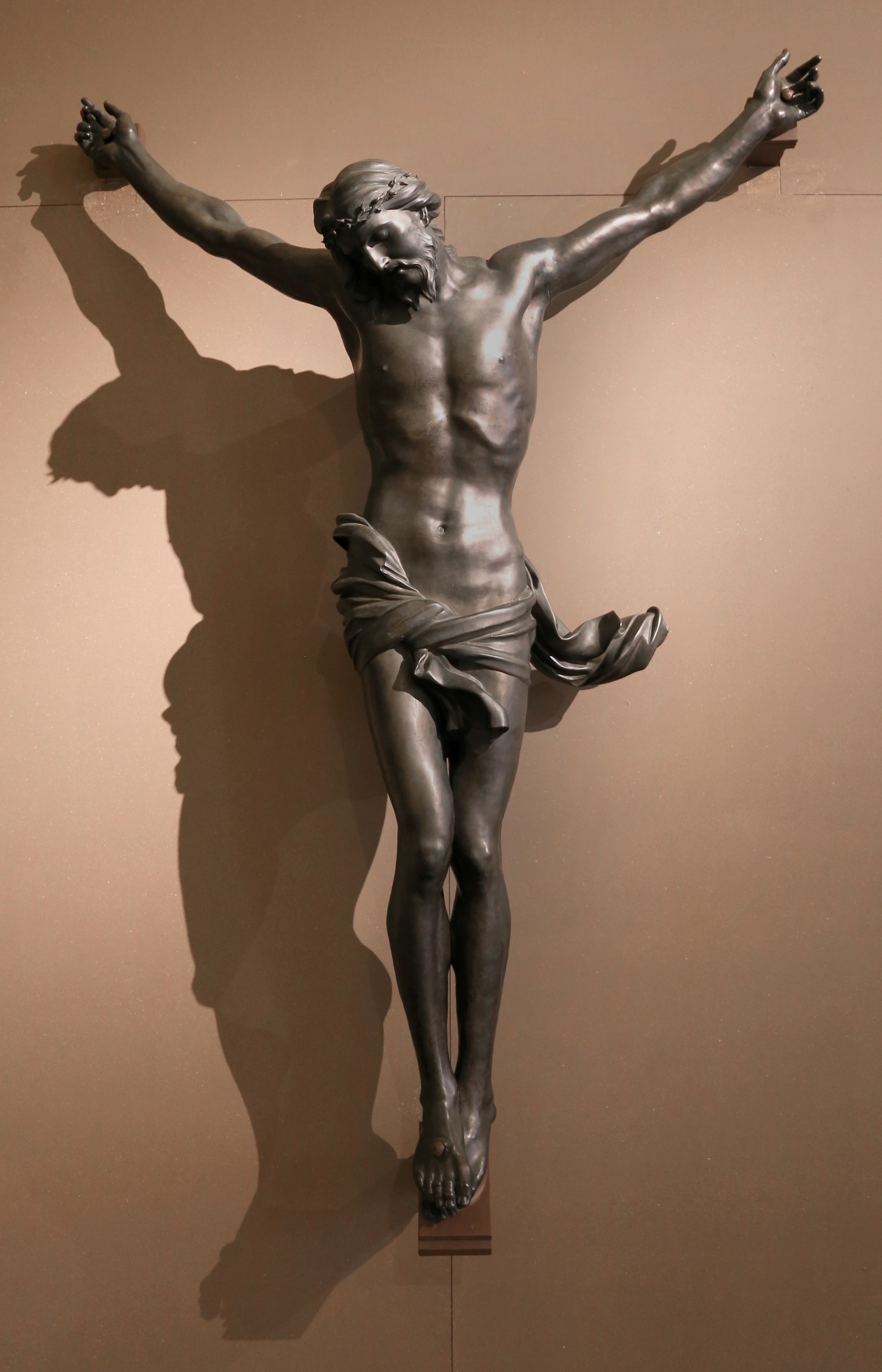
- Artist: Gian Lorenzo Bernini
- Year: 1655
- Catalogue: 57
- Type: Sculpture
- Medium: Bronze
- Subject: Jesus
- Dimensions: Life-size
- Location: Art Gallery of Ontario; Toronto
- Preceded by: Bust of Francesco I d'Este
- Followed by: Daniel and the Lion (Bernini)

Corpus (The Body) is a life-size bronze sculpture of the crucified Jesus by Gian Lorenzo Bernini. Cast in 1650, Bernini held onto it in his private collection for 25 years.

== History ==
Corpus is considered one of the artist's "long-lost masterpieces". It is believed that Bernini cast three versions of Corpus. One version was destroyed during the French Revolution, one belonged to the Spanish royal collection, and one that was recorded in the Perugia region of Italy in 1790 before going missing. The Corpus donated to the Art Gallery of Ontario in Toronto was long believed to have been cast by an unknown French artist. In 2004, following new scholarly studies of the work, Corpus was attributed to Bernini, who cast the sculpture for his personal collection.

After being "lost" for over one hundred years, Corpus surfaced in Venice in 1908. Later it fell into private hands in the United States, but by that time it was misidentified as a work from the school of Giambologna. At an auction in 1975, it failed to sell for the very low price of $200. It was not until 2002 that it was recognized as a Bernini. And it took until 2005 for the provenance to be definitely and directly linked to Bernini.

In January 2007, Toronto real estate developer Murray Frum negotiated to buy the sculpture from an art dealer in the United States, and then donated the sculpture to the Art Gallery of Ontario. Corpus is said to be worth $50 million in the current art market.

== See also ==
- List of statues of Jesus
- List of works by Gian Lorenzo Bernini
