= Bust of Francesco I d'Este =

Sculpture by Gian Lorenzo Bernini

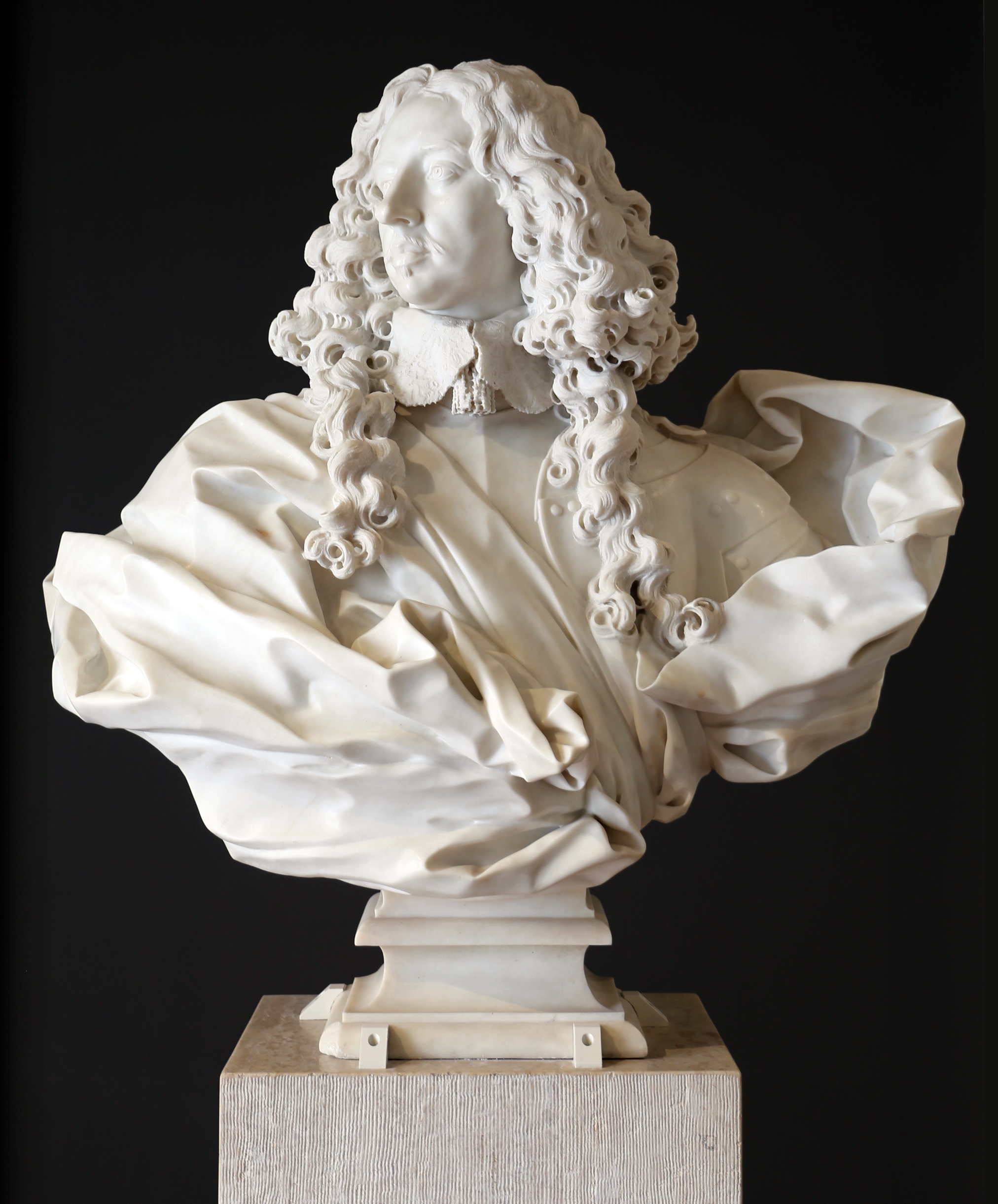
- Artist: Gian Lorenzo Bernini
- Year: 1650–1652
- Catalogue: 54
- Type: Sculpture
- Medium: Marble
- Dimensions: 100 cm (39 in)
- Location: Museo Estense; Modena
- Preceded by: Noli Me Tangere (Bernini)
- Followed by: Corpus (Bernini)

The Bust of Francesco I d'Este is a marble portrait bust by the Italian sculptor Gian Lorenzo Bernini. Completed in 1652, the work depicts Francesco I d'Este, Duke of Modena. It is in the Galleria Estense, Modena, Italy. The noble yet detached expression of the face, the extensive drapery and the lavish locks of hair are often taken to be emblematic of the way Bernini represented "absolute monarchs" as seemingly adopting superior poses, oblivious to their surroundings. A painting of the portrait bust, surrounded by various objects, undertaken by the artist Francesco Stringa in the late 1660s is in the Minneapolis Institute of Art.

== See also ==
- List of works by Gian Lorenzo Bernini
