= Giuseppe Zattera =

Italian painter (1826–1891)

Giuseppe Zattera (1826–1891) was an Italian painter, mainly depicting landscapes and vedute, but also some sacred subjects.

He was born in Legnago in the province of Verona, but studied from 1840 to 1852 at the Institute of Fine Arts of Modena under Adeodato Malatesta. He later became instructor at the academy in 1873.

Among his paintings were Tasso encounters his sister in Sorrento (1847). He painted an altarpiece depicting San Pasquale Baylon (1854) for the Church of the Osservanza of Cesena, now moved to the church of Santa Maria delle Assi in Modena. He also painted a St Francis de Sales (1860) for the church of San Francesco, Reggio. He painted a Holy Trinity and Saints for the Duomo of Villafranca, province of Verona.

Among his genre subjects were Le crestaie modenesi (1873) and La danza delle ore, now in the Galleria Estense in Modena.

He painted a Holy Family for the church of San Barnaba and an Arcangelo Raffaello for San Vicenzo, Modena. He also painted a Morte di Zerbino, Il Monte Aventino, Lago di Como, Allegoria di Pittura, and La Primavera (1883). He painted icons of Santa Monica and St John of the Cross.
