= Bartolomeo Bonascia =

Italian painter

Bartolomeo Bonascia was an Italian painter of the Renaissance period. He was known to be active since 1468 and died in 1527. He painted a Pietà, dated 1485, in the Estense Gallery in Modena.

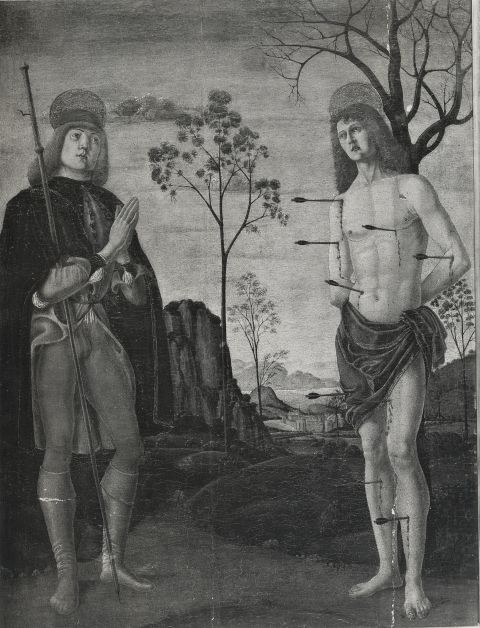
Bonascia Bartolomeo, San Rocco e san Sebastiano
