= Giovanni Battista Ingoni =

Italian painter

Giovanni Battista Ingoni (1528–1608) was an Italian painter, of the late Renaissance, active in his native Modena, Italy.

He is not highly regarded by Giorgio Vasari, who describes him as a rival of Nicolo Abati and active also in Rome, Parma, and Perugia. There is a large canvas of the baptism of Christ in the Galleria Nazionale di Parma. He painted one of the altarpieces in San Pietro, Modena.
