= Alberto Fontana =

Alberto Fontana may refer to:

- Alberto Fontana (painter) (died 1558), painter from Modena
- Alberto Fontana (footballer, born 1967), Italian goalkeeper
- Alberto Fontana (footballer, born 1974), Italian goalkeeper
- Alberto Fontana, known professionally as Alberto Naska, Italian racing driver
