= Gherardo =

Gherardo is a given name. Notable people with the name include:

- Gherardo Appiani (1370–1405), the lord of Piombino from 1398 until his death
- Gherardo Bosio (1903–1941), Italian architect, engineer and urbanist
- Gherardo III da Camino (1240–1306), Italian feudal lord and military leader
- Giovanni Gherardo Dalle Catene (1520–1533), Italian painter of the Renaissance
- Gherardo Cibo (1512–1600), artist and a herbalist from Italy
- Gherardo Colombo (born 1946), Italian former magistrate and judge
- Gherardo da Cremona (1114–1187), Italian translator of scientific books from Arabic into Latin
- Gherardo D'Ambrosio (1930–2014), Italian magistrate and politician
- Gherardo di Giovanni del Fora (1445–1497), Italian painter
- Maffeo Gherardo (1406–1492), Italian Roman Catholic bishop and cardinal
- Gherardo Gossi (born 1958), Italian cinematographer
- Gherardo della Notte (1592–1656), Dutch Golden Age painter
- Gherardo Perini, model for Michelangelo who came to work for him around 1520
- Gherardo Segarelli (1240–1300), the founder of the Apostolic Brethren
- Gherardo Silvani (1579–1675), Italian architect and sculptor
- Gherardo Hercolani Fava Simonetti (born 1941), the Grand Commander of the Sovereign Military Order of Malta
- Gherardo Starnina (1360–1413), Italian painter from Florence in the Quattrocento era

== See also ==
- Fra Gherardo, opera in three acts composed by Ildebrando Pizzetti who also wrote the libretto
- Gerard
- Gerardo
