= Boiardo =

Boiardo is an Italian surname.

Notable people with the surname include:

== People ==
- House of Boiardo, an aristocratic house holding the Countdom of Scandiano
  - Feltrino Boiardo, Count of Scandiano (15th century), father of Giulia Boiardo; grandfather of Giovanni Pico della Mirandola and Galeotto I Pico
  - Giulia Boiardo (15th century), daughter of Feltrino Boiardo, Count of Scandiano; mother of Giovanni Pico della Mirandola and Galeotto I Pico
  - Giulio Boiardo, Count of Scandiano (16th century) subject of the Niccolò dell'Abbate painting Portrait of a Couple
  - Matteo Maria Boiardo (1440–1494), Italian Renaissance poet
- Carlo Bojardo, 15th century bishop of the Roman Catholic Archdiocese of Modena-Nonantola
- Nicolò Boiardo, 15th century bishop of the Roman Catholic Archdiocese of Modena-Nonantola
- Richard Boiardo (1890–1984; born Ruggiero Boiardo), American mobster

== Fictional characters ==
- Saverio Guerri "Boiardo", a character from the 2010s Italian web TV series Suburra: Blood on Rome

== See also ==
- Boiardi, an Italian surname
- Bojardi, an Italian surname
- The dictionary definition of boiardo at Wiktionary
