= Ercole Setti =

Italian engraver and painter

Ercole Setti (c.1530–1618) was an Italian engraver and painter of the late-Renaissance period.

Setti was born in Modena. His pen-and-ink drawings show a fine draughtsmanship without requiring cross-hatching. Like the later Gaetano Zompini, he made a series of engravings of types of merchants of his time. One of his paintings, 'Sant' Orsola e le Vergini Compagne', hangs in Chiesa San Pietro in Modena.
