= Ercole dell'Abate =

Italian painter

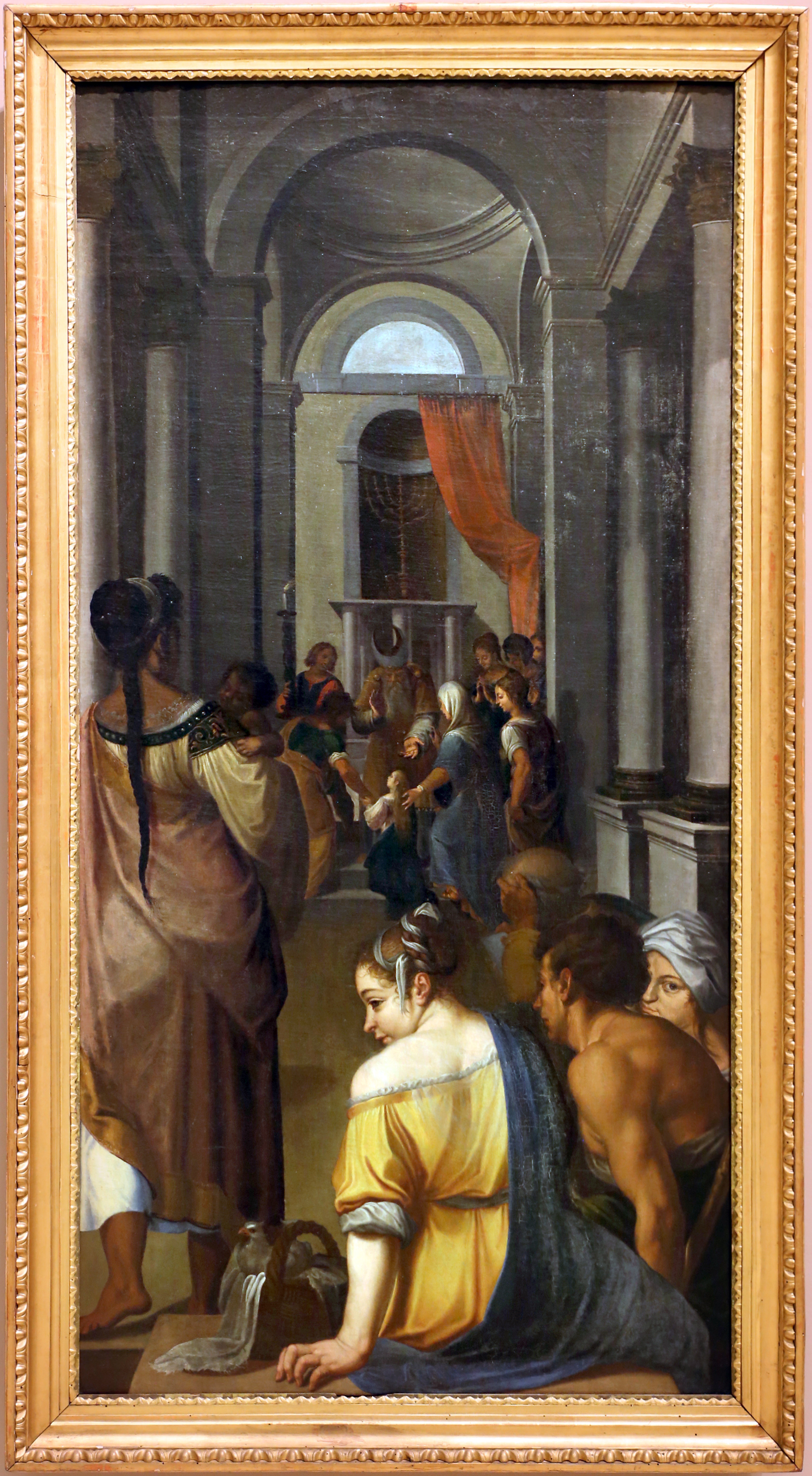
Virgin Mary presented to the Temple, Galleria Estense

Ercole dell'Abate or dell'Abbate (1573–1613) was an Italian mannerist painter in his native Modena. In English, his name is sometimes given as Ercole Abbate, Abate or Abati.

The eldest son of Giulio Camillo dell' Abbate, and grandson of Niccolo, Ercole was born at Modena about the year 1563. His father, Pietro Paolo, was also a painter. Ercole's first works date from 1596. He possessed an extraordinary genius for the arts, which he disgraced by the depravity and intemperance of his conduct. Like most artists of that character, his works were the productions of negligence and haste. He painted, in concurrence with Bartolommeo Schedone, some pictures representing scenes in the Life of Hercules, in the Council-hall at Modena. He is said to have followed the style of his great-uncle, Niccolò dell'Abbate (died 1571).

In 1604 - 1608, he contributed to the decoration of the Sala del Consiglio of Modena. He painted a St Francis of Assisi shown clear water ampule by an Angel for a room in the Palazzo Comunale, and an Annunciation for the church of the Madonna del Paradiso in Modena. He painted a Holy Martyrs Faustino and Giovita for the church of the same name. He also painted an Annunciation for the church of San Pietro, Modena.

He died at Modena. The Galleria Estense has three works by this artist— an 'Annunciation,' a 'Presentation in the Temple,' and a 'Birth of St. John the Baptist.' A 'Marriage of the Virgin,' in the same gallery, is by some attributed to Ercole dell' Abbate, and by others to his son, Pietro Paolo, the younger.

== Bibliography ==
- Valdrighi, Conte Mario (1826). Della Vita e Delle Opere di Ercole Abati Pittore Modenese Cenni [An Outline of the Life and Works of Modenese Painter Ercole Abati] (in Italian). Modena, Italy: G. Vincenzi E. Compagno.
