= San Francesco, Modena =

Church building in Modena, Italy

Coordinates: 44.643496°N 10.922100°E

San Francesco is a Gothic-style, Roman Catholic church in central Modena, Italy.

== History ==
Franciscan friars were present in Modena early, by 1221, when Francis was still alive. But as was their custom, their first monastery and church were located outside of town, in an area prone to flooding. It was decided to move to this site in 1244, and construction began of a monastery and a church dedicated to the recently canonized Francis of Assisi. In 1501, the bell-tower was damaged by an earthquake.

Reconstruction occurred in the church starting in 1535, causing the destruction of the lateral chapels and movement of the choir into the apse behind the altar, and covering much of the previous painted decoration. It was used by the Frati Minori, but they were expelled in 1774 by the Ducal authorities, who reduced the city to five parishes. By the late 18th-century had been devolved into use as stables and housing for animals.

It was reconsecrated to cult in 1829, with refurbishment and restoration in a Gothic style by Gusmano Soli. A second neo-gothic refurbishment was pursued between 1886 and 1888 by Carlo Barbieri. The exterior brick facade has a large rose window. The 16th-century bell tower has an octagonal base.

== Interior ==
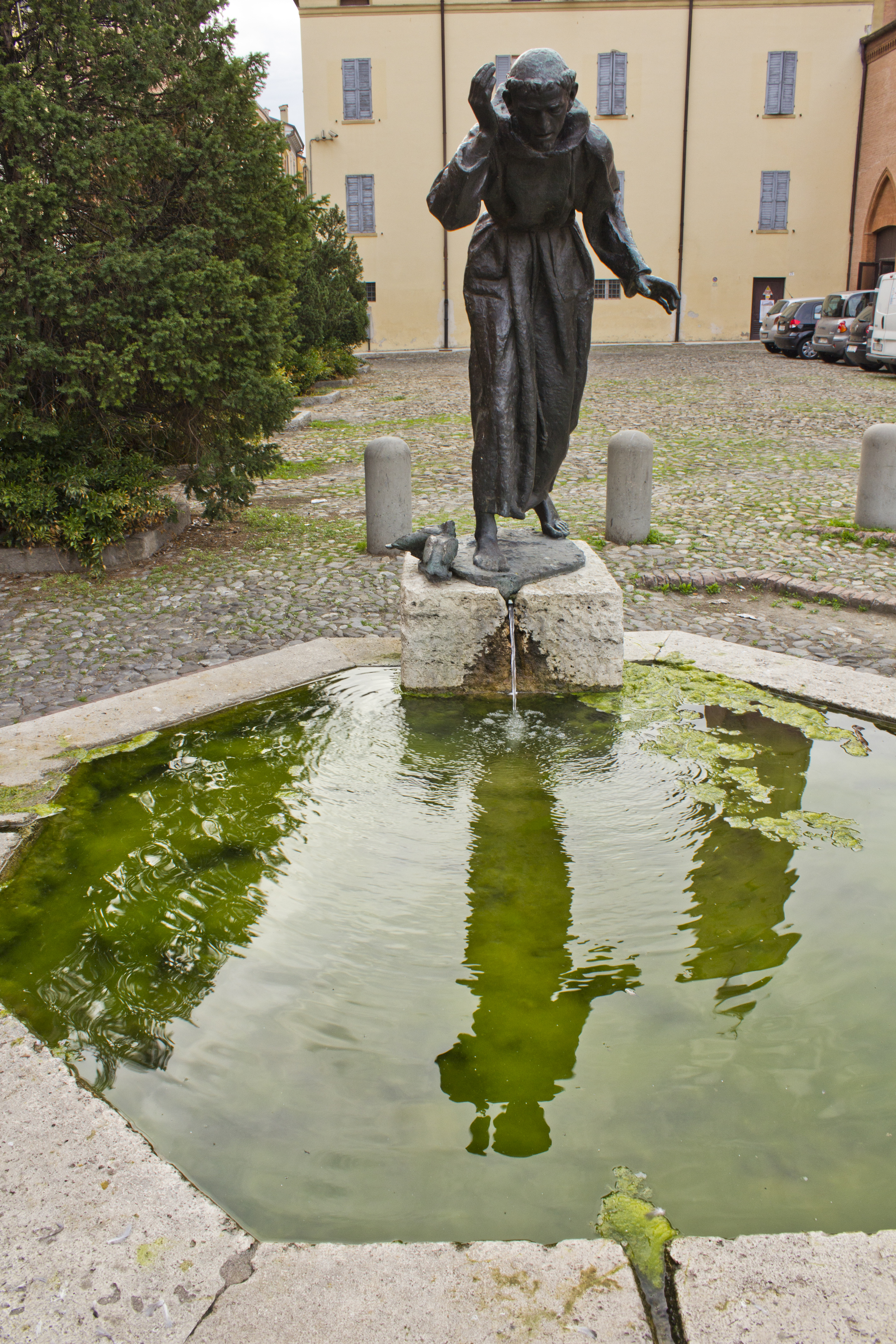
Fontana di San Francesco

The interior was noted to have an 1840 monument celebrating the ebbing of the cholera epidemic in Modena, sculpted by Luigi Mainoni. In the left apse there is a large terracotta statuary group of thirteen statues depicting a Deposition from the Cross by Antonio Begarelli from 1531. It is considered to be Begarelli's masterpiece.

In the choir of the nave, is a canvas depicting Saint Francis receiving the stigmata by Adeodato Malatesta. The original organ was built by Giovanni Cipri of Ferrara, but replaced by an organ, now in the counter facade made by the Benedetti of Desenzano. The organ is from the end of the 19th century.

In the little square near the church, the fountain represents the Saint sculpted by Giuseppe Graziosi.
