= Boiardi =

Boiardi (pronounced: Boy-AR-dee) is an Italian surname.

Notable uses of this surname include:

== People ==
- Amedeo Boiardi, Italian politician, early-1990s president of the Province of Massa and Carrara
- Anna Boiardi, grandniece of Ettore Boiardi, star of reality show Playing with Fire (2013 TV series)
- Carlo Boiardi, mid-20th-century Roman Catholic Bishop of Apuania, see Roman Catholic Diocese of Massa Carrara-Pontremoli
- Ettore Boiardi (1897–1985; anglicized as Hector Boyardee), Italian chef and Italian-American food entrepreneur
  - Chef Boyardee, an Italian food brand created by Ettore Boiardi, now a ConAgra Foods brand
- Mario Joseph Boiardi, only child of Ettore Boiardi, businessman entrepreneur and inventor, married to Maureen Elizabeth Boiardi, second wife and daughter-in-law of Ettore Boiardi
- Helen Jayne Hobbs-Boiardi, academic school teacher.
- Richard Hobbs-Boiardi, race car designer.
- George Boiardi, a midfielder lacrosse player, see List of Premier Lacrosse League awards
- Gian Luigi Boiardi (1951–2018), Italian politician

== Other uses ==
- Geoffrey Boiardi, a fictional character from the 2001 romcom film The Next Big Thing (film)
- George Boiardi Short Stick Midfielder of the Year, see List of Premier Lacrosse League awards

== See also ==
- Boiardo (surname), an Italian surname
- Bojardi (surname), an Italian surname
