= Antonio Begarelli =

Italian sculptor

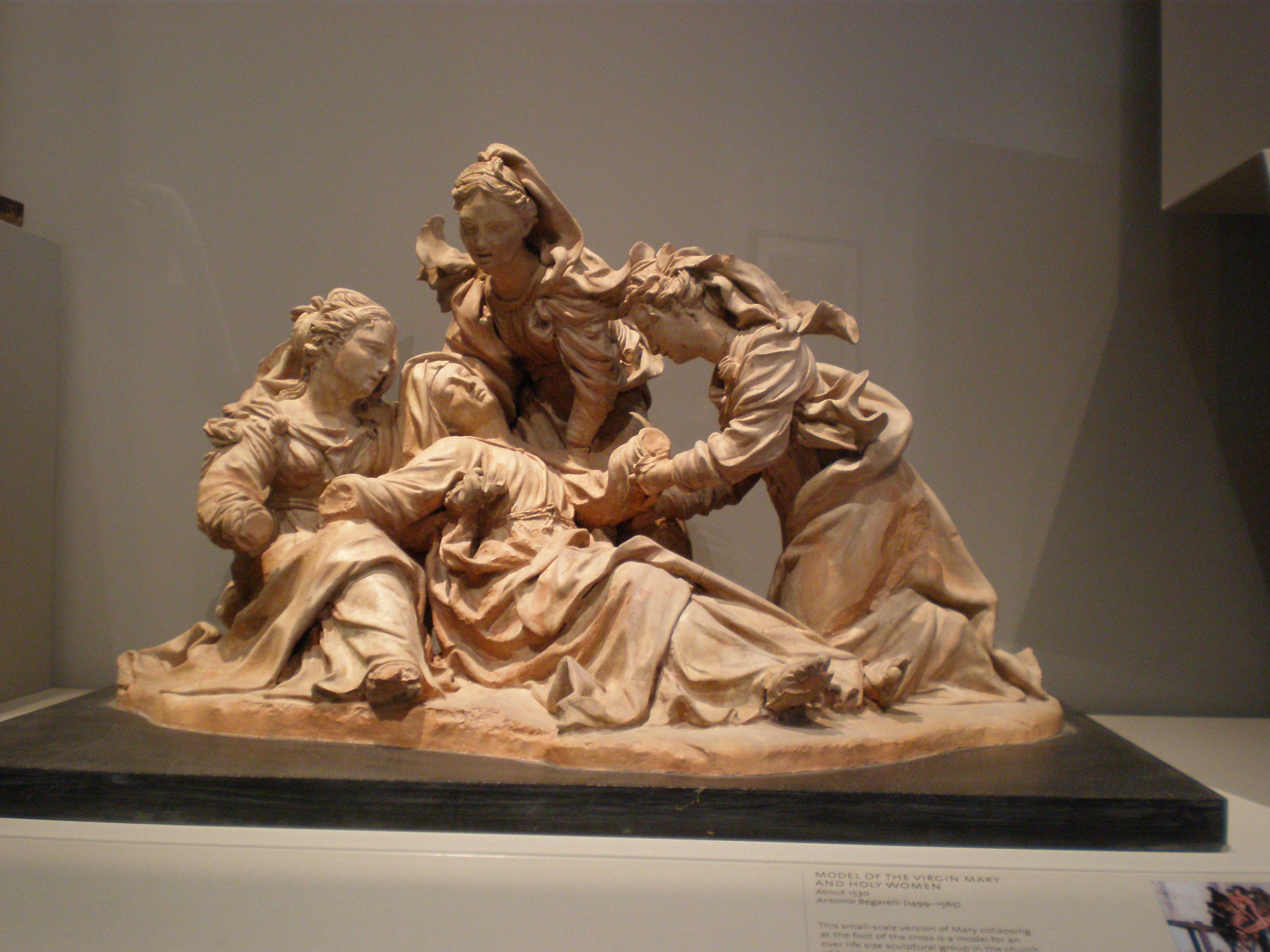
Model of the Virgin Mary and Holy Women, ca. 1530, now at the Victoria and Albert Museum

Antonio Begarelli, also known as Begarino (1499–1565) was an Italian sculptor. In the 16th century, he was the dominant force in terracotta production in Modena.

== Life ==
He was born at Modena. Antonio is said to have been instructed by Giovanni dell'Abbate, the father of the painter Niccolò. His first known work was the Madonna di Piazza, today in the Civic Museum in Modena. His first works soon earned him numerous commissions from churches and communities in Modena.

Begarelli worked chiefly in Modena, where many churches are decorated with his sculptures in terra-cotta; and in his later years also at Parma. These are free standing figures, nearly life-size, grouped together above altars in the chapels and apparently intended to replace pictures. This peculiar adaptation of sculpture was first used in Modena by Guido Mazzoni, called II Modanino, a highly gifted realist artist. Whilst Mazzoni's terra-cotta figures are painted in variegated colours, Begarelli painted them entirely in white, sometimes outlining the edges of clothes and decorative details in gold.

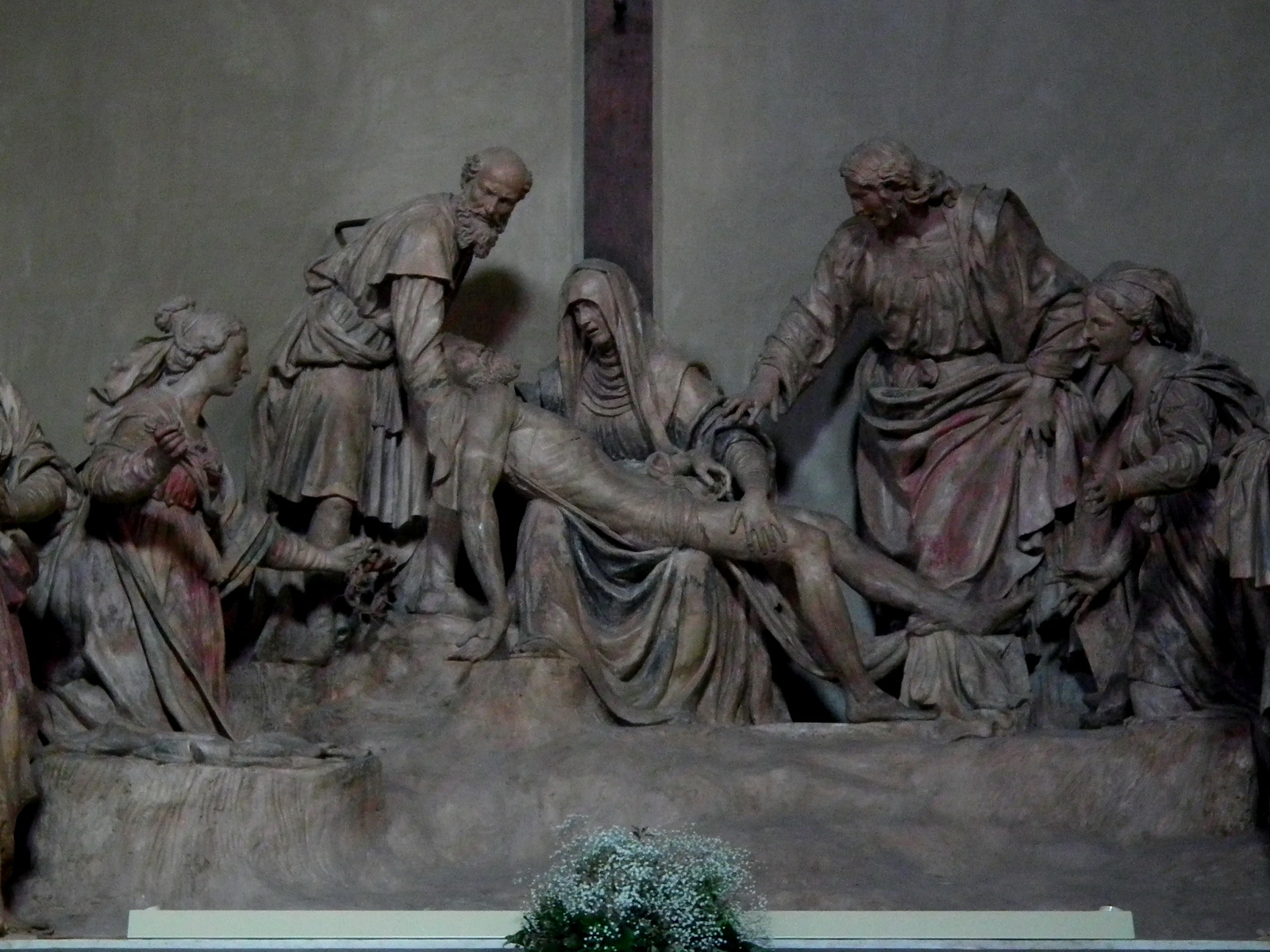
Lamentation, Sant'Agostino

Among his works is a Lamentation Over the Dead Christ now in the Church of Sant'Agostino. The Duomo contains a Nativity completed in 1527. A "Madonna Lactans" is in the Galleria Estense along with a number of other works. There are six terracotta statues (San Francesco, Madonna, San Pietro, San Bonaventura, Santa Giustina and San Benedetto) by Begarelli in the Church of San Pietro originally created for the dormitory of the nearby monastery. In the left apse of the Church of San Francesco there is a large terracotta statuary group of thirteen statues depicting a Deposition from the Cross from 1531, which is considered to be Begarelli's masterpiece.

In 1536 he was doing work for Alfonso I d'Este, Duke of Ferrara. Around 1543 Begarelli provided terracotta statues of St. John the Evangelist and Madonna with Child and St. John, (now in the church of San Giovanni Evangelista) for the Benedictines of Parma. In 1559 he provided thirty-one figures for the church at the Abbey of San Benedetto in Polirone.

Scholars hold widely varying opinions regarding a tradition that asserts that Begarelli was associated and corroborated with Correggio. It has been supposed (by Vidriani, 1652), that Begarelli made the models from which Correggio painted many of his figures, and even instructed his friend in the art of modelling

Begarelli's figures have a closer resemblance to those of the Ferrarese painter Benvenuto Tisi than to those of Correggio. They have the same types as the former used, and his draperies are similarly arranged.

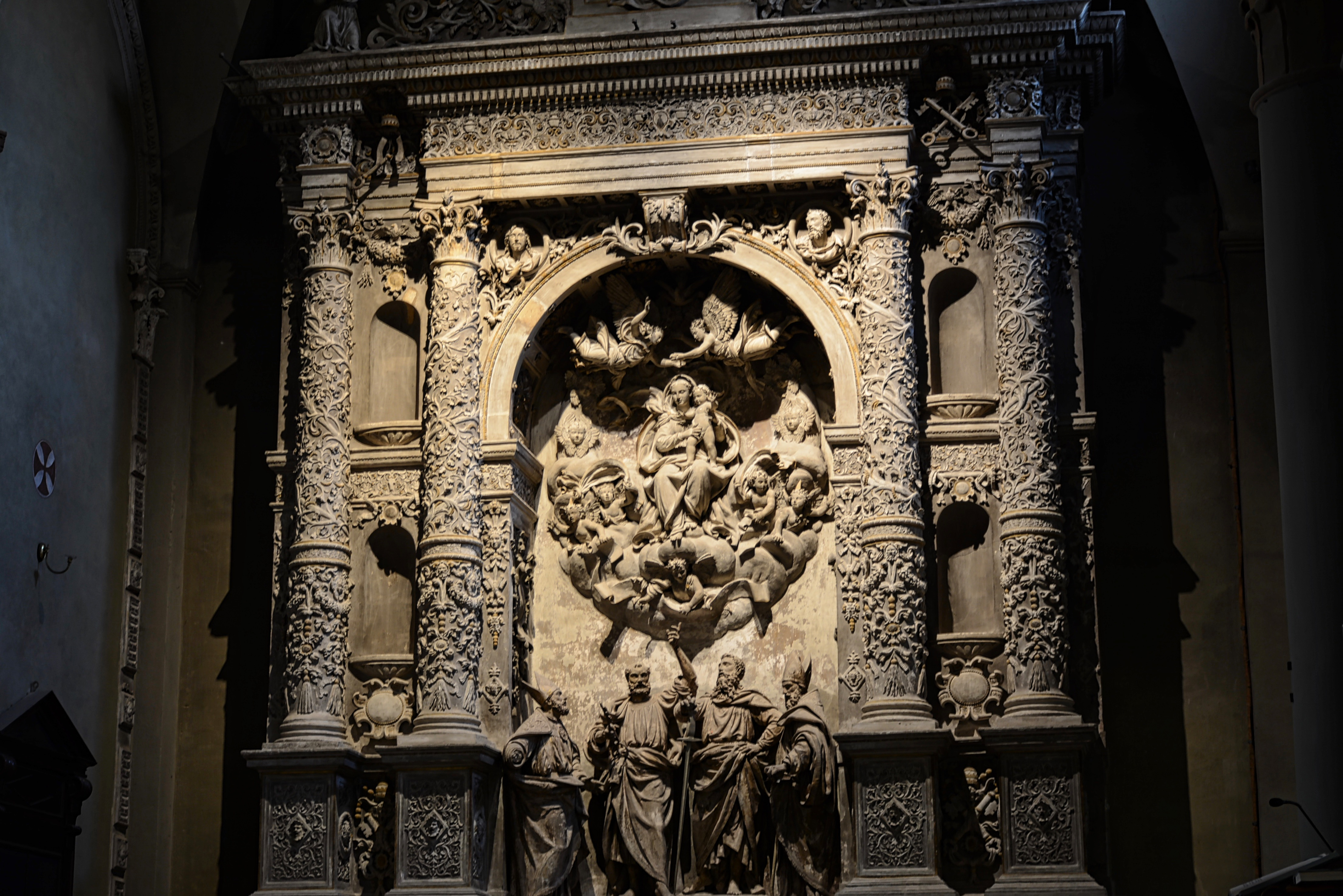
Begarelli's tomb, Basilica San Pietro

Late Renaissance art biographer Giorgio Vasari relates that "Michelangelo, when passing through Modena, saw many beautiful figures which the Modenese sculptor, Maestro Antonio Begarino, had made of terra-cotta, coloured to look like marble, which appeared to him to be most excellent productions; and, as that sculptor did not know how to work in marble, he said, 'If this earth were to become marble, woe to the antiques.". His pupils included Prospero Spani, Alberto Fontana, and Niccolò dell'Abbate.

Before his death in 1565, Begarelli had been commissioned to construct an altar for the Benedictine Church of San Pietro. The work, completed by his nephew Lodovico, became his funerary mausoleum.

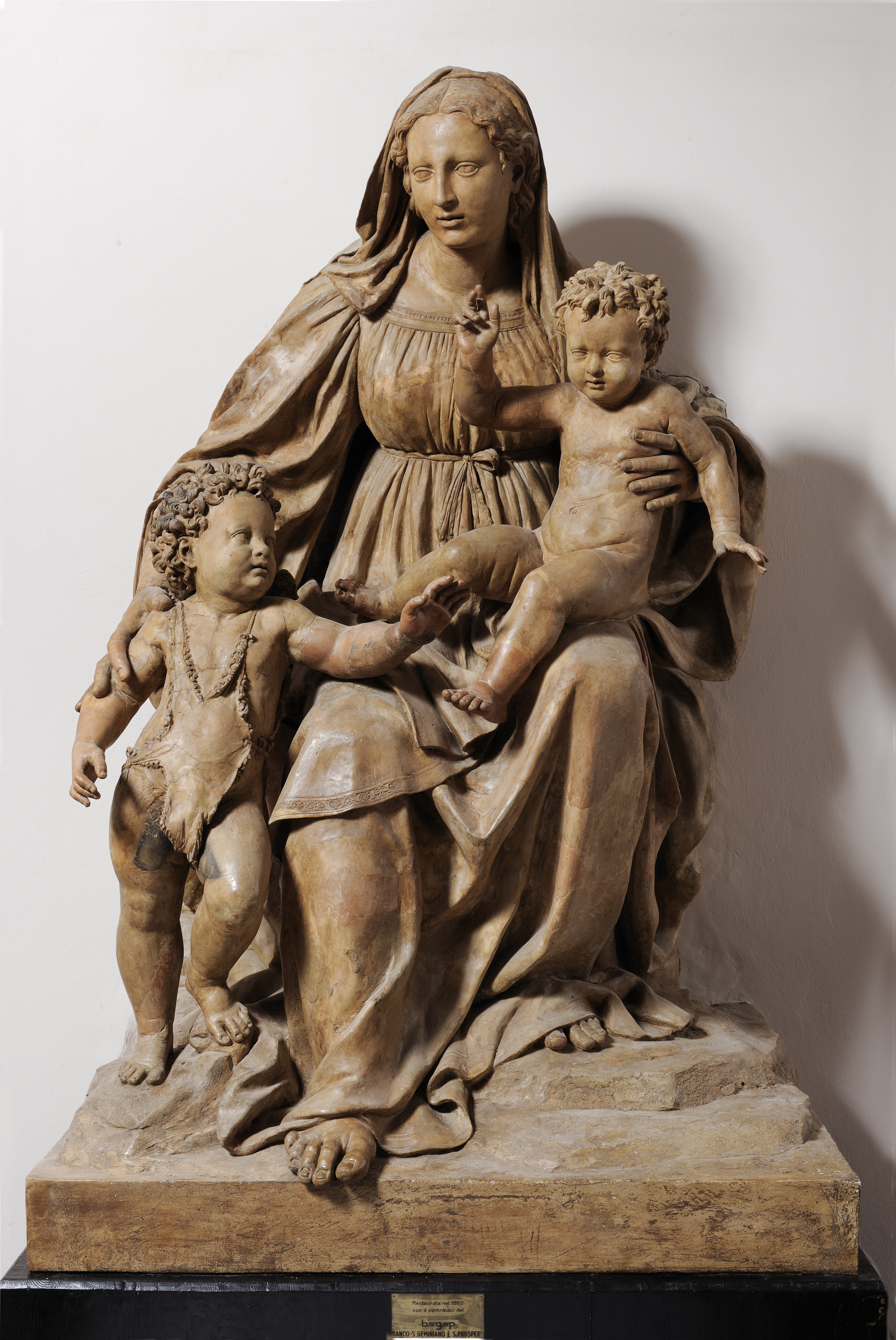
Madonna di Piazza, 1522, Museo Civico di Modena

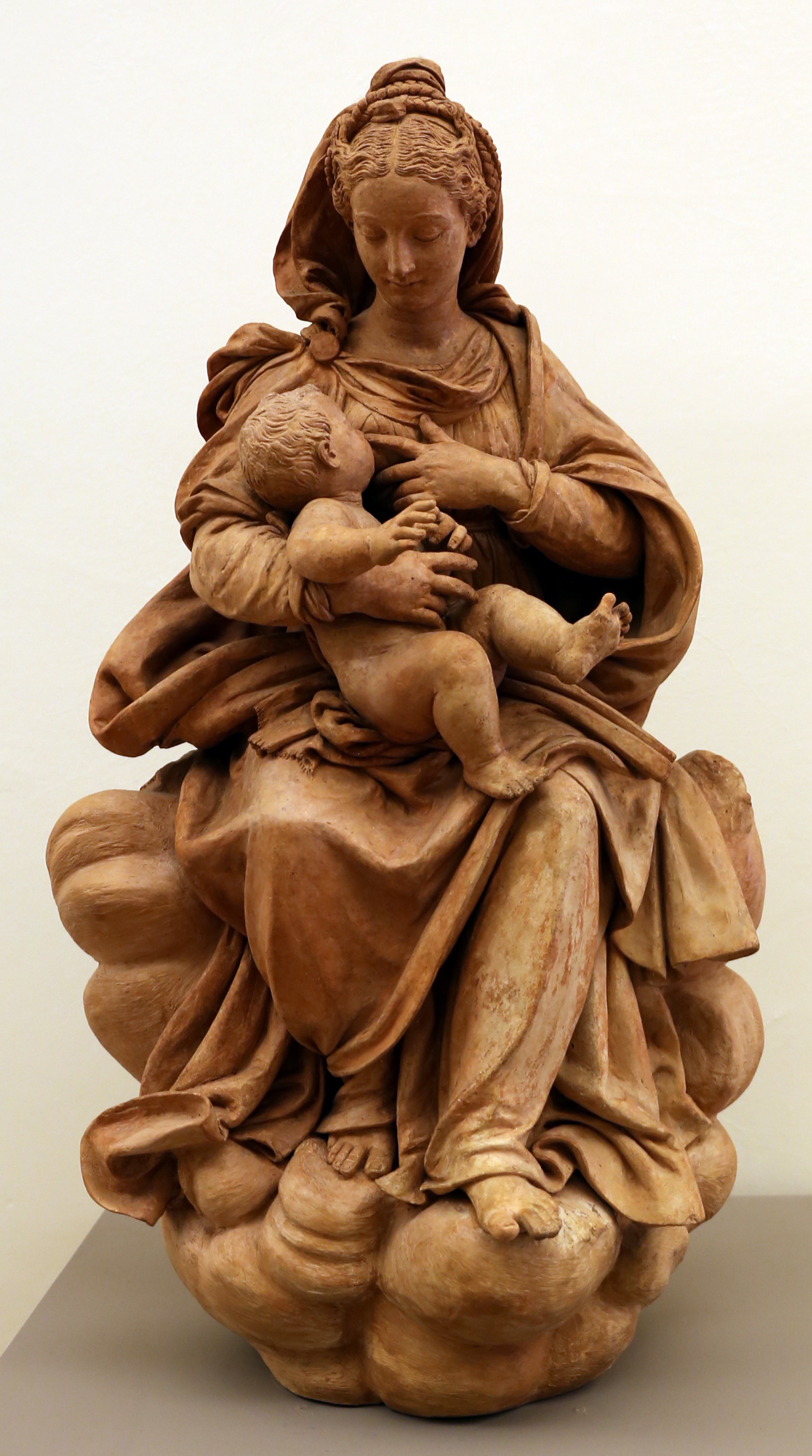
Madona del latte, 1532-35 ca.

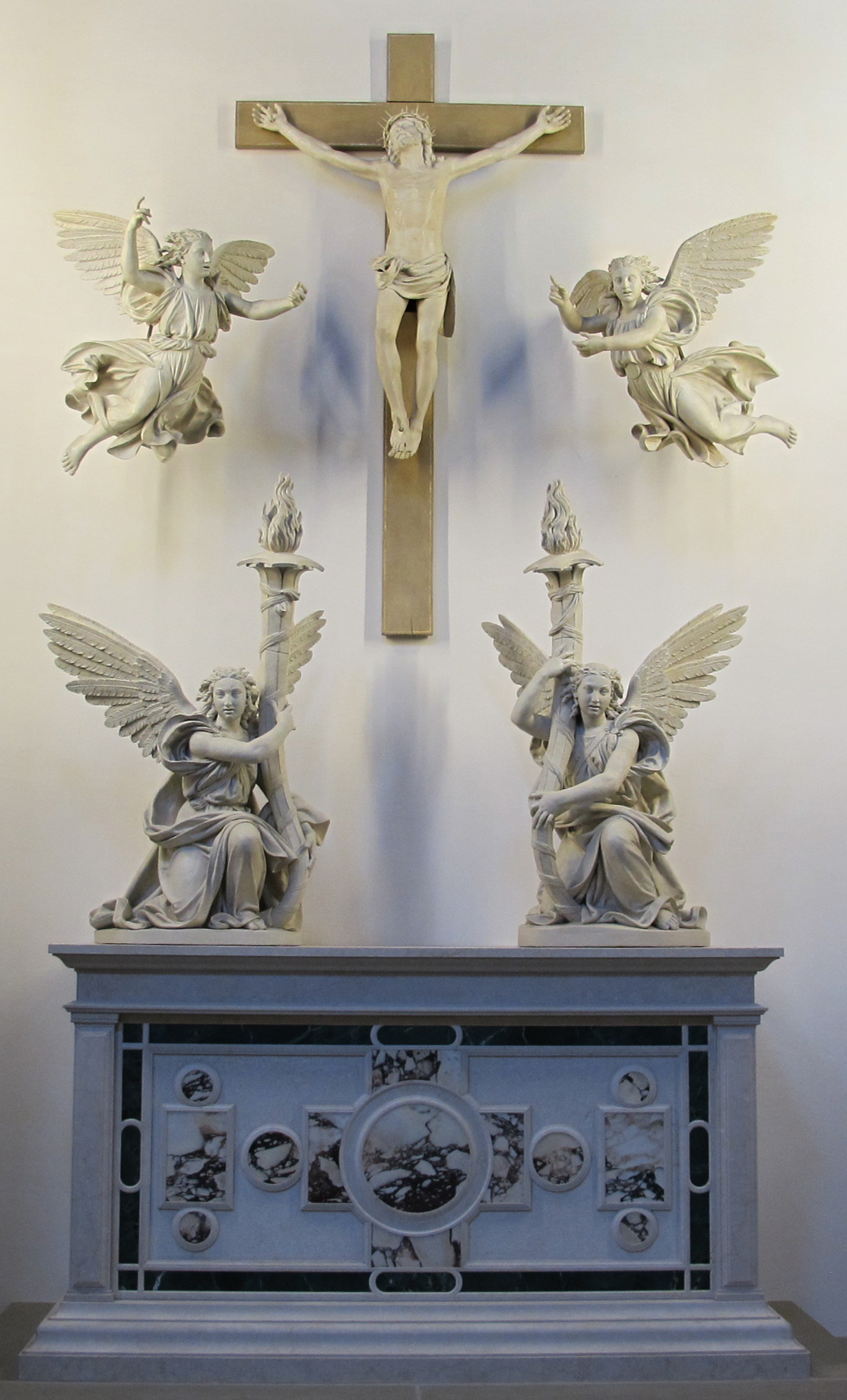
Crocifissione con Quattro Angeli (1534 ca), Bode Museum

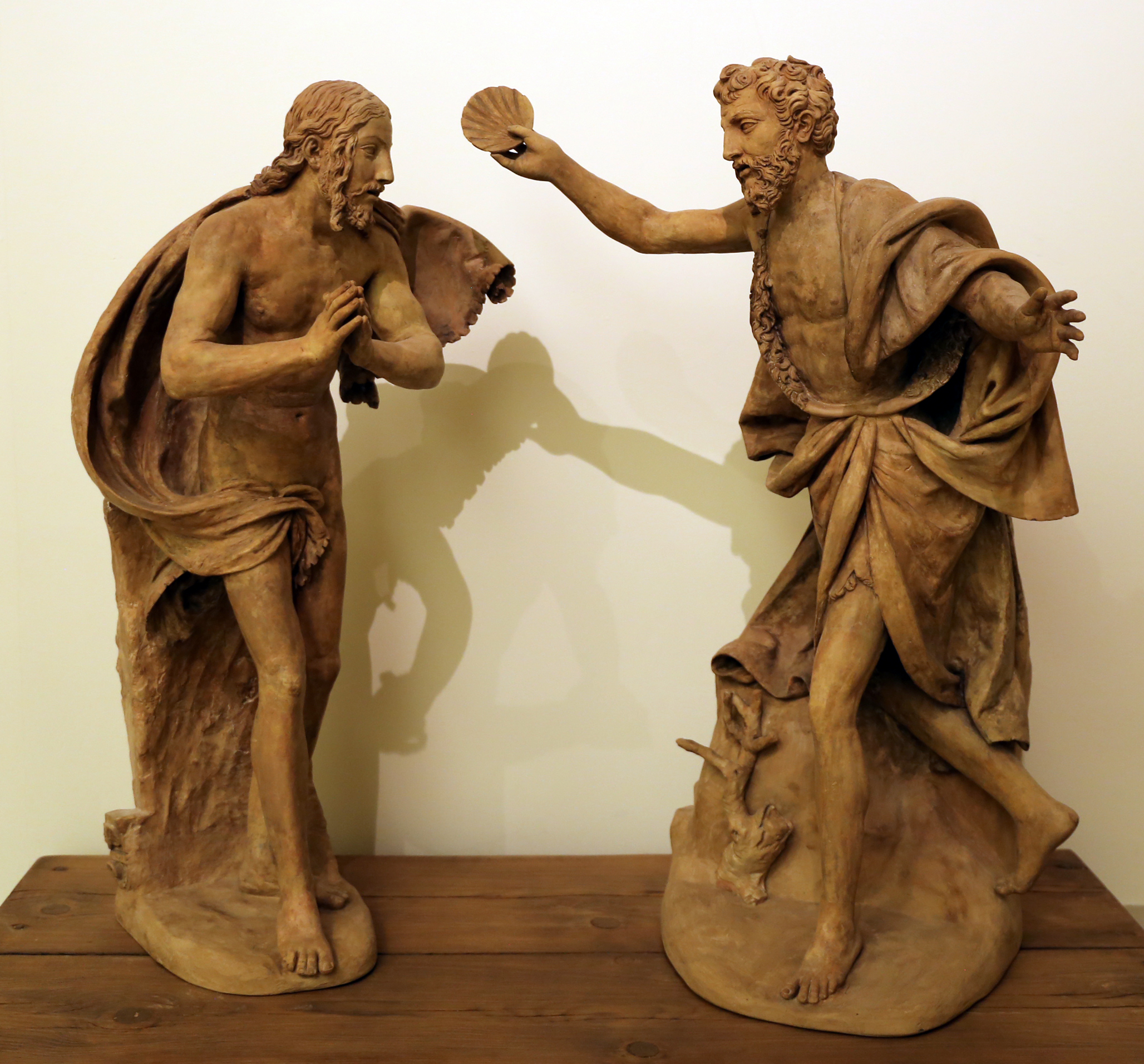
Baptism of Christ, post 1534, Galleria estense
