= Sant'Agostino, Modena =

Roman Catholic parish church in Modena, Italy

Coordinates: 44°38′52″N 10°55′18″E

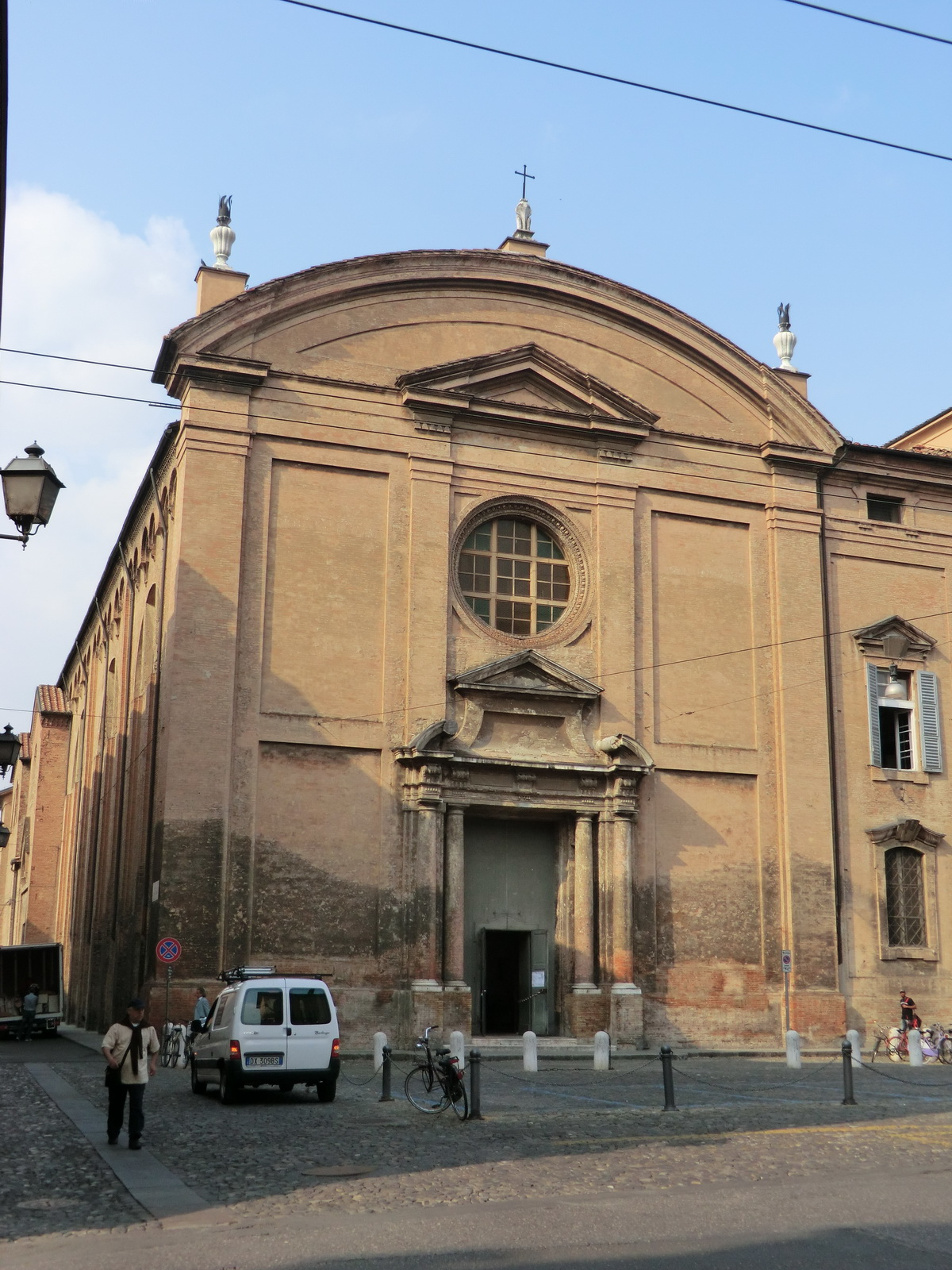
Chiesa Parrocchiale di Sant'Agostino

Chiesa Parrocchiale di Sant'Agostino is a Roman Catholic parish church on Piazza Sant'Agostino in central Modena, Italy.

== History and description ==
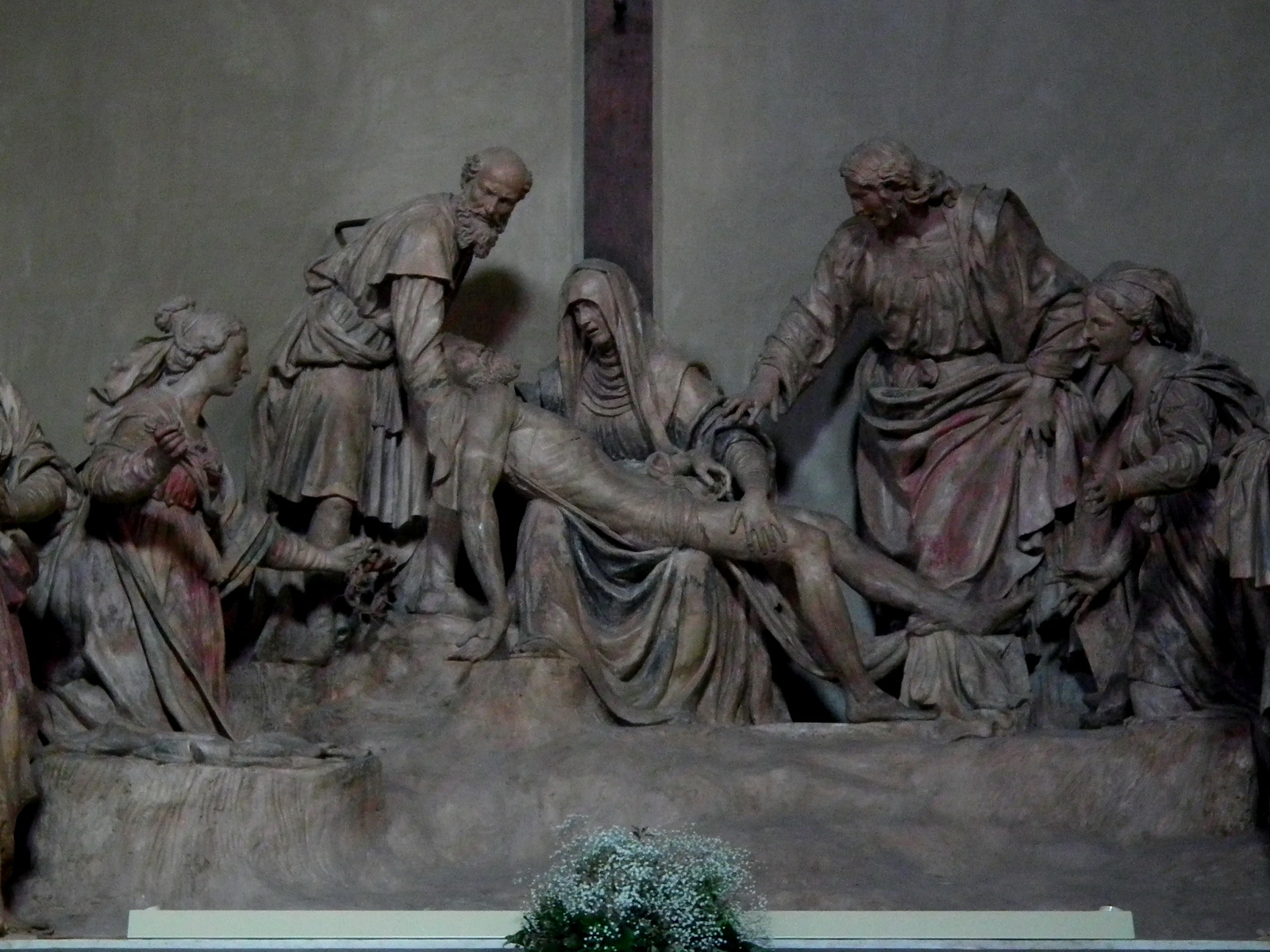
Lamentation over Dead Christ, terracotta altar sculptures, by Begarelli

Founded in the 14th century by the Order of Augustinian Hermits, the church was rapidly refurbished between 1662 and 1663 by the Duchess Regent Laura Martinozzi for the funeral of her husband, Alfonso IV. The new church was designed by the architect Gian Giacomo Monti and became the Este Pantheon for the celebration of Este family funerals. The rich series of decorations was designed by the Jesuit Domenico Gamberti who in 1659 had also overseen the funeral of Francesco I Este, the first duke to be commemorated in the Church.

During Duke Francesco's funeral, as was customary at the time, the church was completely transformed by a series of sumptuous temporary decorations. In the case of Alfonso IV these became permanent, a unique event in the history of European funerary art. The rich plasterwork and paintings depict an impressive series of monarchs, empresses, kings and queens, saints and holy men, bishops and popes linked to the House of Este. The most important artists at court were commissioned, including Olivier Dauphin, Sigismondo Caula, Francesco Stringa, Lattanzio Maschio and Giovanni Lazzoni. Reopened to the public in 2018 after the 2012 earthquake, the church houses numerous masterpieces including the 16th-century terracotta Lamentation by Antonio Begarelli and a fragment of a 14th-century fresco of a Madonna and Child attributed to Tomaso da Modena.

The rather simple brick facade does not reflect the elaborately decorated interior. The basilica layout has a wide nave with protruding side altars. The ceiling holds framed canvases and is heavily encrusted with stucco sculpture.
