= Reggio Emilia Cathedral =

Roman Catholic cathedral in Reggio Emilia, Italy

Coordinates: 44°41′51″N 10°37′51″E

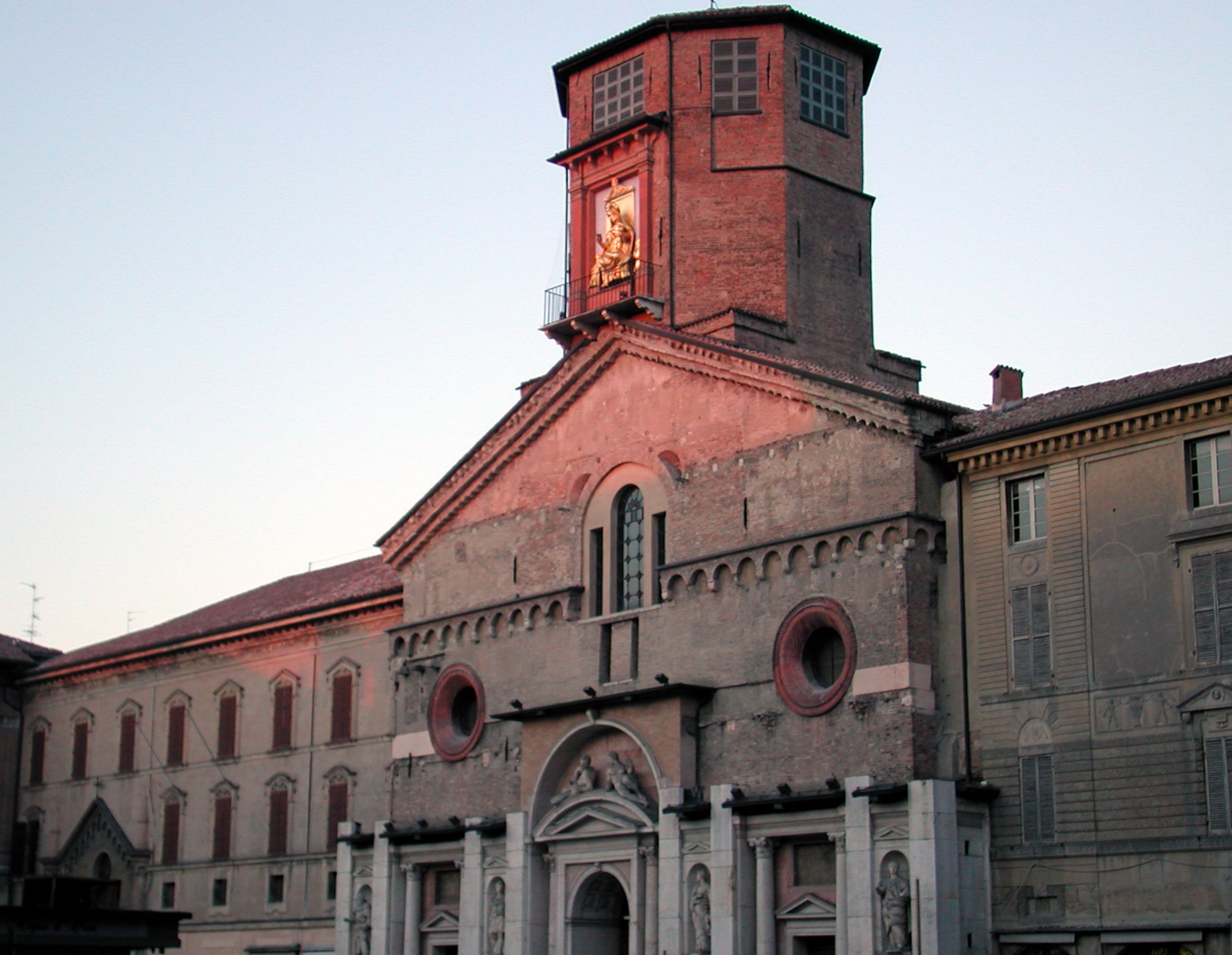
- West front of the cathedral

Religion
- Affiliation: Roman Catholic
- Rite: Latin Rite (Roman)

Location
- Location: Reggio Emilia, Italy
- Interactive map of Reggio Emilia Cathedral

Architecture
- Style: first Romanesque, then Renaissance and Baroque

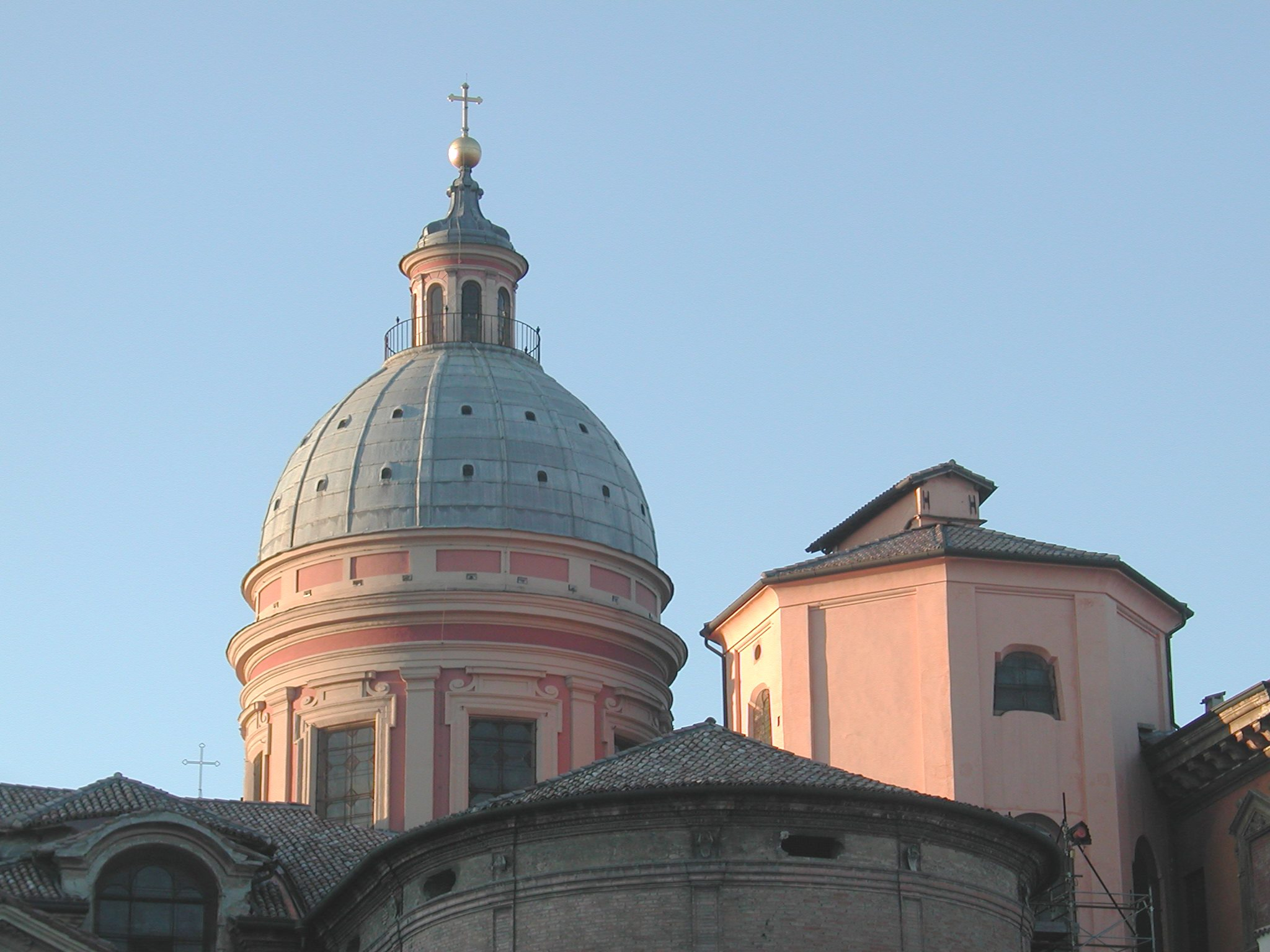
Dome

Reggio Emilia Cathedral (Italian: Duomo di Reggio Emilia; Cattedrale di Santa Maria Assunta) is a Roman Catholic cathedral (and one of the three main religious buildings) in Reggio Emilia (Emilia-Romagna, northern Italy). The dedication is to the Assumption of the Virgin Mary. Formerly the episcopal seat of the Diocese of Reggio Emilia, it has been since 1986 that of the Diocese of Reggio Emilia-Guastalla.

== Description ==
Built originally in Romanesque style, the cathedral was largely modified in the following centuries. The façade originally had 13th-century frescoes, now housed in the diocesan museum.

The current façade is unfinished, with a 16th-century covering on the lower level, with pilasters surrounding niches containing the statues of the four patron saints of the city. The main portal has two statues by Prospero Spani (Prospero Sogari) in a style influenced by Michelangelo, portraying Adam and Eve.

In February 2009 it was announced that a Roman mosaic floor filled with scenes depicting pagan rites and oriental gods had been discovered underneath the cathedral. The mosaic pavement, which measures 13 square meters and dates to the 4th century AD, was unearthed at a depth of about 4 meters below the ground during archaeological investigations in the crypt. The size and design of the mosaic pavement suggest that it formed the floor of a huge room. The mosaic pavement has become an important piece of the Museo Diocesano (Museum of the Diocese), which exposes also fragments of ancient churches, dating back to the times of Matilde di Canossa, and a medieval bas-relief (Christ in throne amidst angels), originally located in the main altar of the cathedral.

== The chapels ==
- The Brami Chapel has an altarpiece by Jacopo Palma il Giovane
- The Toschi Chapel was designed by Girolamo Rainaldi and decorated by Giuseppe Cesari, known as Il Cavalier d'Arpino, and by Cristoforo Roncalli, known as Il Pomarancio
- The Rangone Chapel has a funeral monument to Bishop Ugo Rangone carved by Prospero Spani (Il Clemente).
- The main altarpiece is an Assumption by Federico Zuccari
- The Chapel of the Holy Sacrament has traces of frescoes from the 1500s by a pupil of Correggio, Giovanni Giarola.
- The Fiordibelli Chapel has paintings by Giovan Francesco Barbieri known as Guercino

There are also works by Carlo Bononi, Francesco Vellani, Sebastiano Vercellesi, and Orazio Talami, whilst Annibale Carracci's The Virgin Appears to Saint Luke and Saint Catherine originally hung in the cathedral's notaries' chapel. The cupola frescoes are by Francesco Fontanesi (1779).
