= The Virgin Appears to Saint Luke and Saint Catherine (Annibale Carracci) =

Painting by Annibale Carracci

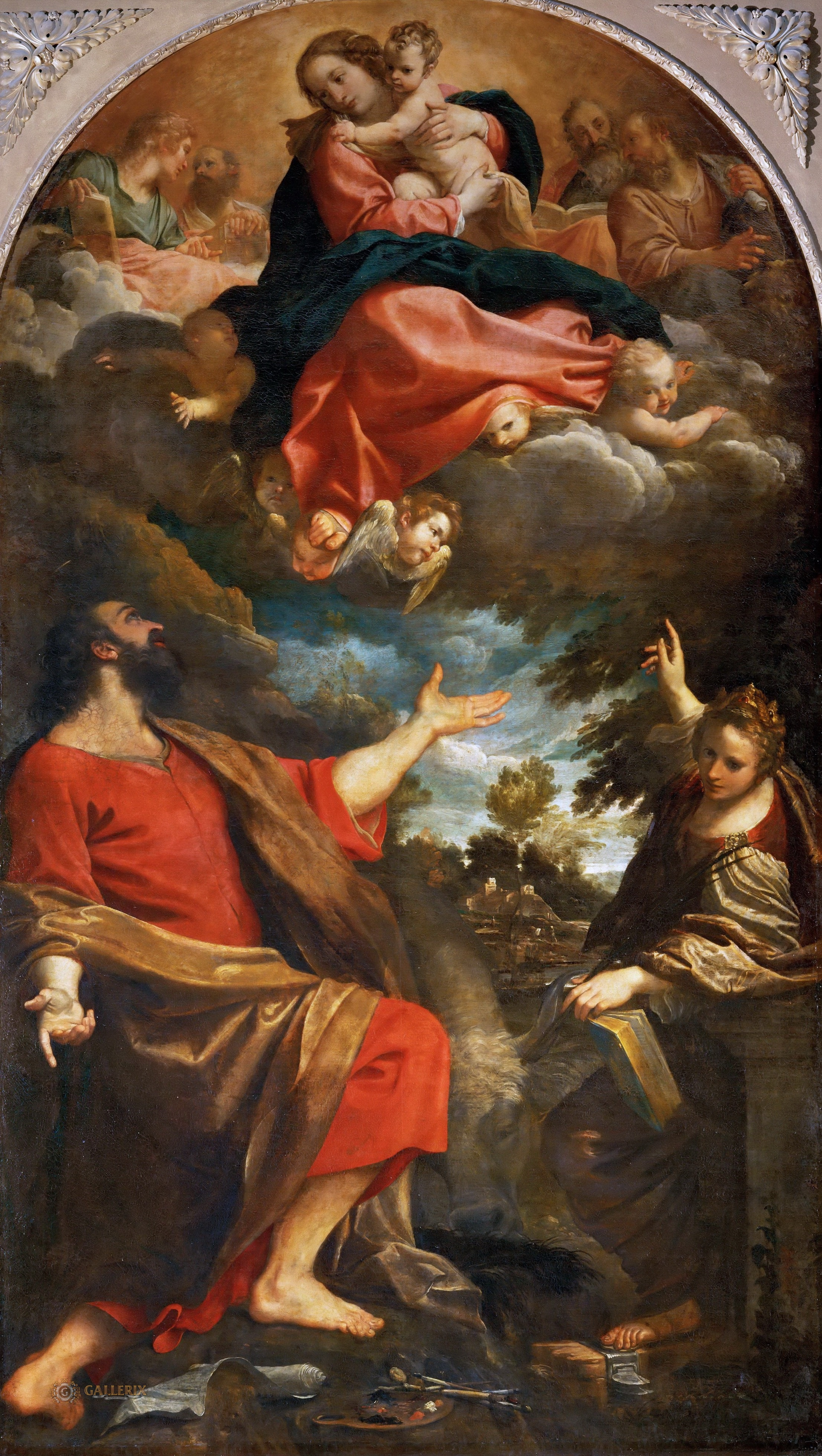
The Virgin Appears to Saint Luke and Saint Catherine (1592) by Annibale Carracci

The Virgin Appears to the Saint Luke and Saint Catherine is an oil on canvas painting by Annibale Carracci, now in the Louvre in Paris. It was commissioned in 1589 for the notaries' chapel in Reggio Emilia Cathedral and completed three years later It is also known as The Virgin of Saint Luke, The Saint Luke Madonna and Child and Apparition of the Virgin to Saint Luke and Saint Catherine. Luke was chosen as the patron saint of both painters and notaries, appearing twice, at bottom left and top right. The work was looted from Italy by Napoleon's troops in 1798, placed in the Louvre and not returned to Italy after the end of the Napoleonic Wars.
