= Prospero Spani =

Italian sculptor

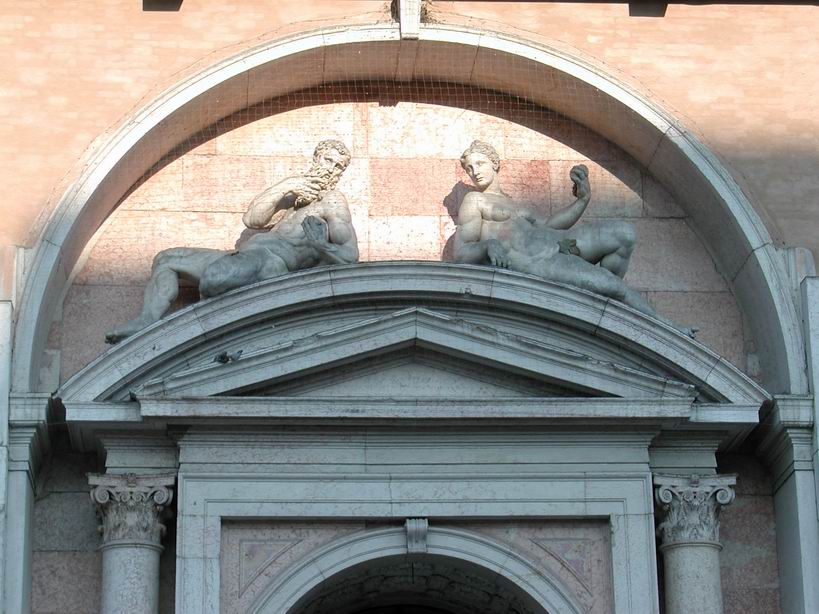
Adam and Eve on Entrance portal of Cathedral of Reggio Emilia

Prospero Spani (16 February 1516 – 25 May 1584) was an Italian sculptor of the Renaissance, active mainly in the Province of Reggio Emilia. He is variously known as Prospero Clementi or Prospero Clemente or il Clemente. Vasari claimed he was Modenese.

== Biography ==
Spani was born and died in Reggio Emilia. He initially trained with his grandfather, Bartolommeo Clementi, and then apprenticed with Antonio Begarelli. He soon modeled much of his work after the mannerist style of Michelangelo.

The Funeral Monument for the blessed Bernardo degli Uberti (1544) in the Cathedral of Parma is his first work. He also completed some works for the Prati family in Parma. In the church of San Andrea in Mantua, he sculpted a monument for the Bishop Andreossi (Andreasi) (1549), with a sphinx and bronze swan, flanked by sculptures of Faith and Charity . He also worked for the Cathedral of Carpi and the church of San Domenico in Bologna.

He was prolific in his native Reggio Emilia, where he left in a bronze tabernacle; and a monument of Bishop Rangone (Rangoni) in 1567, for which, after five years, he was handsomely paid 1250 gold scudi. He complete a monument for Bishop Filippo Zoboli (1554) in San Nicolò of Reggio Emilia, which is flanked by grieving maidens. Algarotti extolled him as the "Correggio of sculpture". William Waters, less kindly, called his works "some of the worst sculpture of the time..monstrous..and absurdity". For the Cathedral of Reggio Emilia, he completed a Christ with the Cross and statues of St Grisanto and St Daria outside west door, while over the main portal, he had statues of a recumbent Adam and Eve (1552–1557). He also completed statues of Lepidus and Hercules at Modena, the statue of St Procolo for the Volta tomb at Bologna, and a recumbent Figure of Alberto Pio del Carpi in the Louvre.

== Notes and sources ==
- Boni, Filippo de' (1852). Biografia degli artisti ovvero dizionario della vita e delle opere dei pittori, degli scultori, degli intagliatori, dei tipografi e dei musici di ogni nazione che fiorirono da'tempi più remoti sino á nostri giorni. Seconda Edizione.. Venice; Googlebooks: Presso Andrea Santini e Figlio. p. 228.
- Lives of the most eminent painters, sculptors, and architects, Volume 4 (1883) By Giorgio Vasari, translated by Jonathan Foster. Publishers George Bell and Sons, London. Page 518 .
- Italian Sculptors. William George Waters. (1926) Methuem, Publisher. pages 212–213.
