= Bojardi =

Bojardi is an Italian surname.

People with this surname include:

- Carlo Bojardi, 15th-century bishop of the Roman Catholic Archdiocese of Modena-Nonantola
- Gherardo Bojardi (15th century) . a Councilor of Marquis Niccolò of Ferrara, see Roman Catholic Archdiocese of Ferrara-Comacchio
- Nicolò Bojardi, 15th-century bishop of the Roman Catholic Archdiocese of Modena-Nonantola
- Ottorino Bojardi, soccer player for A.C. Reggiana 1919
- Pietro Bojardi, 15th-century bishop of the Roman Catholic Archdiocese of Modena-Nonantola and archbishop of the Roman Catholic Archdiocese of Ferrara-Comacchio

== See also ==
- Boiardi (surname), an Italian surname
- Boiardo (surname), an Italian surname
