= Gian Gheramo Dalle Catene =

Italian painter

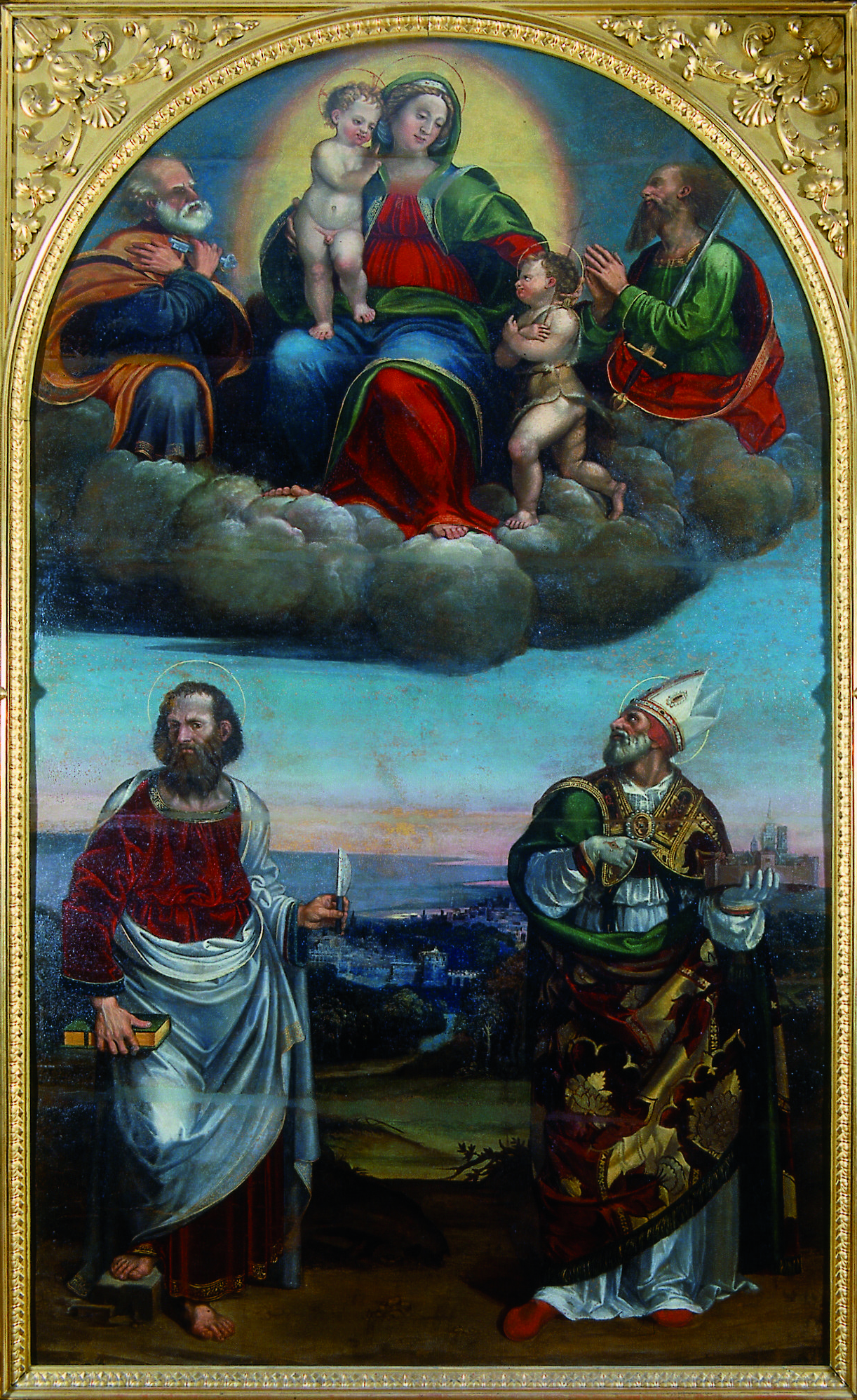
La Madonna col Bambino, i santi Giovannino, Pietro e Paolo tra le nuvole e, in basso, Bartolomeo e Geminiano, Museo Civico di Modena

Gian Gheramo or Giovanni Gherardo Dalle Catene or Zangirardo Cathena (Parma, active 1520–1533) was an Italian painter of the Renaissance, active in Modena in a style reminiscent of Giovanni Bellini.

== Biography ==
He is known to have traveled to Rome and likely Tuscany. Of the few works and documentation, are two lawsuits. One is by a Jewish merchant in the city. The other is a suit by the Benedictine Monastery of San Pietro which demanded in payment an altarpiece with three figures including the Madonna, St Luke, and John the Evangelist, which had to be adjudicated to value 200 lire. This altarpiece was said to be in the sixth chapel on the right of the Abbey church.
