= San Pietro, Modena =

Building complex in central Modena, Italy

The Monastery and Church of San Pietro (St Peter) is a building complex located on Via San Pietro in central Modena, Italy. The site still hosts an active Benedictine monastery, and the building now serves as a parish church.

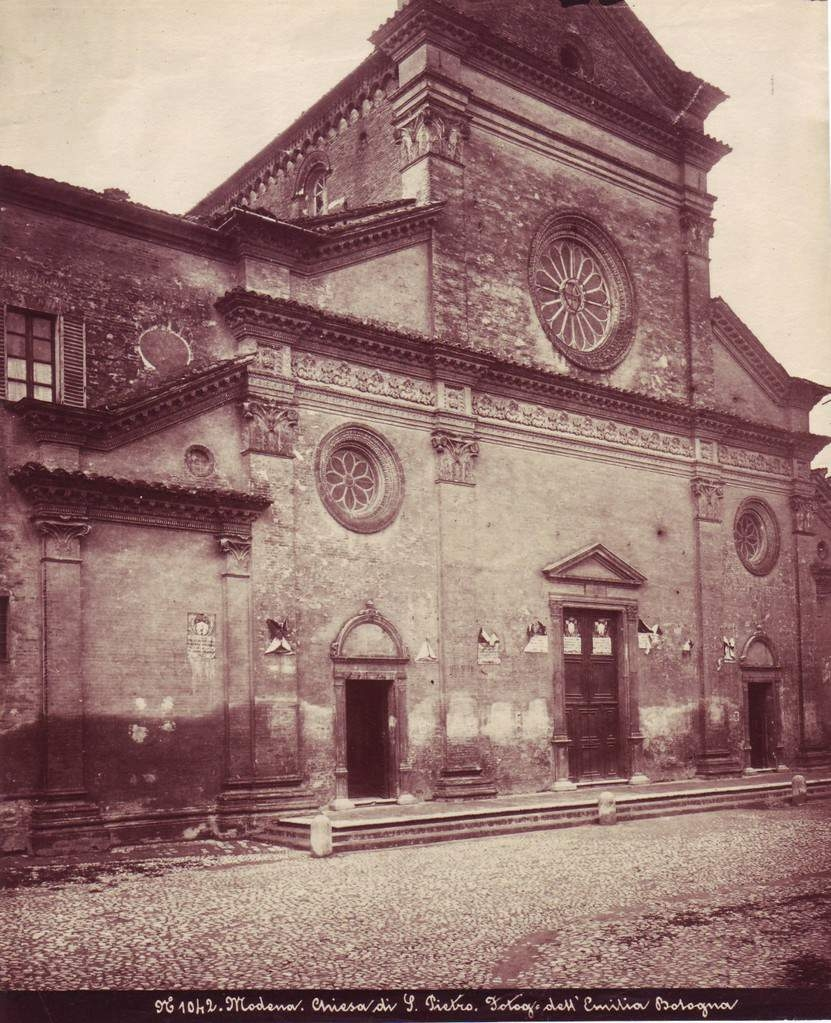
Facade of Church of San Pietro

== History ==
The Benedictine Abbey was founded in the year 983 by Bishop Hildebrandus. As early as the tenth century the monastery was equipped with an apothecaur to serve the abbey infirmary.

In 1434 the monastery was aggregated to the Congregation of Santa Giustina, which later became the Cassinese Congregation. The church was rebuilt during 1476 to 1518. The work has been attributed to Pietro Barabani of Carpi. The church was consecrated in 1518.

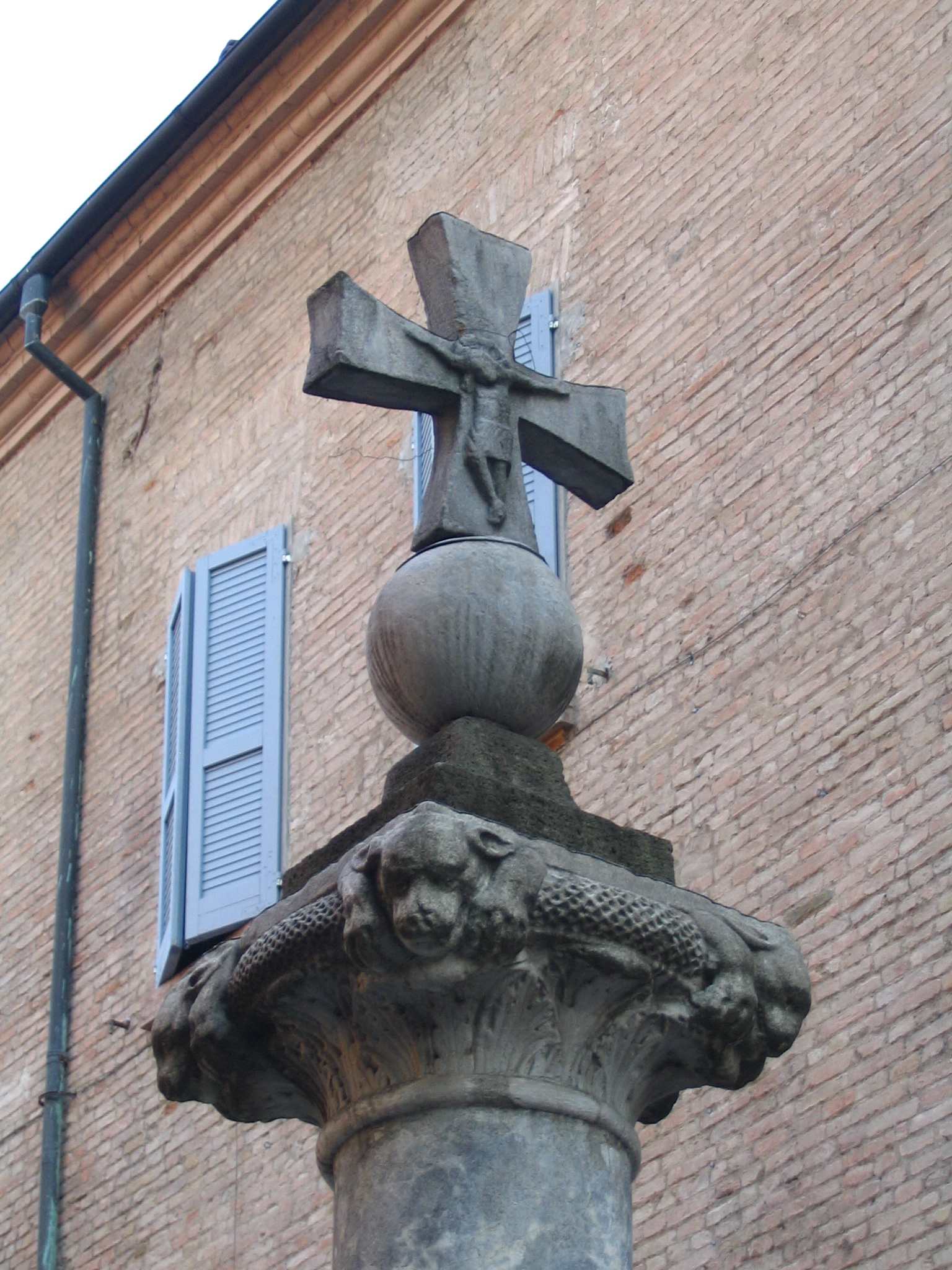
Croce di San Pietro, Modena

In front of the church, the column called Saint Peter’s Cross dates from before the 11th century.

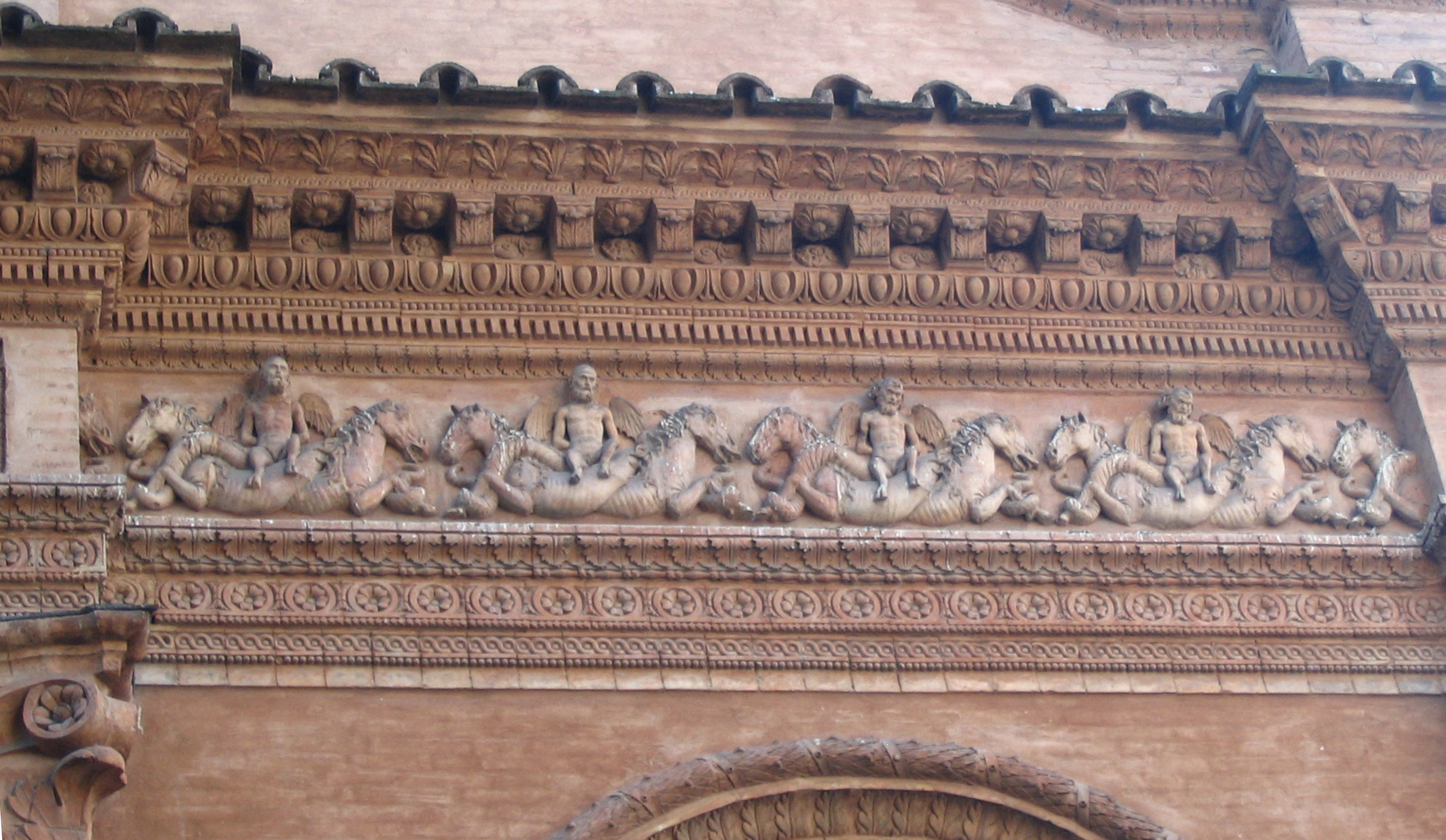
Frieze of San Pietro with hippocamps and satyrs

The external frieze of the church peculiarly depicts secular images of hippocamps and winged satyrs completed by the brothers Bisogni. The bell tower dates from 1629.

The interior was decorated during the early Renaissance by local artists, including six terracotta sculptures by Antonio Begarelli. The interior has altarpieces by Francesco Bianchi Ferrari, Ercole dell'Abate, Giacomo Cavedone, J. van Ghelde, Giovanni Battista Ingoni, Ludovico Lana, Pellegrino Munari, Girolamo Romanino, Carlo Ricci, Ercole Setti, Giovanni Taraschi, Francesco da Verona, and others.

The sixth chapel on the right contains an altarpiece by Giovanni Gherardo Dalle Catene depicting the Madonna, St Luke, and John the Evangelist.

The wooden choir was carved by Gian Francesco Testi. The 16th century organ was made by Giovanni Battista Facchetti. The sacristy has frescoes attributed to Girolamo da Vignola and engraved choir benches (1548) by Gianfrancesco da Cremona.

The monastery was suppressed during the French invasion of 1796, but re-opened with the restoration of the Duke of Modena. The monastery was again closed in 1866, although benedictines have remained parish priests.
