= Portrait of a Couple =

Painting by Niccolò dell'Abbate

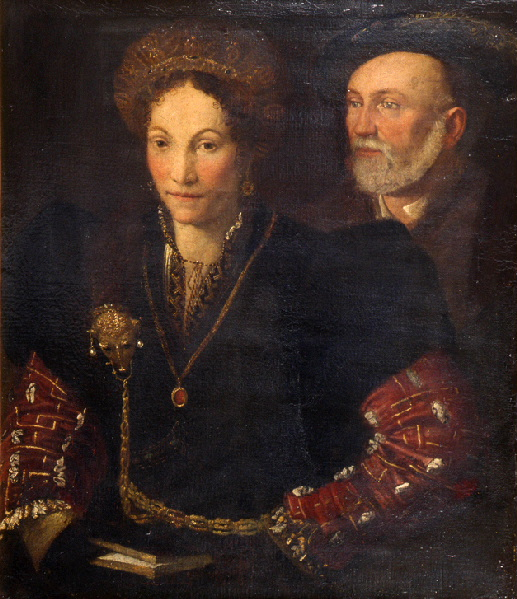
- Artist: Niccolò dell'Abbate
- Year: between 1537 and 1540
- Medium: oil painting on canvas
- Movement: Italian Renaissance; Portrait painting
- Subject: Giulio Boiardo, count of Scandiano, and his wife, Silvia Sanvitale
- Dimensions: 76 cm × 64 cm (30 in × 25 in)
- Location: Musée des Beaux-Arts, Strasbourg
- Accession: 1914

Portrait of a Couple is a portrait painting by Italian Renaissance artist Niccolò dell'Abbate, dated to c. 1537–1540. It is now in the Musée des Beaux-Arts of Strasbourg, France. Its inventory number is 641.

The painting depicts the count of Scandiano, Giulio Boiardo, of the House of Boiardo, and his wife, Silvia Sanvitale. It was bought in 1914 for the museum by Wilhelm von Bode with an attribution to Dosso Dossi, and that attribution (to Dossi or his circle) was maintained until 1997. Only since that date is the painting attributed with certainty to a young dell'Abbate, who painted it in Modena at the time when he was also working on other commissions for the Boiardo's palace, the Rocca dei Boiardo. The former title of the painting was A Duke of Ferrara and his Wife.

The double portrait of the count and countess is most unusual in that the emphasis is very much placed on the wife, who is depicted in the act of closing a book that she was just reading, while her husband almost timidly approaches from behind. It appears as a testament to Giulio Boiardo's admiration and love for Silvia Sanvitale's strong intellect and personality.
