= Alberto Fontana (painter) =

Italian painter

Alberto Fontana was born at Modena and was first active about the year 1537. He was a fellow-student with Niccolò dell'Abbate, under Antonio Begarelli, and in conjunction with Lodovico Brancolini, painted the panels (1546) of the Butchers' Hall at Modena; a work which is mostly executed in the style of Niccolò dell'Abbate. There is certainly a great similarity in their styles, but although Alberto Fontana resembles Niccolò in the airs of his heads, he is always unequal to him in his design, and there is something red and heavy in his colouring. He died in 1558. In the Estense Gallery at Modena are four figures in fresco representing Vigilance, Prudence, Hope, and Faith.
