= Alfredo Filippini =

Italian sculptor (1924–2020)

Alfredo Filippini (Ferrara, 22 October 1924 - Ferrara, 1 June 2020) was an Italian sculptor, painter and illustrator.

== Biography ==
=== Education ===
Born to Adolfo and Pasquarosa Contri, as a teenager, he worked as a craftsman at Donato Santini, a manufacturer of wooden toys from Ferrara. He was forced to leave his job following a tuberculous infection and to be hospitalized in Valtellina in a sanatorium. Here he met the painter from Cuneo Ego Bianchi, who gave him his first drawing and painting lessons. Having recovered and returned to Ferrara, he was one of the founders of the CAD artistic circle, with which he began to exhibit in the first group exhibitions starting from January 1946 at the foyer of the Municipal Theatre.

=== Painting ===
As a painter, he particularly cultivated the landscape genre, not neglecting sacred or mythological subjects of figure. Attracted by the chromatism that descended from the Venetian tradition, he performed numerous views of the Dolomites, the Romagna Riviera and the Ferrara plain. Between 1968 and 1971, he attended the Free School of Nude at the Academy of Fine Arts in Bologna following the courses of Mascalchi and Montanari.

In 1971, he painted, together with the painter Paolo Fabbri, the altarpiece of Blessed Michele Rua, destined for the Church of San Benedetto, Ferrara.

=== Copies and restorations ===
He also dedicated himself to copying various classical paintings by Titian, Paolo Veronese, Zurbaran and Tiepolo: the replica of Michelangelo's Doni tondo is still famous, enriched by a fine wooden frame in lime tree sculpted by him, with oak leaves and medallions of the eight districts of the Palio of Ferrara. For some works it reduces the measurements compared to the original, as for the Venus and Adonis by Paolo Veronese, while in others it keeps the scale 1: 1, as in the Baccanale degli Andrii by Titiano. (Note: Lucio Scardino, Uno scultore classicheggiante ferrarese: Alfredo Filippini, in Sulle sponde della Storia. Ricordi e studi in memoria di Ottorino Bacilieri, Ferrara, 2016, pp. 132)

As for the restorations, he devoted himself to sculptures and paintings, both ancient and modern.

=== Sculpture ===
One of the founders of the Amici dell'Arte Club, in 1982, he began attending the sculpture workshop held by his fellow citizen Laerte Milani at the private school in the former church of San Nicolò. Since then, he alternated the exercise of sculpture with easel painting, holding various personal exhibitions in many regions of Italy.

Attracted by mythological, sacred, sporting and symbolist themes, his production descended from the lesson of the Renaissance contaminated by the style of Milani with influences ranging from Arrigo Minerbi to Francesco Messina, also acquiring lessons that go beyond the purely naturalistic representation, admiring Canova but also the Verismo of Vincenzo Gemito or the multifaceted Giuseppe Virgili but also from the personal attendance of the colleague Ulderico Fabbri.

As proof of how deeply rooted he was in the Ferrara fabric, in the nineties he created the banners of some districts of the city Palio (Saint Giorgio, Saint Maurelio, Saint Romano) and the tomb of the young Adamo Toselli, flag-waver who died tragically, where he resumed the figure of the unicorn, dear to Borso d'Este and to the district of Santa Maria in Vado.

=== Illustrations ===
As an illustrator, he collaborated on various issues of the Ferrara magazine La Pianura and created dozens of drawings for Gianoberto Lupi for the book-strenna Capolavori per la caccia (Florence, 1994) and the cover of the volume Cani exteriors (Florence, 1998).

== Works ==
Among his main plastic works, the terracotta San Giovanni Battista placed in 2005 in a niche in Via Cortevecchia in Ferrara,

Replica of a fifteenth-century example now housed in the national Pinacoteca of Ferrara; the clay plaque walled up in the San Leo restaurant in Voghenza; the Fornaia today at the civic center of Pontelagoscuro; the Find in the Ottorino Bacilieri Picture Gallery located in the Voghiera Civic Museum at the Delizia di Belriguardo; Behind the door, today in the headquarters of the Bassani Foundation in the House of Ludovico Ariosto; the mad Orlando in the G. Ferraresi Archaeological Civic Museum in Stellata; an allegorical composition in painted terracotta entitled Sacrifice for a free life in the civic art gallery of Medole; clay works for the Certosa di Ferrara cemetery including the aforementioned Unicorn as well as several works in private collections both in Ferrara and not.

Long dean of the artists of Ferrara, lucid until the end of his days, he died at the age of 96 in a retirement home in Ferrara, leaving his home-studio in via Matteo Maria Boiardo.

== Main exhibitions ==
=== Personal ===
- For the 90th anniversary of Alfredo Filippini - Ferrara painter and sculptor by Lucio Scardino, Sala Mediolanum, Ferrara, 11/28 - 12/31/2014

=== Collective ===
- Puerto Sebastian - The myth of San Sebastiano in contemporary art, Renazzo di Cento, Sandro Parmeggiani Museum, 23/1 - 11/4/2010
- Galleria Carbone, Ferrara, 15/6 - 7/7/2013
- Sebastiano Ferrarese - 25 artists tell about the saint with arrows, curated by Lucio Scardino, Sala Mediolanum, Ferrara, 12/2 - 21/3/2016
- Lost Leda - 25 artists evoke Michelangelo's painting for Ferrara, curated by Lucio Scardino, Sala Mediolanum, Ferrara, 16/12/2016 - 10/1/2017
- Sebastiano inedito, curated by Lucio Scardino, Gate | Porta, Ferrara, 7-17 / 4/2017
- In the month of San Sebastiano, curated by Lucio Scardino, Galleria Cloister, Ferrara, 8-31 / 1/2019 2019
- Modern devotions - The cult and myth of St. George with the Dragon, curated by Lucio Scardino, Sala Mediolanum, Ferrara, 1 ° / 3 - 26/4/2019
- Water landscapes. Eighty years after the "Mulino del Po", curated by Lucio Scardino, FabulaFineArt Gallery, 27/9 - 15/10/2019
- Landscapes of Ferrara - With and without figures. 1900–2020, curated by Lucio Scardino, Mediolanum Room, Ferrara, 21/2 - 31/3/2020
- Exhibition curated by The Friends of Art, September 2020

== Bibliography ==
- Alfredo Filippini: dipinti e sculture a cura di Lucio Scardino con un testo di Andrea Samaritani e di Francesca Poltronieri, Bondeno, 2017
- Lucio Scardino, Uno scultore classicheggiante ferrarese: Alfredo Filippini, in Sulle sponde della Storia. Ricordi e studi in memoria di Ottorino Bacilieri, Ferrara, 2016
- Per i 90 anni di Alfredo Filippini, pittore e scultore ferrarese, a cura di Lucio Scardino, catalogo della mostra, 21/11 - 31/12/2014, Ferrara, 2014
- Anja Rossi, Addio a Filippini. L'arte ferrarese perde un amico, in Il Resto del Carlino, cronaca di Ferrara, 3 giugno 2020.
