= The Circumcision =

The Circumcision is a title for some of the many paintings of the circumcision of Jesus. Examples with articles include:

- The Circumcision (Parmigianino)
- The Circumcision (Rubens)
- The Circumcision (Signorelli)
- Circumcision of Christ (Guercino)
- Adoration of the Magi (Mantegna); a side panel depicts the Circumcision
- Roverella Altarpiece by Cosmè Tura; a predella panel depicts the Circumcision
