= Maurelius of Voghenza =

Syrian priest

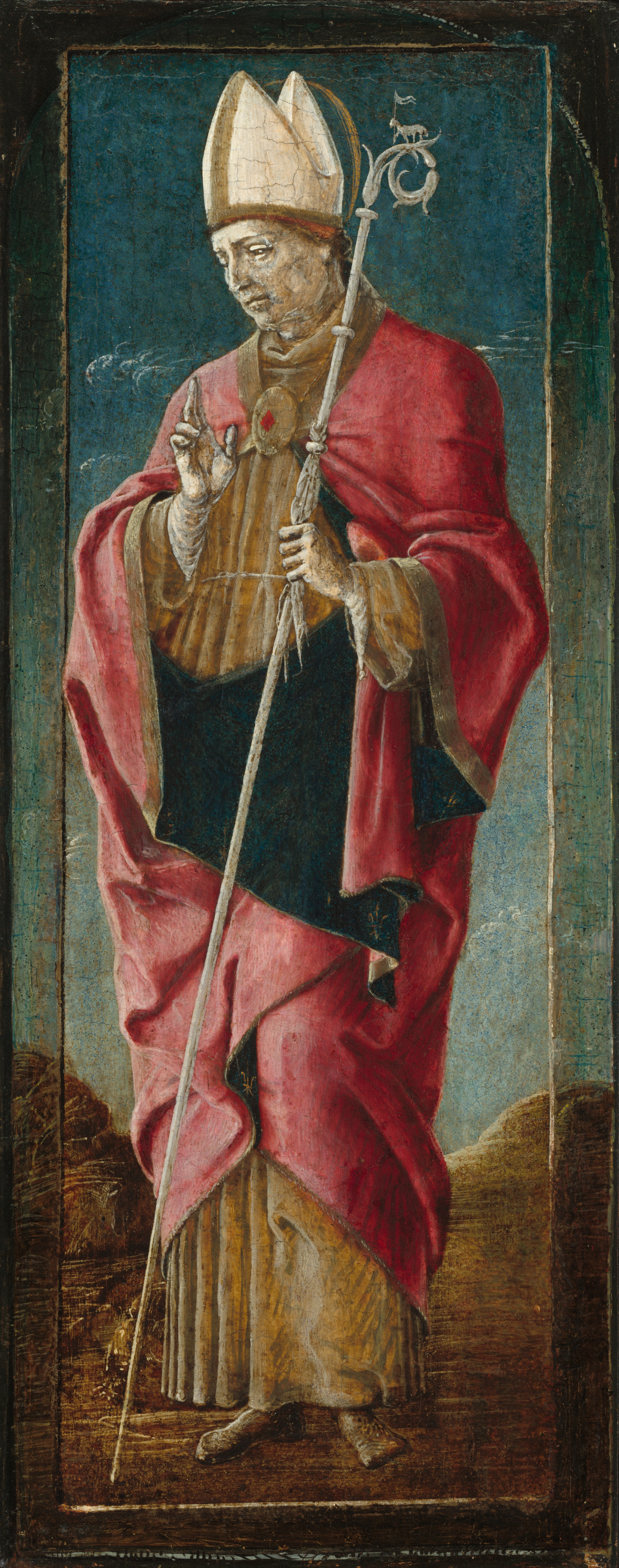
- Cosmè Tura, St Maurelius
- Born: Edessa, Byzantine Empire
- Died: 7 May 644 possibly Edessa, Rashidun Caliphate
- Venerated in: Roman Catholic Church
- Major shrine: Basilica of San Giorgio fuori le mura, Ferrara
- Feast: 7 May

Maurelius of Voghenza (Italian - San Maurelio; died 7 May 644) was a Syrian priest, who became bishop of Voghenza. He is venerated as a saint by the Roman Catholic Church.

== Life ==
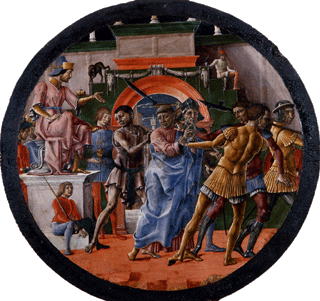
Cosmè Tura, Trial of St Maurelius (c. 1480)

Little information survives on his life, though a Latin account of it was written in 1489, Legendary and Life and Miracles of Saint Maurelius. This stated that Maurelius was born in Edesa as one of the sons of Theobald, the pagan king of Mesopotamia. Two more sons were born to his father when Maurelius was aged 18, named Hippolytus and Rivallus. When Maurelius reached the age of 30 he revealed to his father that he had converted to Christianity but his father refused permission for him to continue living as a Christian. He succeeded his father on his death, but passed the throne to Hippolytus soon afterwards to follow his faith more closely, beginning spiritual instruction under Theophilus of Antioch, bishop of Smirne, who finally ordained him a priest.

Theophilus then authorised him to examine the heretic abbot Severinus of Noricum, who refused to obey the order to come to be tried. Maurelius was then invited to Rome by Pope John IV to explain how this heterodoxy had occurred and how best to counter it. During his journey towards Rome he had a vision of an angel, who revealed Severinus' death. Maurelius thus decided to return to Smirne, but a storm forced his ship into Ostia. He thus decided to visit St Peter's Basilica in nearby Rome to receive the pope's blessing. Several pilgrims from Voghenza were also at the papal audience to ask for a successor to their recently-dead bishop Oldrado. During the audience the pope had a vision of Saint George, who ordered him to choose Maurelius as the new bishop. Maurelius accepted and travelled to Voghenza, where he celebrated his first mass as bishop. During it a hand appear blessing him and words were heard praising him for renouncing earthly honours to embrace Christianity. He also cured a blind girl and another vision predicted a set of sufferings in his future.

The tradition and the sources diverge at this point. The Legendary states that messengers arrived from Edessa to state that Rivallus had renounced Christianity and killed Hipolytus. Maurelius returned to Edessa, where Rivallus arrested, tortured and killed him. Other more historical sources argue Maurelius was the victim of a power struggle between the Exarchate of Ravenna and the papacy for control of territories under Byzantine rule - Maurelius favoured the papal side, leading to both his martyrdom and his canonisation.

== Cult ==
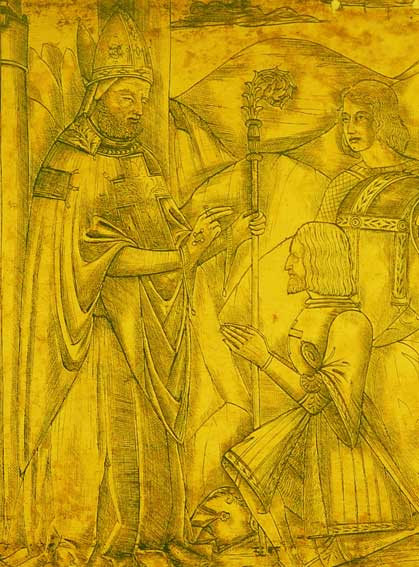
Alfonso d'Este and Saint Maurelius. Ferrara, church of San Giorgio.

In 1106 Henry V, Holy Roman Emperor had a vision of the saint and translated his relics to the church of San Giorgio in Ferrara. This led to a more intense veneration of the saint and in 1463 he was made Ferrara's patron saint. The saint also became a major subject in Ferrarese art, such as Cosmè Tura's 1470 Saint Maurelius Altarpiece for San Giorgio church. His relics are now in the Basilica of San Giorgio fuori le mura in Ferrara.

== Bibliography ==
- (in Italian) José-Apeles Santolaria de Puey y Cruells, Annuario Diocesano 2017. Arcidiocesi di Ferrara-Comacchio, Ferrara, Archidiocesis Ferrariensis, 2016.
- (in Italian) Romeo Sgarbanti, Ferrara nascita di una città (dopo le leggende, la storia), edited by Carlo Bassi, Sabbioncello San Pietro (Ferrara), 2G Editrice, 2008, SBN IT\ICCU\UFE\0897723.
- (in Italian) Carlo Bassi, Breve ma veridica storia di Ferrara, Ferrara, 2G Libri, 2015, ISBN 88-89248-06-8.
