= Strabonia gens =

Ancient Roman family

The gens Strabonia was an obscure plebeian family at ancient Rome. No members of this gens are mentioned by ancient writers, but several are known from inscriptions.

== Origin ==
The nomen Strabonius belongs to a class of gentilicia derived primarily from cognomina ending in -o. The surname Strabo was originally applied to a person known for squinting, part of a large group of cognomina deriving from the physical traits and characteristics of an individual.

== Praenomina ==
All of the Strabonii found in inscriptions bear common praenomina, including Gaius, Publius, Titus, and Quintus.

== Members ==
This list includes abbreviated praenomina. For an explanation of this practice, see filiation.

- Strabonia, probably the mother of [...]ennius, a person buried at Perusia in Etruria.
- Gaius Strabonius, dedicated a monument at Vazuanis in Numidia for his wife, Octavia Successa, aged seventy.
- Strabonius Datianus, a soldier in the first urban cohort at Rome, mentioned in a monument from Tunes in Africa Proconsularis, dating from AD 230.
- Strabonia Euphrosyne, dedicated a monument for her friend, Caesidia Ionis, at Vicohabentia in Cisalpine Gaul, dating to the late second or early third century.
- Strabonia C. l. Eutychia, a freedwoman buried at Julia Concordia in Venetia and Histria, in a late first- or early second-century tomb dedicated by Vettia Anthis.
- Publius Strabonius P. f. Eutychus, buried at Rome, along with his sisters, Vipsania Glypte and Munia Trophime, in a tomb built by their father, Publius Strabonius Primigenius.
- Quintus Strabonius Honoratianus, buried at Bulla Regia in Africa Proconsularis.
- Publius Strabonius Primigenius, dedicated a sepulchre at Rome for his children, Vipsania Glypte, Publius Strabonius Eutychus, and Munia Trophime.
- Titus Strabonius Primigenius, together with his wife, Quinta Laodamia, dedicated a second-century tomb at Rome for their daughter, Strabonia Venusta.
- Strabonia Prisca, the mistress of Clado, a slave named in an inscription from Alba Fucens in Sabinum.
- Strabonia Secundilla, along with her daughter, Trebius Rufilla, dedicated a tomb at Trasacco in Sabinum to her husband, Gaius Trebius Optatus.
- Gaius Strabonius C. l. Tremissus, a freedman named in an inscription from Ateste in Venetia and Histria.
- Strabonia Venusta, dedicated a tomb at Rome for Titus Statilius Clarus, her husband of fourteen years.
- Strabonia T. f. Venusta, buried at Rome, aged nine years, six months, in a second-century tomb dedicated by her parents, Titus Strabonius Primigenius and Quinta Laodamia.
- Strabonia Victorina, buried at the present site of Lendava, formerly part of Pannonia Superior, aged thirty-nine, with a monument from her husband, Gaius Julius Severinus, a veteran of the Legio I Adiutrix. In an adjoining tomb was their friend, Gaius Ulpius Licinius.

== See also ==
- List of Roman gentes

== Bibliography ==
- Theodor Mommsen et alii, Corpus Inscriptionum Latinarum (The Body of Latin Inscriptions, abbreviated CIL), Berlin-Brandenburgische Akademie der Wissenschaften (1853–present).
- Supplementa Italica (Supplement for Italy), Unione Accademica Nazionale.
- René Cagnat et alii, L'Année épigraphique (The Year in Epigraphy, abbreviated AE), Presses Universitaires de France (1888–present).
- George Davis Chase, "The Origin of Roman Praenomina", in Harvard Studies in Classical Philology, vol. VIII, pp. 103–184 (1897).
