= Pietà (Cosmè Tura) =

c. 1460 painting by Cosimo Tura

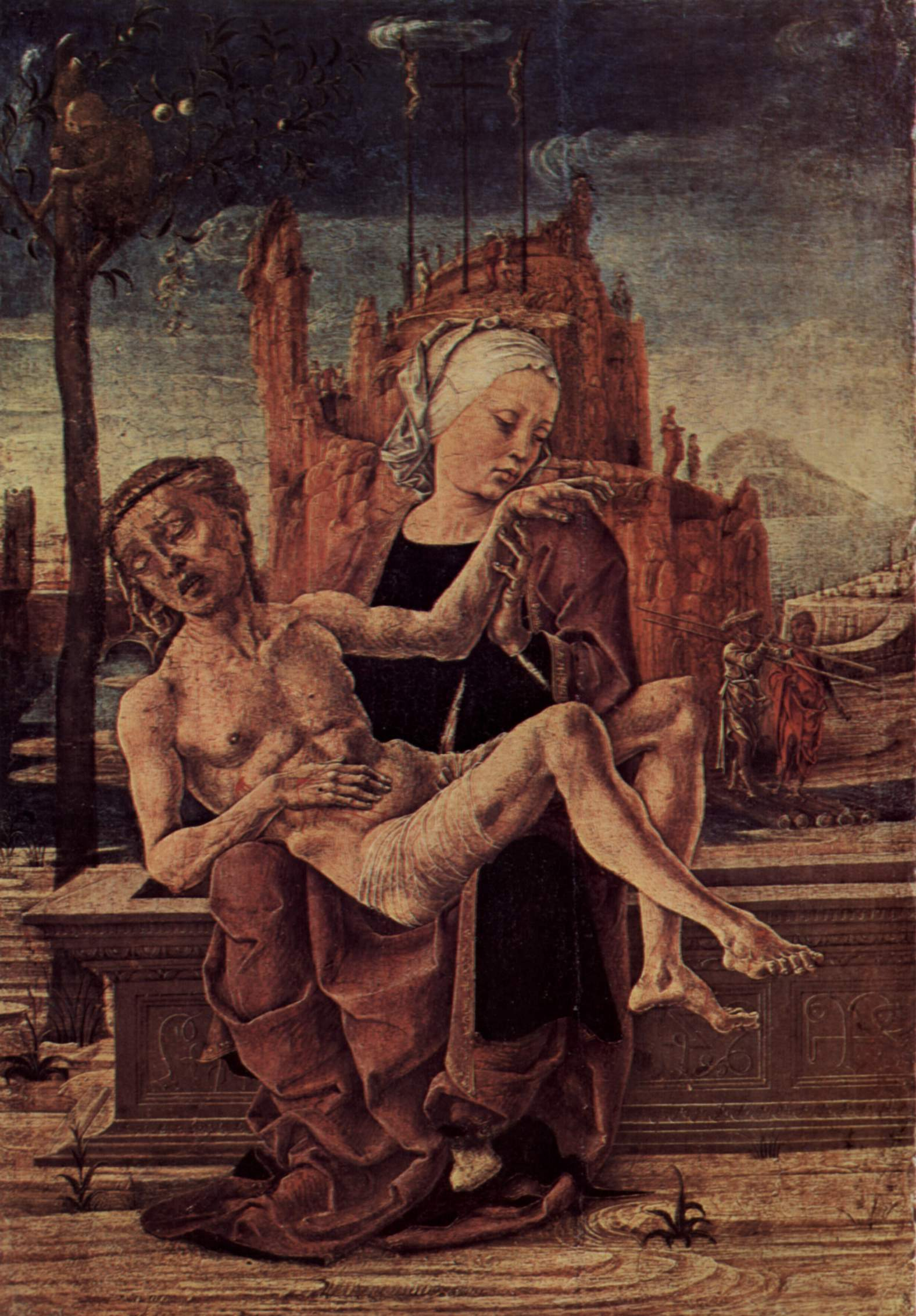
Pietà (c. 1460) by Cosmè Tura

Pietà is a tempera on panel painting by Cosmè Tura, measuring 47.7 cm by 33.5 cm. It is now in the Museo Correr in Venice, to which it was bequeathed with the rest of the collection of Teodoro Correr on 1 January 1830. It was attributed to Luca d'Olanda until 1859, when Vincenzo Lazari recognised it as a work by Tura. By comparison with Tura's Calliope and his Roverella Altarpiece, it has been dated to around 1460.

== Description and style ==
The work represents traditional iconography, that of Vesperbild, slightly revisited, where the dimension of pain is sublimated. Mary is seen seated on the edge of the vault, in the center of the composition, holding the body of her dead son; the Calvary is in the background. The pictorial quality is very high, in some points the underlying drawing made directly on the plaster layer is visible, it can be admired a wise use of lacquers and oil glazing. The work is rich in symbols and meanings, among these, the most curious is on the left of the viewer: in the corner, near a ruinous fall of color, you can see a monkey on the top of a tree that reminds of the inferior nature of man compared to the divine. Stylistically, therefore, it is fully in line with the Ferrarese painting of the late fifteenth century, between Nordic influences and the interpretation of the novelties brought by Andrea Mantegna in nearby Padua.
