= Cosmè Tura =

Italian painter (c.1430–1495)

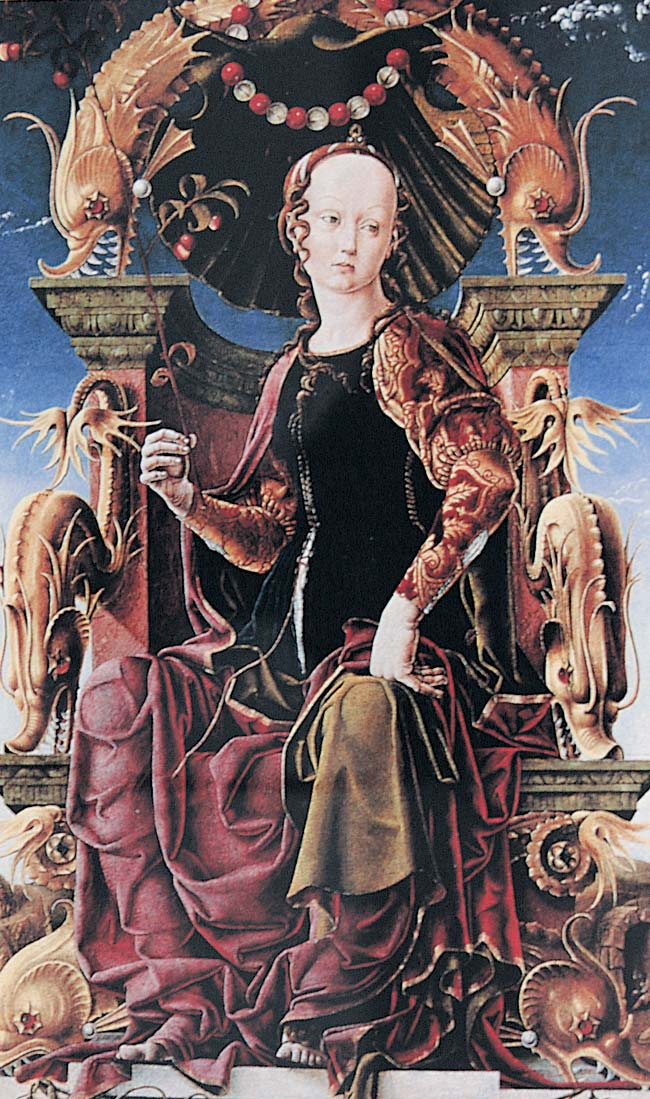
- An Allegorical Figure (Calliope), c. 1460
- Born: c. 1430; Ferrara, Duchy of Ferrara
- Died: 1495 (aged 64–65); Ferrara, Duchy of Ferrara
- Known for: Painting
- Movement: Quattrocento or early-Renaissance

Cosmè Tura (Italian pronunciation: [koˈzmɛ tˈtuːra]; c. 1430 – 1495), also known as Il Cosmè or Cosimo Tura, was an Italian early-Renaissance (or Quattrocento) painter and considered one of the founders of the School of Ferrara. He provided a great contribution to the Renaissance in Ferrara.

== Biography ==
=== Formation ===
Born in Ferrara, of humble origins, he was the son of a shoemaker named Domenico. There is no record of Cosmè's apprenticeship, which Vasari linked to the mysterious artist Galasso Galassi of Ferrara, an elusive and thinly documented figure, linked by friendship to Piero della Francesca.

The first historical documents concerning him are dated to the years 1451–1452, when he decorated some objects for the court of the ruling Este family, Dukes of Ferrara, such as flags bearing coats of arms of the family destined for display at the Castle, or a helmet to be awarded as a tournament prize. Such works as these were a staple among the commissions received by an artist's workshop in the day and represented a major source of income. It may also be that Tura was able to find work among the court illuminators.

From mid-1452 to April 1456, no other documents attest to Tura's presence in Ferrara, which has led to the suggestion that he may have undertaken a journey, perhaps spending time in Venice or in Padua. In fact, numerous elements in his works seem to suggest a local stylistic influence from Padua in particular. It may have been that the Este themselves sponsored his apprenticeship journey, in the light of his precocious artistic skills. A notable feature of the scene in Padua was the thriving workshop of Francesco Squarcione, an important seedbed of talent in northern Italy, one from which emerged many masters, such as Carlo Crivelli, Michael Pacher and above all Andrea Mantegna, all of them contributors to diffusion of the Renaissance style.

It might have been from such an experience in Padua that Tura drew his taste for clear and sharp signs and for decorative exuberance, with citations of the antique, which he then took to extreme levels. Moreover, Squarcione served to introduce and disseminate some of the Tuscan innovations brought to Padua by Donatello, such as the use of linear perspective, the strong, squared lines of the forms and the skilful rendering of expression given to human figures.

Another fundamental master for Tura was Piero della Francesca, whom he may have met in person in Ferrara in 1458–1459. From Piero he borrowed a sense for the geometric spatial construction, a monumental spirit and a use of sharp and clear lighting, which he used above all in his backgrounds. A third fundamental element of input was the work of Flemish artists, also represented in Ferrara among the collections maintained by the Marquis. From these, Tura acquired a taste for minute observation of detail and for the use of oil paint to render the differing textures of materials depicted, from the glitter of gems to the soft reflections of velvet.

=== Under Borso d'Este ===
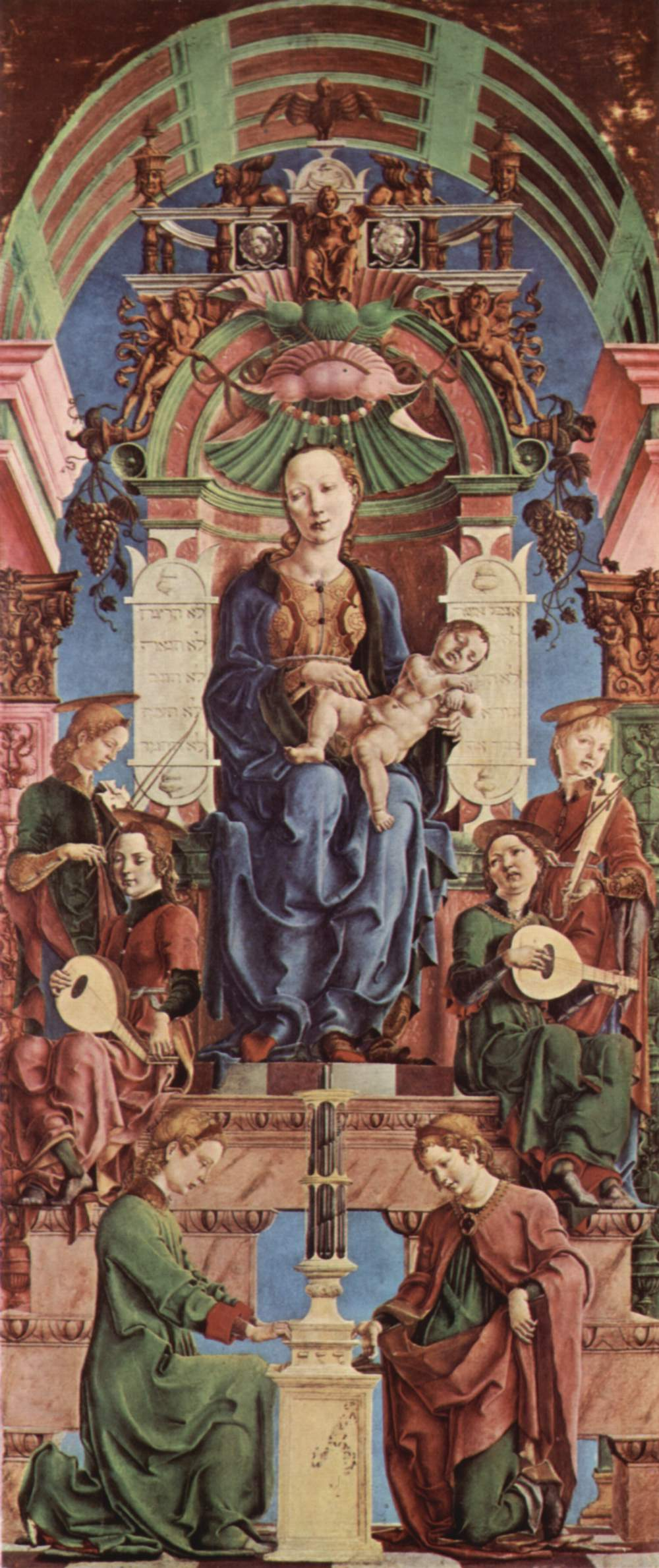
Madonna Roverella (1470-1474), National Gallery, London

In 1456, Tura returned to Ferrara, where he became a painter in the full sense, appearing on the court salary rolls, even with residence in the Castle. This testifies to his occupying a post as court painter, replacing Angelo di Pietro da Siena (also called Angelo Maccagnino or Angelo Parrasio), who had died on August 5 of that year. In Ferrara Tura worked for the rest of his active life for Borso d'Este and Ercole I d'Este. With a lively personality and a variety of skills, he was present in all the artistic manifestations of the Este court. Throughout the fifty years of Tura's artistic life, the various successive Dukes made use of his talents in the most disparate works: this swas the norm for court artists of the time, who experienced no rigid compartmentalization of tasks. In addition to practising his art as a skilled painter, Tura was also a set designer for parties and tournaments, a decorator and designer of furniture, clothes, blankets, pottery, and a draftsman of tapestry cartoons.

Among his earliest works, we hear of a lost lunette for the door of the cathedral. Works usually attributed to this period include the Madonna and Child with Saints (the Fesch Museum in Ajaccio) and a Madonna and Child (National Gallery of Art, in Washington, D.C.).

In 1458, records place Tura at work in the Studiolo of the Palace Belfiore, where he continued Maccagnino's work, probably also repainting some of the works he started (Terpsichore of the Poldi Pezzoli Museum in Milan and the Calliope of the National Gallery in London).

By 1460, Tura was given a stipend by the court. His known pupils include Francesco del Cossa and Francesco Bianchi.

In the years following he worked on frescoes, such as in the chapel of Francesco Sacrati in San Domenico (1467) and the Tales of the Virgin in the so-called "Delight" of Belriguardo (in 1469-1472) for Borso d'Este, cycles now both lost but known from the sources.

Although these were years of feverish activity, only the grandiose doors of the organ of Ferrara Cathedral now remain, paid for on 2 June 1469. Here Tura painted the Annunciation on one side and St. George and the princess on the other. He collaborated in the painting of a series of "muses" for the Belfiore "studiolo", of Leonello d'Este in Ferrara, including the allegorical figure of Calliope, already mentioned, now at London's National Gallery. While the individual attributions are often debated, among the artists thought to have contributed to the series were Angelo di Pietro da Siena and Michele Pannonio.

One of the houses occupied by Tura during his time as painter in Ferrara was certainly located in the "Via delle Vecchie", which for a long time was named "Strada del Tura" after him for this reason. It is possibly a sign that he also died there.

=== Under Ercole I ===
With the rise to power of Ercole I d'Este (1471), Tura was appointed court portraitist, a role he devoted himself to until 1486 when he was replaced by the younger Ercole de' Roberti.

The Roverella Altarpiece or Roverella Polyptych was commissioned by Cardinal Bartolomeo Roverella for the San Giorgio fuori le mura (St George outside the Walls) in Ferrara in memory of his brother, the Bishop of Ferrara, Lorenzo Roverella, it was executed by Tura in 1470–1474 using oil and egg-tempera on poplar panel work. The original painted by Tura was later dismembered and the panels split up between several museums. The central part is in the National Gallery in London, and depicts the Madonna and Child seated on an elaborate throne and surrounded by musician angels.

Tura also worked on the decorations of rooms, studies and the library of Giovanni Pico della Mirandola. In Ferrara, he is represented by frescoes in the Palazzo Schifanoia (1469–71). This pleasure palace, with facade and architecture of little note, belonged to the d'Este family and is located just outside the medieval town walls. Along with Francesco del Cossa and Ercole de' Roberti, Tura helped produce an allegorical series about the months of the year and symbols of the zodiac The series contains contemporary portraits of musicians, laborers, and carnival floats in idyllic parades. As in Piero della Francesca's world, the figures mill about in classical serenity. This is considered the greatest collective essay of the Ferrara school as well as one of the most singular pictorial cycles of the European Renaissance.

Despite his attachment to the Este family, to whom he gave virtually the whole of his life's work, and despite having been the leader of a group of Emilian artists, Cosmè Tura died poor and weary. This is attested by a letter he wrote in 1490 to Duke Ercole, asking for payment of one of his works, perhaps the marvelous depiction of the Franciscan St Anthony of Padua which is currently in the Galleria Estense in Modena, stating "I do not know how to live and survive in this way, not finding work or opportunity to support my family and myself".

The events of the history of Ferrara, with the ruinous trajectory of decline of the dukes at the end of the 16th century, led to the destruction of most of Tura's works.

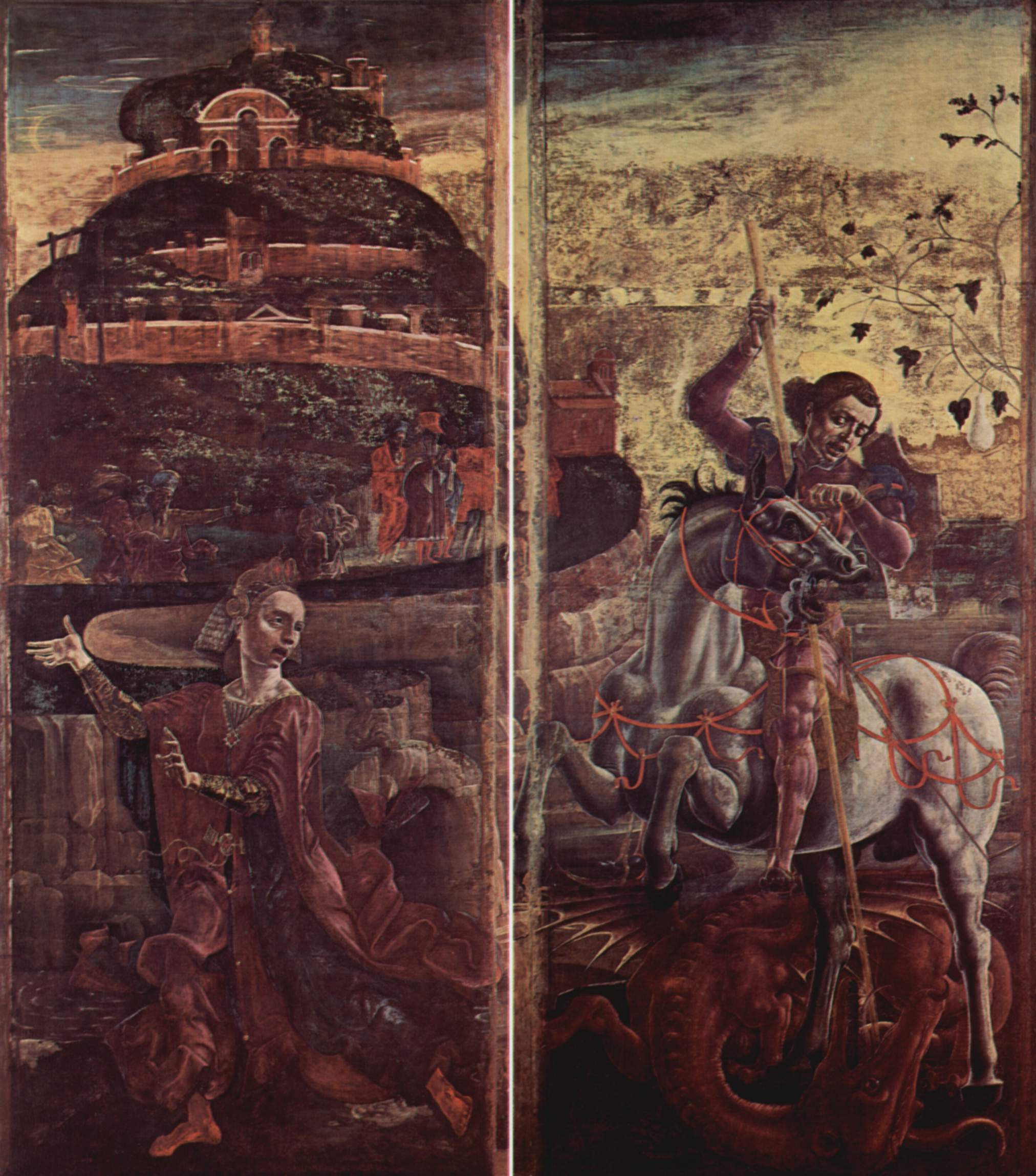
St. George and the Dragon, Ferrara Cathedral Organ Case, 1469

== Style ==
Tura's painting is endowed with great originality in the Italian panorama of the time, featuring lavishly decorated compositions and an almost sculptural plasticity of the figures, in an apparent realism that belongs more to fantasy rather than reality. The colors are bright and unreal, which often make the subjects seem like metal or stone, immersed in a tense and surreal atmosphere, with a dreamlike feeling. The experiences derived from the courtly art of international Gothic, aimed at celebration, are blended and transformed through the influence of the Paduan Renaissance, Piero della Francesca and Flemish painting. The meticulous search for details and impossible landscapes is found again later in painters of the Danube school.

== Selected works ==
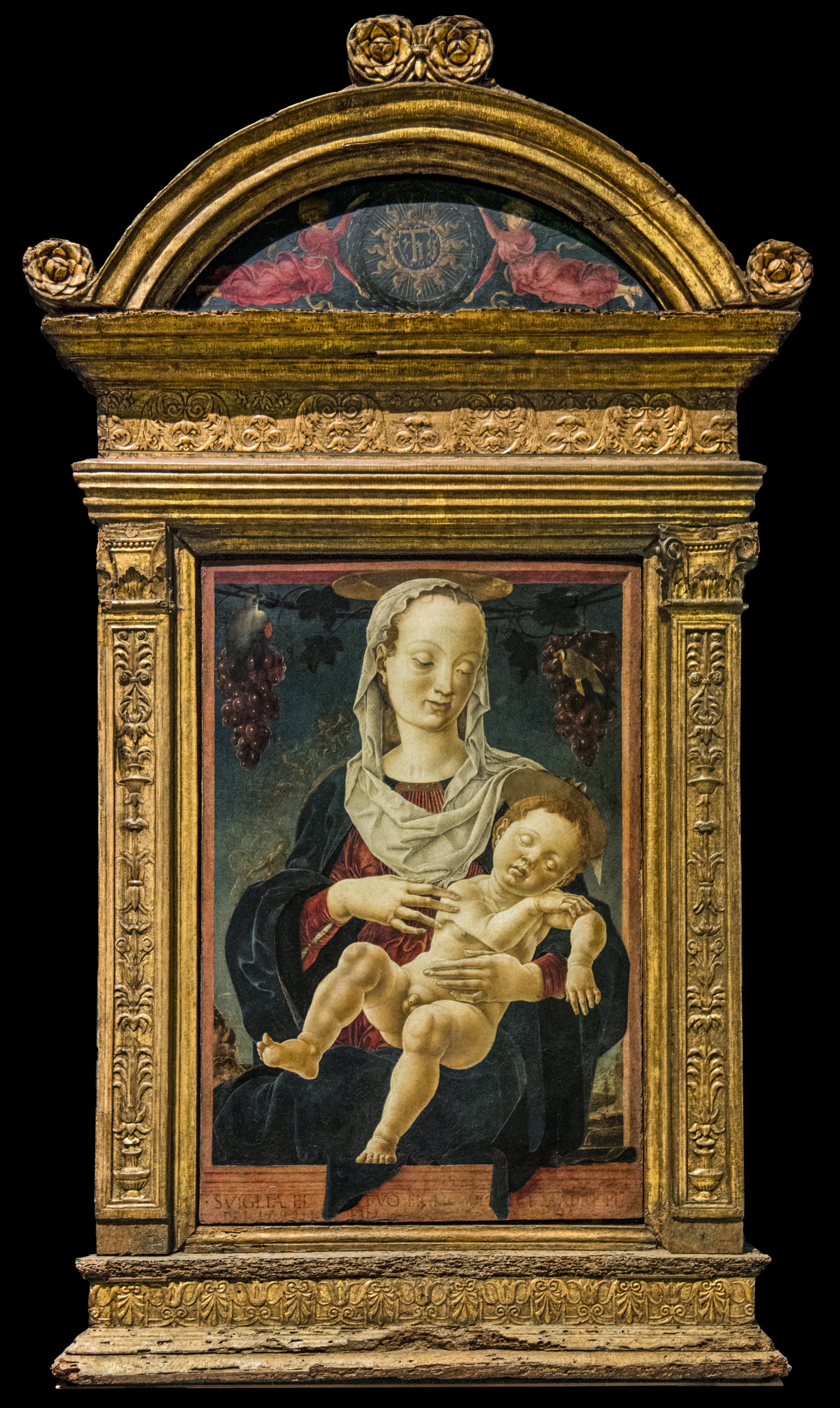
Madonna of the Zodiac, Gallerie dell'Accademia

- Saint George - San Diego Museum of Art
- Pieta (c. 1460) - Museo Correr, Venice
- Judgment of Saint Maurelius and Martyrdom of Saint Maurelius (1470s) - Pinacoteca Nazionale, Ferrara
- The Circumcision of Christ (1470s) - Isabella Stewart Gardner Museum, Boston
- Madonna and Child (1455) - National Gallery of Art, Washington D.C.
- Portrait of Eleonora d'Aragona, Duchess of Ferrara - Pierpont Morgan Library, New York
- Spring or the muse "Calliope" (1460) - National Gallery, London
- The Princess (1470) - Museo del Duomo, Ferrara
- St. John the Evangelist in Patmos (c. 1470–1475) - Thyssen-Bornemisza Museum, Madrid
- St. George and the Dragon (1469) - Museo del Duomo, Ferrara
- Madonna Enthroned (1474) - National Gallery, London
- St. Sebastian - Gemäldegalerie, Dresden, Germany
- St. Dominic - Uffizi, Florence
- Pietà, (Louvre)
- Side Panels from a Portable Triptych Showing Saints Peter and John the Baptist (c. 1473) - Philadelphia Museum of Art
- St. Anthony of Padua Reading - Louvre, Paris
- Saint Nicholas - Musée des Beaux-Arts de Nantes
- St Anthony of Padua (c.1484-1490) - Galleria Estense, Modena
- Letter A, miniature from choirbook (Metropolitan Museum, New York)

== Bibliography ==
- Haldane Macfall, History of Painting: The Renaissance in Venice Part Two, page 34, ISBN 1-4179-4507-9.
