= Saint Maurelius Altarpiece =

Oil on panel painting by Cosmè Tura

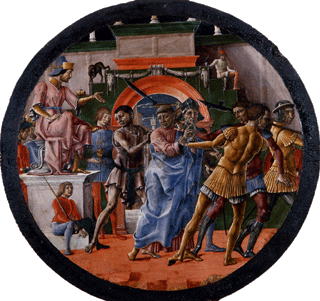
Trial of Saint Maurelius

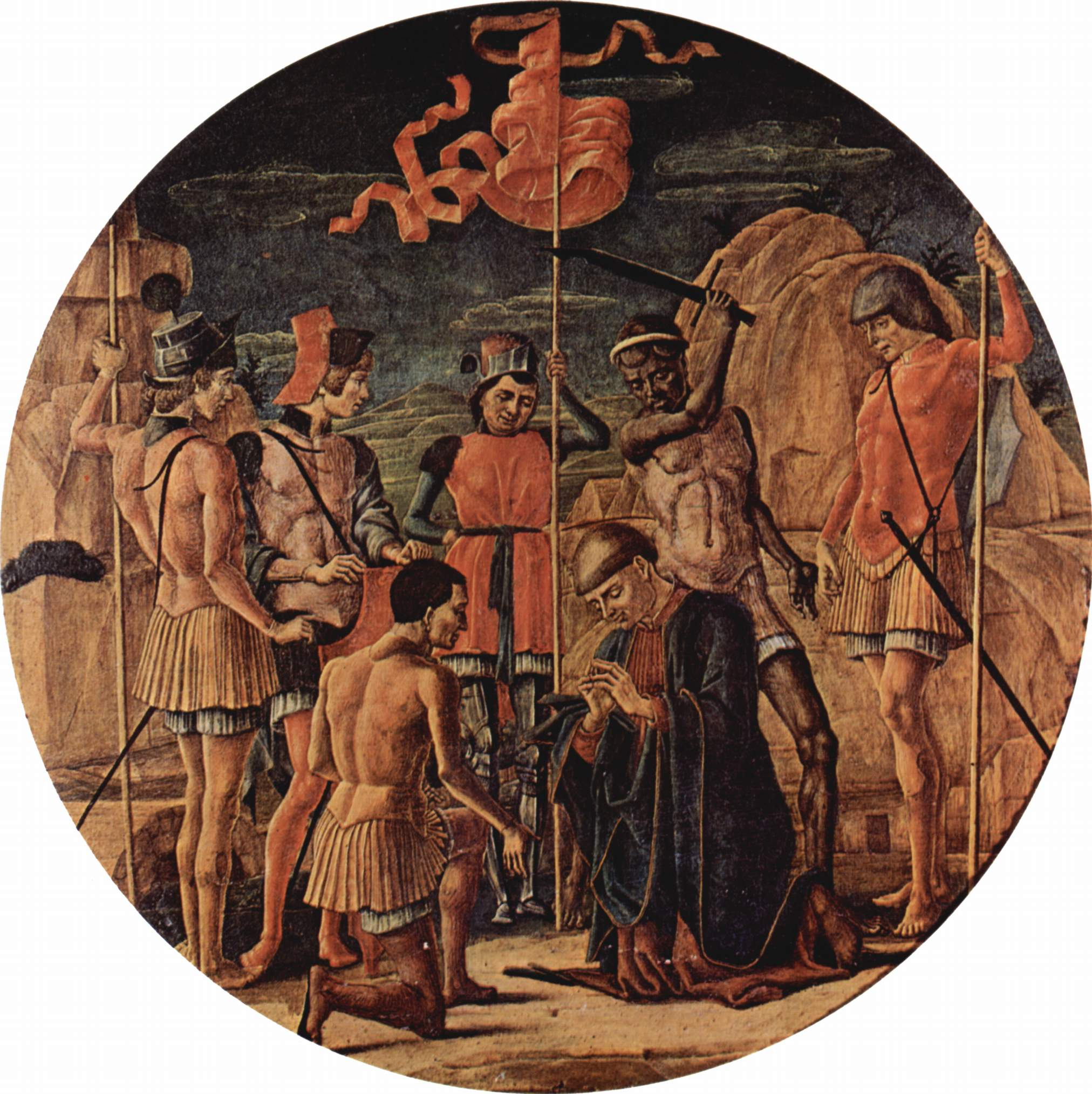
Martyrdom of Saint Maurelius

The Saint Maurelius Altarpiece was an oil on panel painting by Cosmè Tura, executed c. 1480, produced for the church of San Giorgio fuori le mura, site of Maurelius of Voghenza's shrine. Two tondos from it survive, Trial of St Maurelius and Martyrdom of St Maurelius, both now in the city's Pinacoteca Nazionale.

It was commissioned in the 1470s during a rebuilding of the church prior to its reconsecration. The work's original structure is unknown, but probably had a now-lost central panel of Maurelius himself with a number of panels (perhaps six) with episodes from his life, the only two survivors of which are the Pinacoteca panels. The two panels are the right shape perhaps to have formed part of a predella, though they are larger than the usual size for such panels - the tondi of the Roverella Altarpiece by the same artist are 38 cm in diameter.

The altarpiece fell into disrepair and in 1635 was replaced by one on the same subject by Guercino. The two tondos were moved to the church's sacristy and then possibly to the neighbouring monastery. They came into the possession of Filippo Zafferini and in 1817 he passed them to Ferrara town council. The two paintings are among only a few of Tura's works still in Ferrara.
