= Sabadino degli Arienti =

Italian author

- Born: Giovanni Sabadino degli Arienti; 1445; Bologna
- Died: 1510 (aged 65); Bologna
- Occupations: Humanist, author, poet, writer and politician

Giovanni Sabadino degli Arienti (Bologna 1445 – Bologna 1510) was an Italian humanist, author, poet and prose writer.

Born in Bologna, he first served as a secretary for Count Andrea Bentivoglio, and then from 1491 was the client of Ercole d'Este in Ferrara. His most famous work Novelle Porretane (1483) is a collection of sixty-one tales in imitation of Boccacio's Decameron. In De Triumphis Religionis, a treatise on the virtues of a prince, he described the court of Ercole d'Este as an exemplar of the virtue of magnificence. Long relegated to obscurity by critics of his "arid" style, Arienti has enjoyed more appreciation recently for his attempt to create a Bolognese literary vernacular.

In 1492, two years after the arrival of Isabella d'Este in Mantua, she was presented with a collection of female biographies dedicated to Ginevra Bentivoglio which was written by Sabadino degli Arienti. At the end of 1400, Sabadino degli Arienti wrote a description of the palace of Belriguardo.

Carolyn James, the Cassamarca Lecturer in the School of Historical Studies at Monash University, Melbourne, Australia, is the author of two books based on Sabadino degli Arienti.

== Works ==
In his collection of short stories from the late 15th century, Novelle Porretane (1483), Sabadino degli Arienti includes the story of a valet, who, unhappy with his social position, asks his lord to knight him. In Ginevera de le clare donne (1490) he praised the elite to which Isabella belonged, and to whom she was related by birth and marriage, while offering her a congenial model of behaviour to follow in her new role as marchioness.

- De Hymeneo (1487)
- De Triumphis Religionis
- Descrizione del giardino della Viola (1501)

== Bibliography ==
- Broad, Jacqueline; Green, Karen (23 July 2007). Virtue, Liberty, and Toleration: Political Ideas of European Women, 1400-1800. Springer Science & Business Media. p. 216. ISBN 9781402058950.
