= Madonna of the Zodiac =

Painting by Cosimo Tura

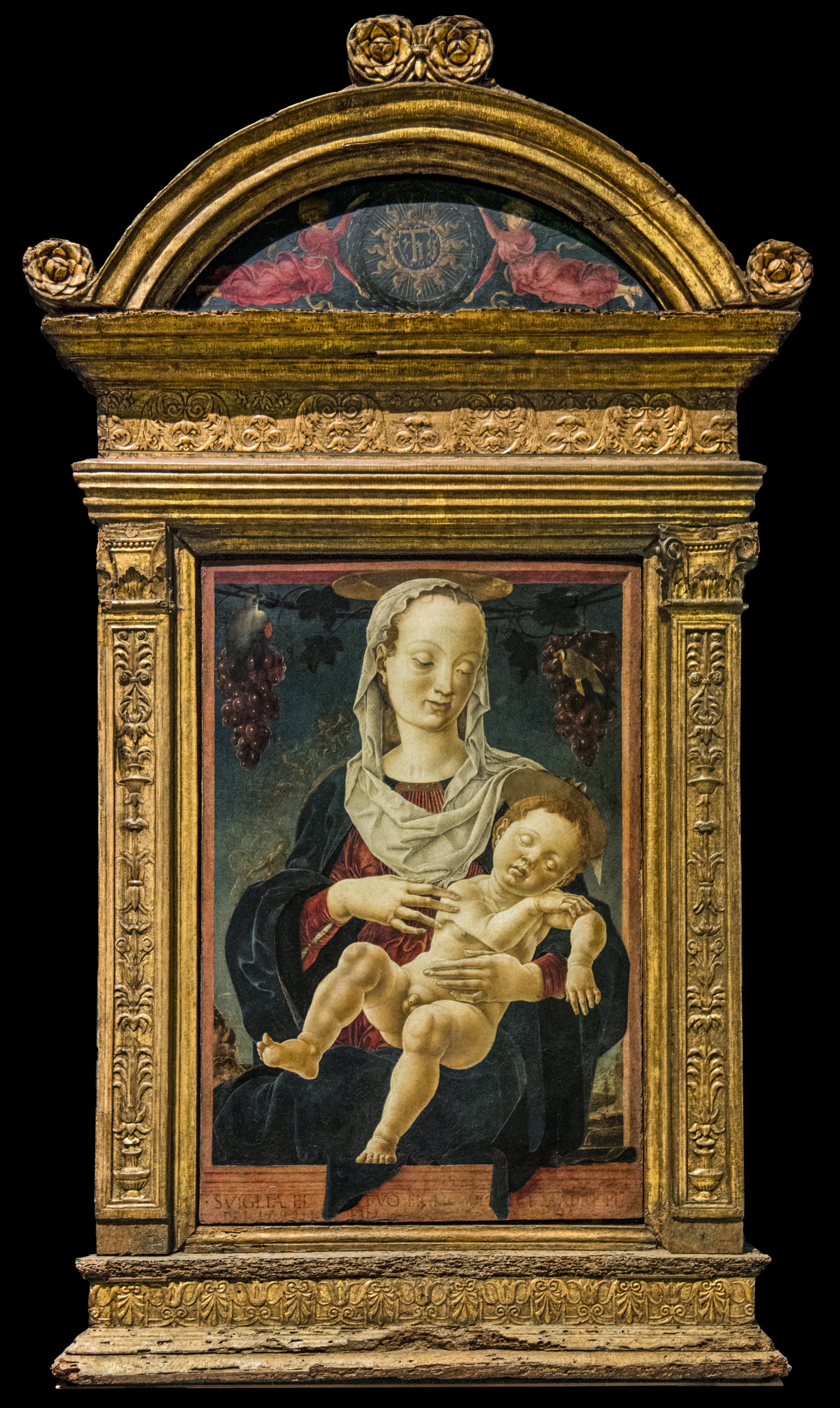
Madonna of the Zodiac (c. 1459–1463) by Cosmè Tura

The Madonna of the Zodiac (Italian - Madonna dello Zodiaco) is a c.1459–1463 tempera on panel painting by Cosmè Tura, named after the partly-lost gold outline of a zodiac behind the Madonna, alluding to Christ's role as "chronocrator" (lord of cosmic time). It is now in the Gallerie dell'Accademia in Venice.

It originated in Merlana and once belonged to the Bertoldi family. It may have been produced for the historic chapel of San Nicola (now destroyed, with only one capital remaining), which for a long while was a private oratory of the Bertoldi family. At the base is the inscription "SVIGLIA EL TUO FIGLIO DOLCE MADRE PIA / PER FAR INFIN FELICE L'ALMA MIA". Above the work is a lunette with angels holding IHS, a symbol promoted by Bernardino of Siena.

== Description and style ==
Inside a fake wooden frame, the Madonna looks out with the Child in her arms, between two hanging grapes with goldfinches on them, a double reference to the Eucharistic sacrifice of Jesus.

Behind Mary, who looks at her sleeping son with a sweet expression, we see one zodiac outlined in gold (partly lost), which alludes to Christ's role as "chronicler", that is, lord of cosmic Time. The signs of Aquarius and Pisces are particularly recognizable, while others have been lost. Mary wears a blue cloak, a red robe and a white veil on her head, embossed with metallic folds as typical of the artist's style. Everything is illustrated with a precise graphic sign and with "enameled" effect colors.
