= Saint Dominic (Tura) =

Painting by Cosmè Tura

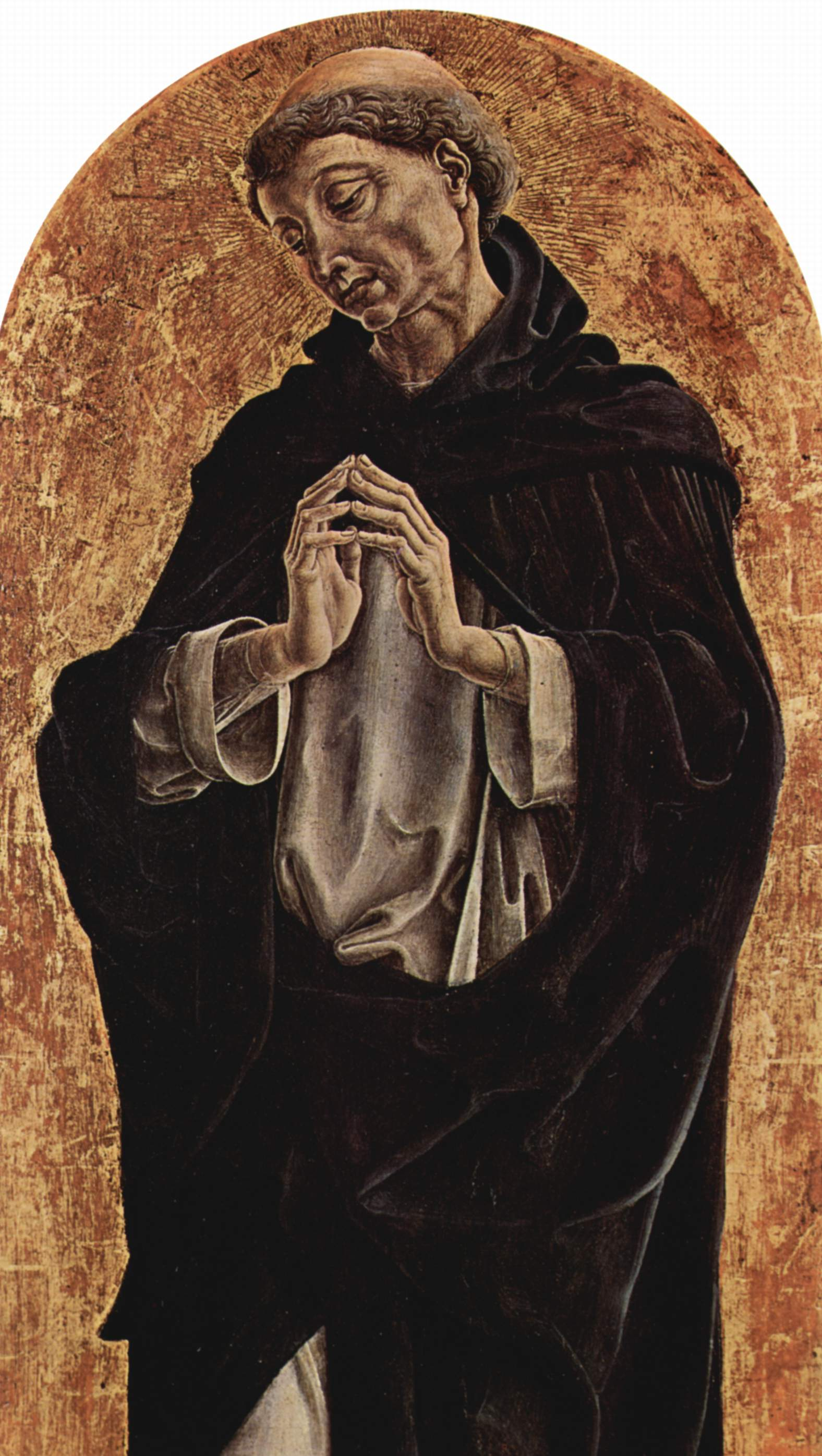
Saint Dominic (c. 1475) by Cosmè Tura

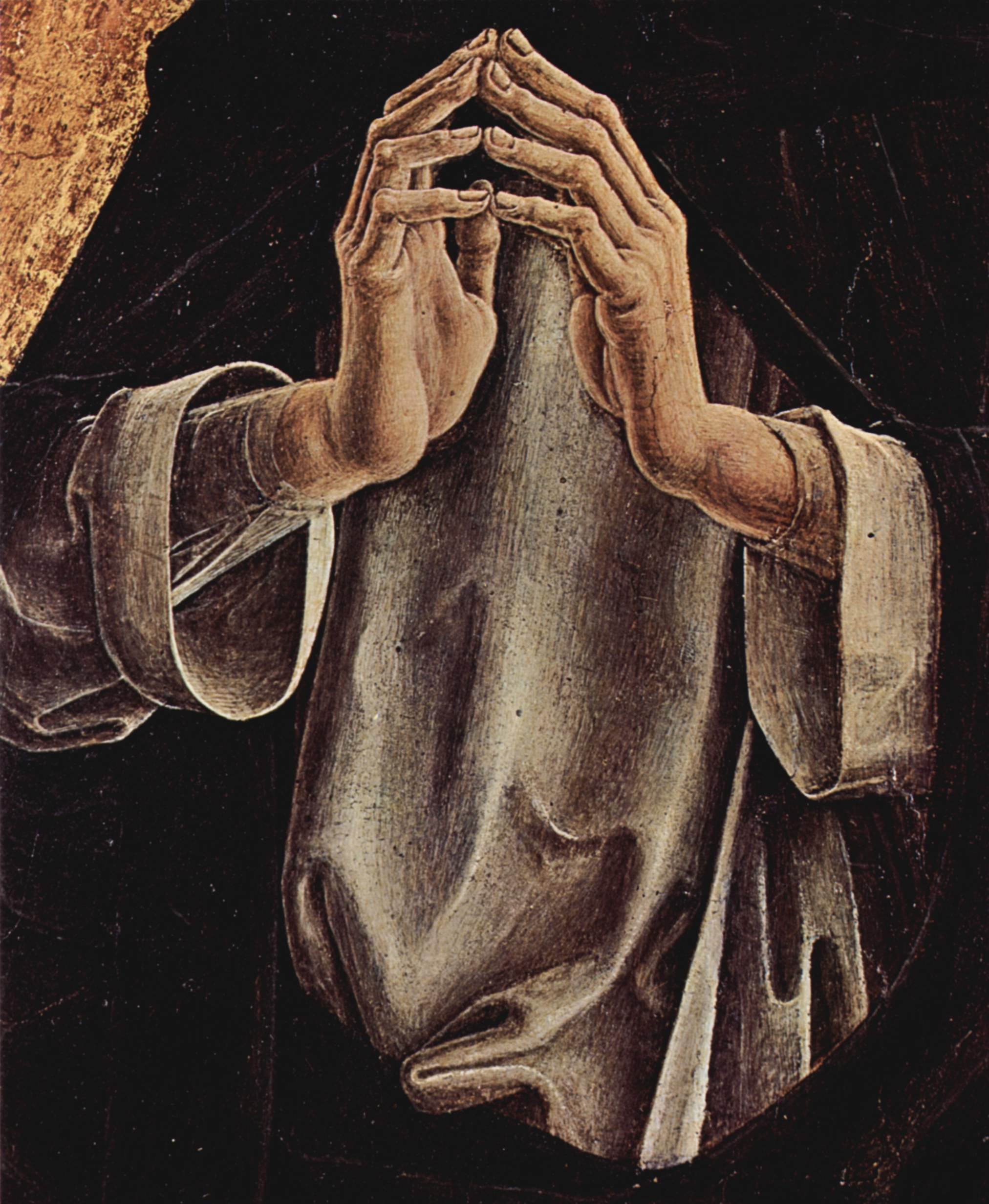
Detail

Saint Dominic is a painting in tempera and gold on panel of c. 1475 by Cosmè Tura, now in the Uffizi in Florence.

It originated in the Canonici collection in Ferrara, from which it was acquired by Professor Giuseppe Grassi in 1905. It forms part of a split-up altarpiece and relates to another five fragments of similar dimensions and style, which may have come from a single altarpiece or several. Most art historians assign the Saint Dominic to the San Giacomo in Argenta altarpiece (Mario Salmi, 1957; Nalajoli, 1974) or the San Luca in Borgo altarpiece in Ferrara (Roberto Longhi, 1934; Adolfo Venturi, 1914; and Ricci).

Emma Micheletti relates the work to the same artist's Saint Anthony of Padua in the Louvre and Saint James the Great Enthroned in the Musée des Beaux-Arts in Caen. Longhi also linked it to Saint Sebastian (Berlin), Saint Christopher (Berlin) and the Madonna in the collection of the Accademia Carrara in Bergamo, with the Berlin works forming side panels to the Bergamo panel. Monica Molteni (1999) decisively denied the links to the Berlin and Bergamo works, while Joseph Manca (2000) also raised doubts over such links, arguing that their supports did not match that of the Paris panel, the nearest in style to the Saint Dominic.

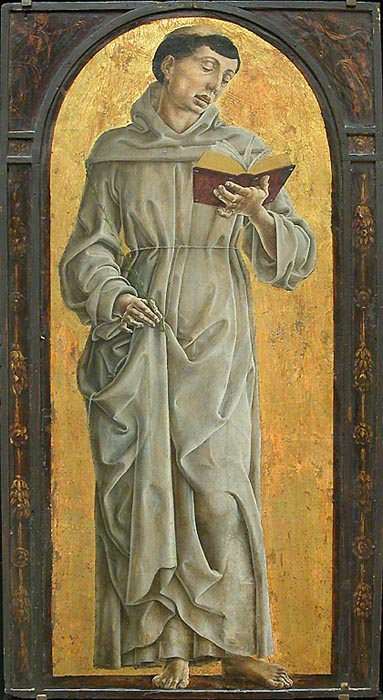
Saint Anthony of Padua, Louvre

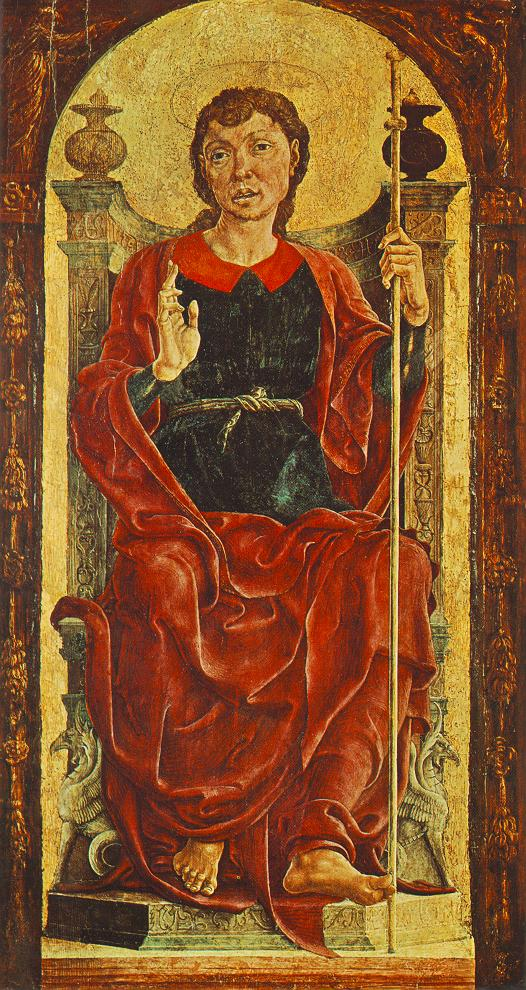
Saint James the Great Enthroned, Caen

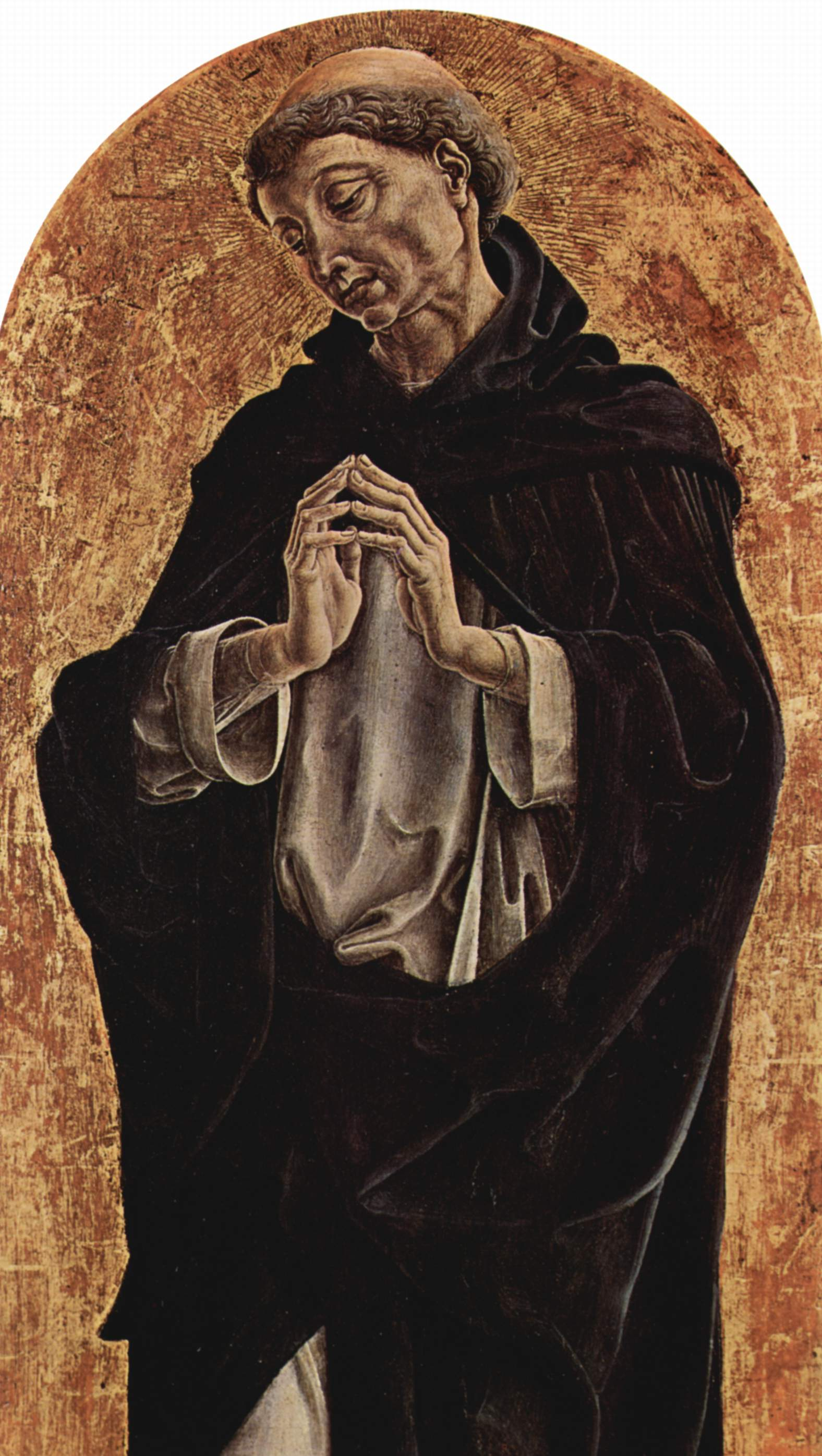
Saint Dominic

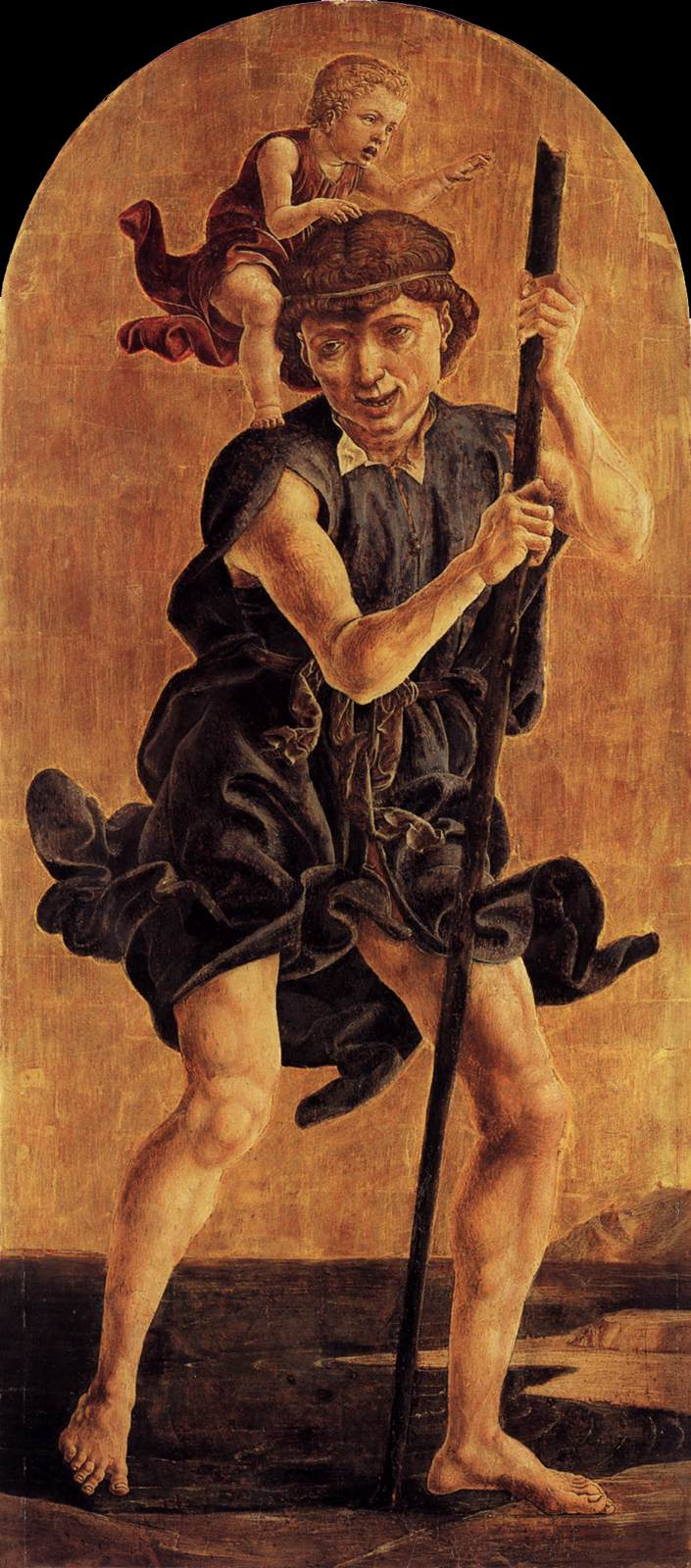
Saint Christopher, Berlin

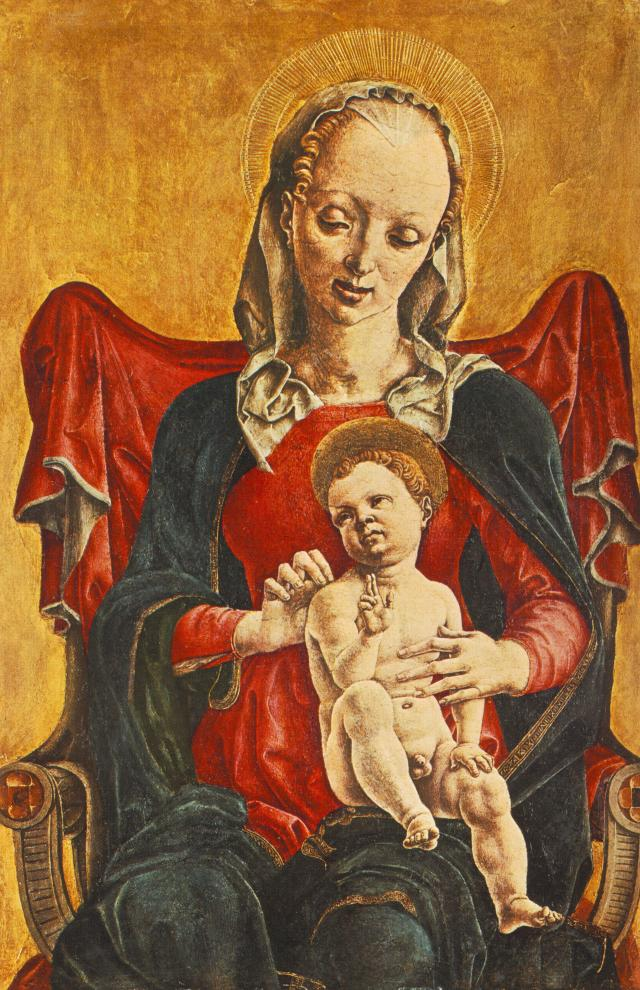
Madonna and Child, Bergamo

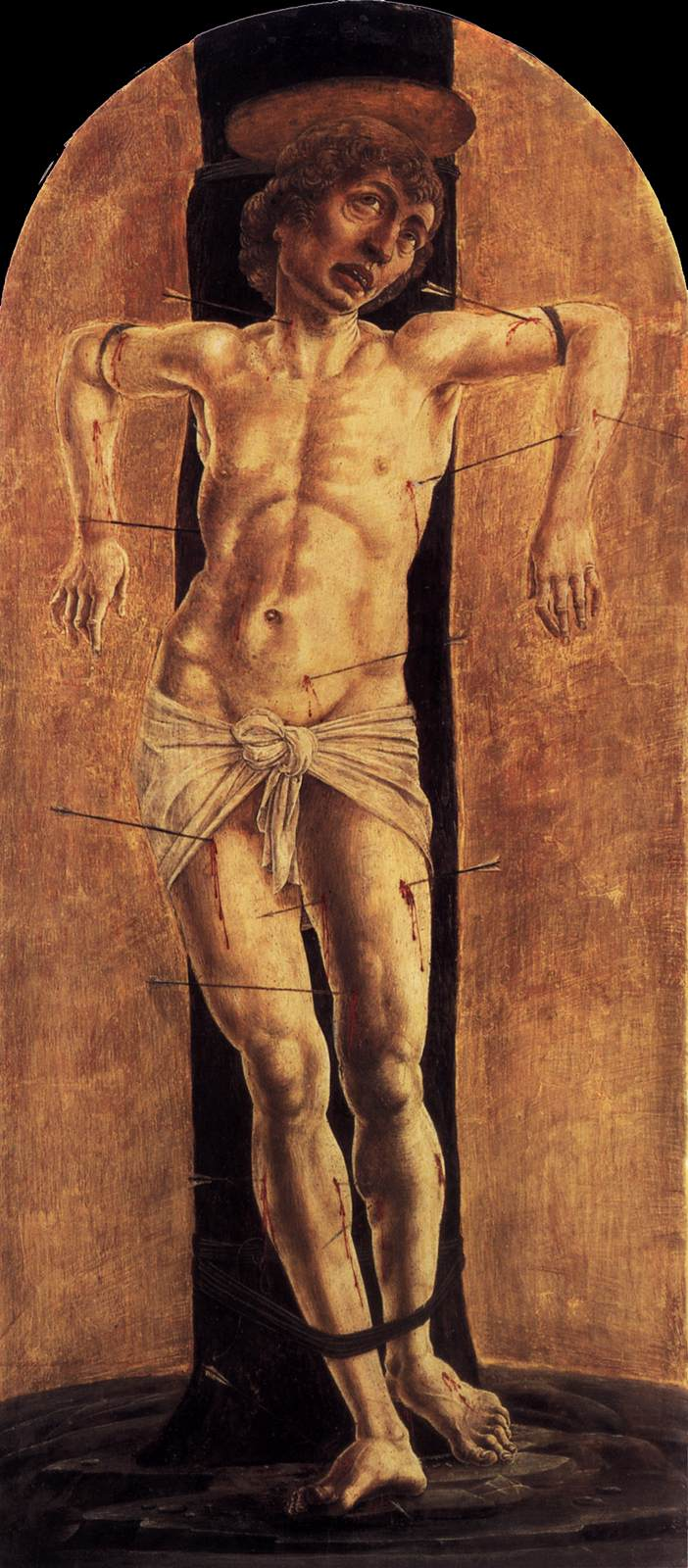
Saint Sebastian, Berlin
