= Ferrara Cathedral Organ Case =

Painting by Cosimo Tura

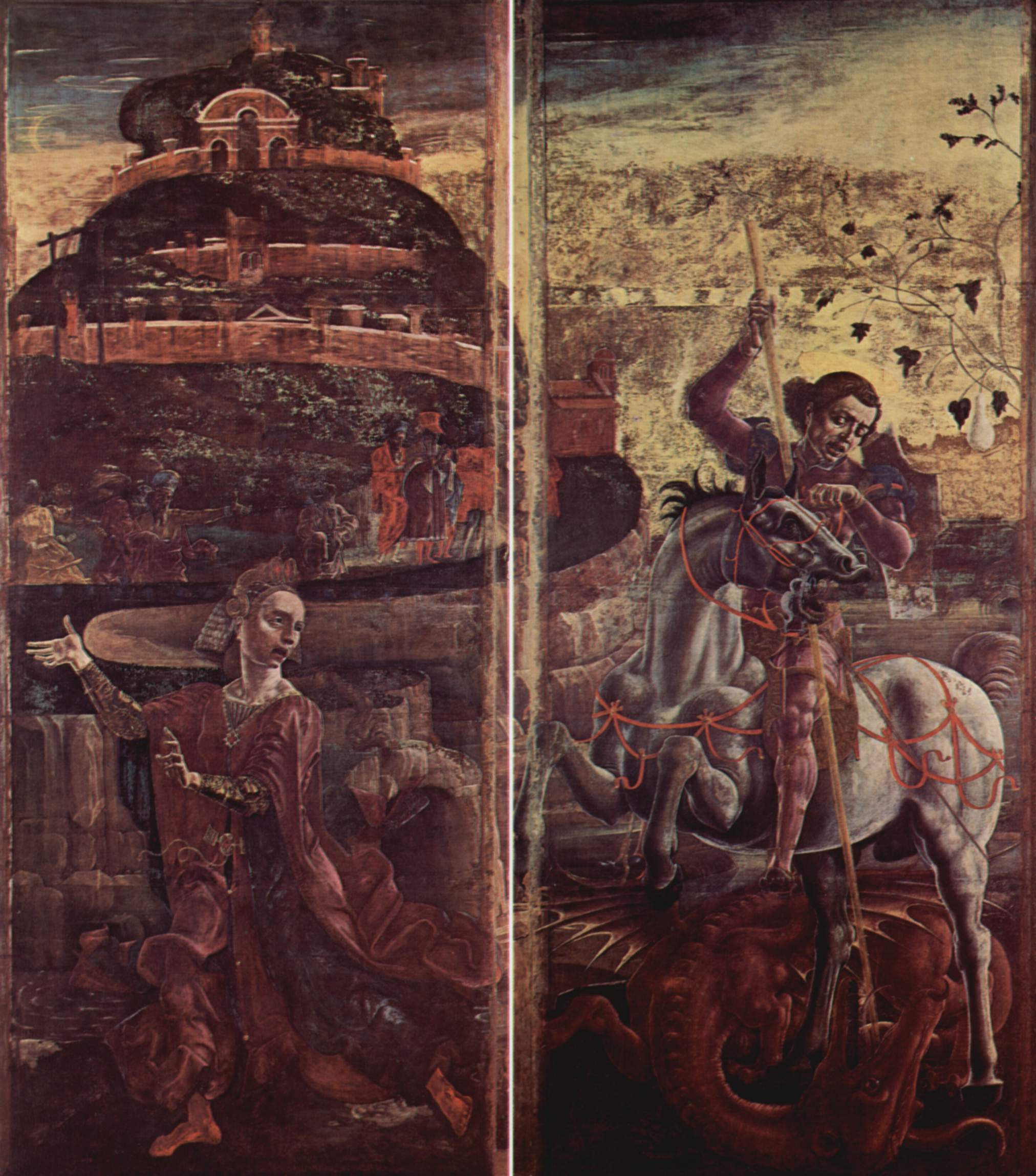
- St George and the Princess from the work
- Artist: Cosmè Tura
- Year: 1469
- Medium: tempera on canvas
- Dimensions: 349 cm × 152 cm (137 in × 60 in)
- Location: Cathedral Museum, Ferrara

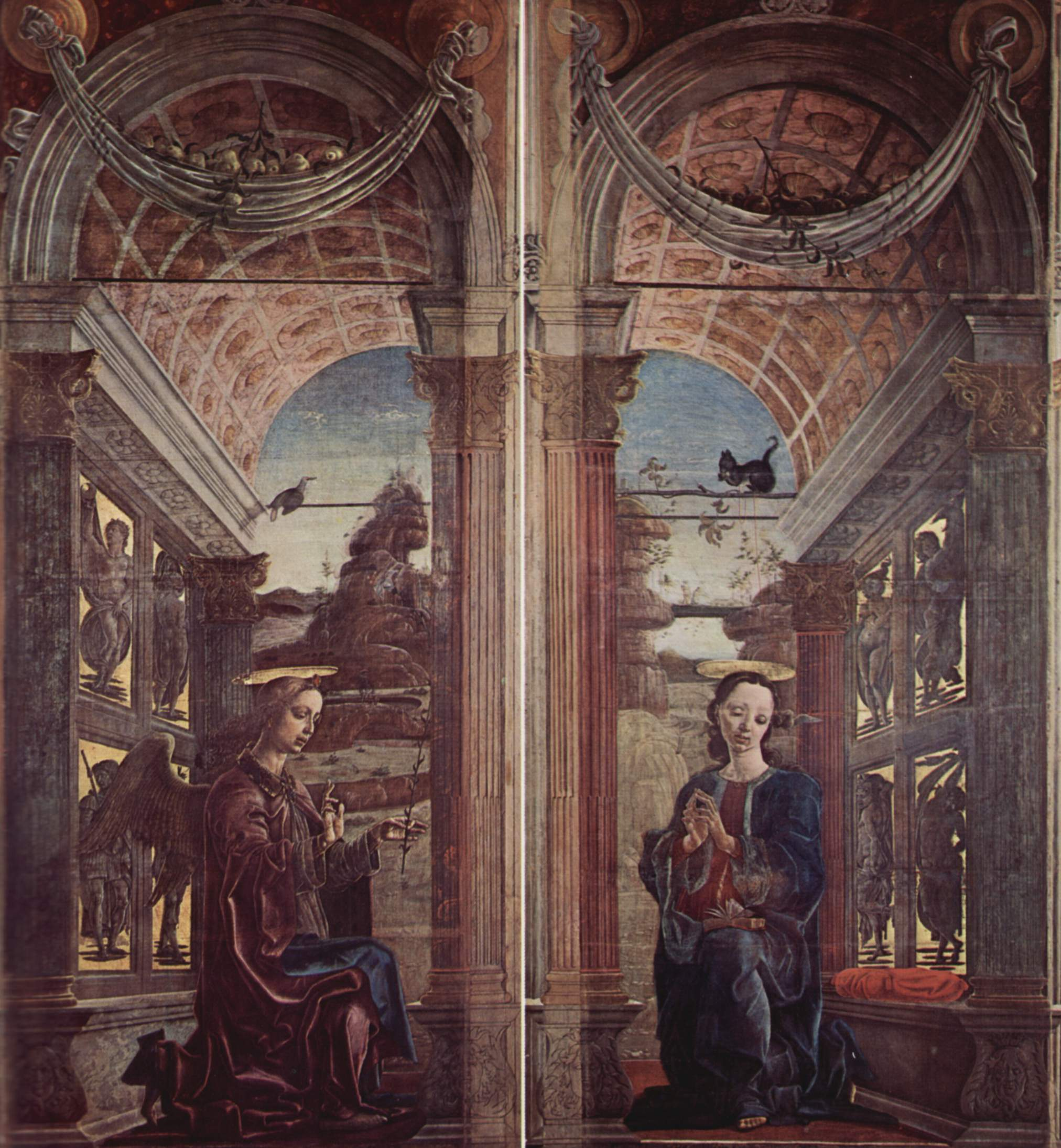
Annunciation

The Ferrara Cathedral Organ Case was a set of 1469 tempera on canvas paintings by Cosme Tura, originally forming doors for the organ at Ferrara Cathedral but now in the cathedral museum. Originally double-sided, the front and back of each door have now been separated. As originally constructed, the doors showed an annunciation scene when open and Saint George and the Princess when closed.

They are rare evidence of the artist's work after he was made court painter in 1456, both in terms of quality and as a fixed point in the chronology of the artist's oeuvre. He was paid for them on 2 June 1469, as shown by one of the few surviving documents relating to his artistic career. It shows influences from international Gothic (then prevalent at the court in Ferrara), Piero della Francesca, Mantegna and followers of Francesco Squarcione.
