= Saint Anthony of Padua (Tura) =

Painting by Cosmè Tura

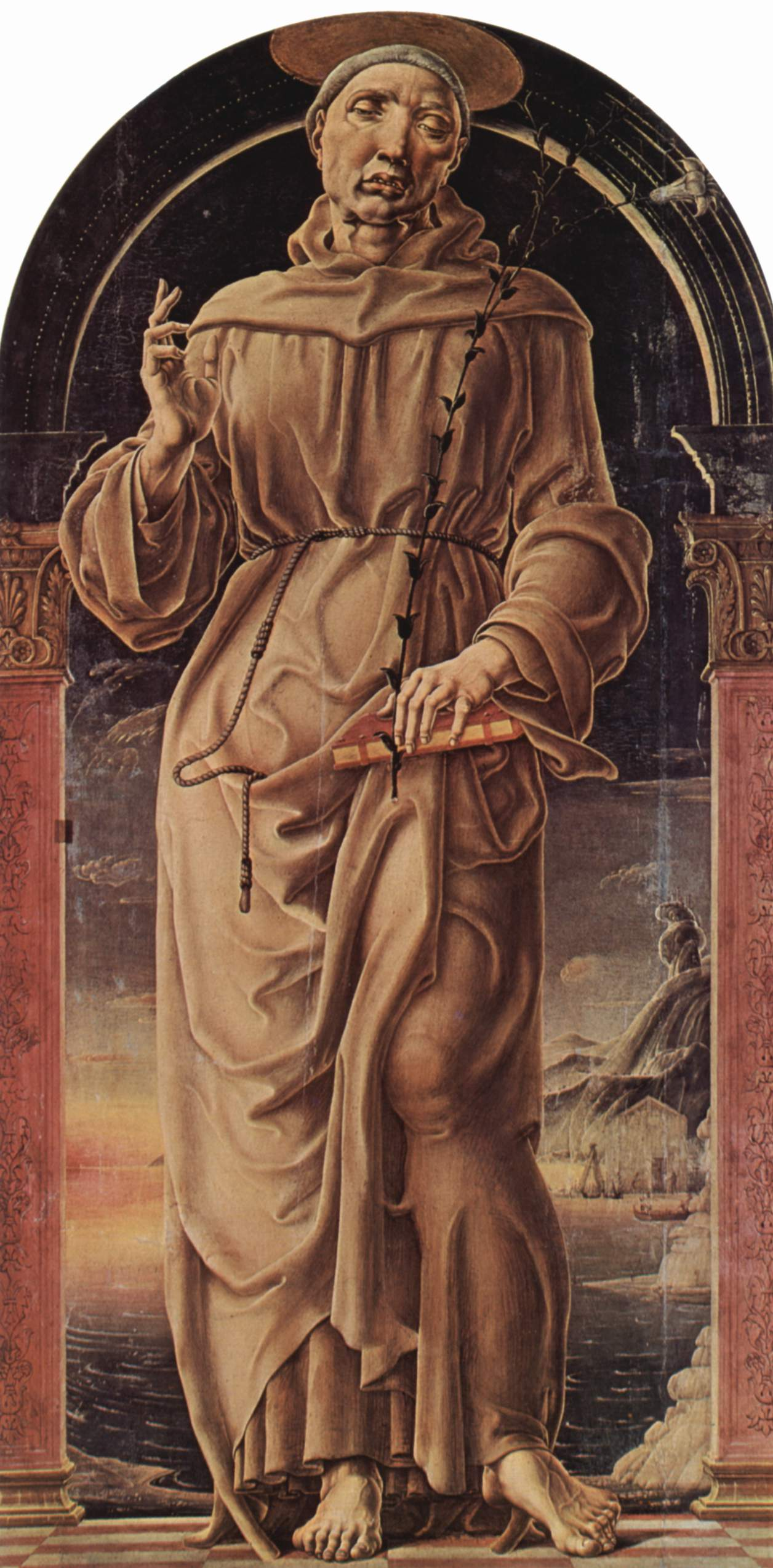
Saint Anthony of Padua (c. 1484–1490) by Cosmè Tura

Saint Anthony of Padua is an oil on panel painting by Cosmè Tura, executed c. 1484–1490, one of the artist's last works. It is held in the Galleria Estense in Modena.

== History ==
The work is mentioned in a 1490 letter from the artist to Ercole I d'Este, Duke of Ferrara, in which he asks for payment for it, stating "I do not know how to live and survive in this way, not finding work or opportunity to support my family and myself". The painting had been produced for Ercole's nephew Nicolò Gurone, soon to be bishop of Adria. Originally placed in the church of San Nicolò in Ferrara, it then passed through several institutions before being acquired by the Italian state for its current owner in 1906.

== Description ==
The painting shows the final developments of Tura's art, marked by a deep and original expressionism with flashes of visionary invention. The saint is represented very tall, with an emaciated and shocked face and in a reduced color scheme, which makes him look like a grotesque statue. The folds of his clothing are embossed by the incisive chiaroscuro as if they were made of stone, while some sharp lines, as in his hands, break the smooth course of the figure. The scene is set in a loggia with a checkerboard floor in perspective and an arch, supported by two Corinthian pillars with pulvinus, beyond which it opens a vast seascape with a lowered horizon, which makes the saint appear even higher. In the sea there are some inlets with boats, softly illuminated by the golden light of the sunset.
