= Ulderico Fabbri =

Italian sculptor

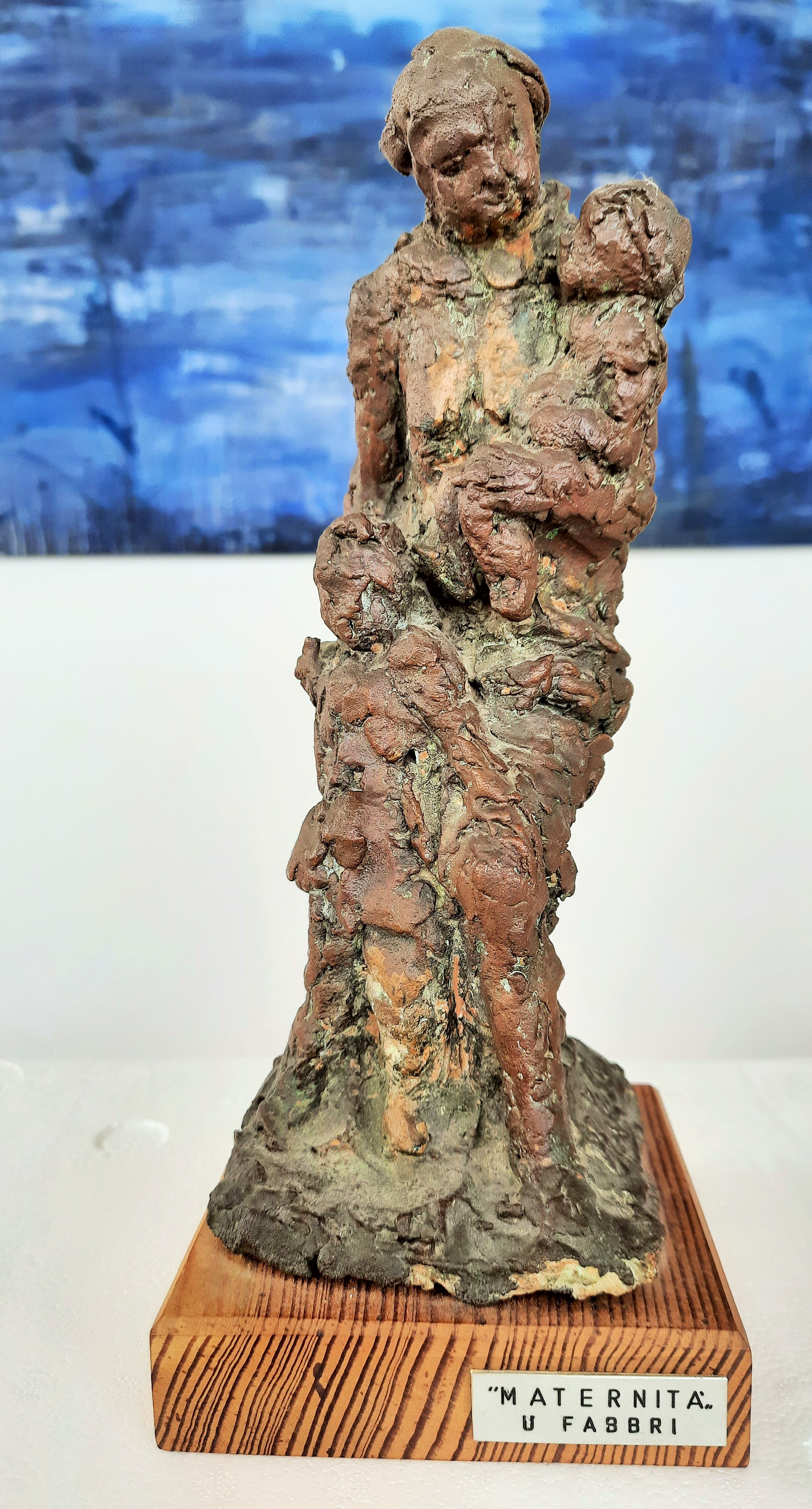
Ulderico Fabbri: Maternità,Alfredo Filippini Collection

Ulderico Fabbri (Ferrara, July 2, 1897 – Ferrara, August 16, 1970) was an Italian sculptor.

== Biography ==
He was born in Monestirolo, a hamlet of Ferrara, from the merchant Chiarissimo and Teresa Meotti. As a boy he worked at a marble cutter and attended evening classes at the "Dosso Dossi" art institute. Called to arms, he left for the Macedonian front and, hit by a grenade, returned with a severe atrophy in his left hand and a partial atrophy in the right. He obtained the pension of great invalid of war and in Rome, thanks to a slow and constant rehabilitation, he recovered almost completely the use of his hands. He studied at the Academy of Fine Arts in Rome.

He created male nudes with mutilated lower limbs: they are painful and symbolic sculptures, inspired by Antonio del Pollaiolo and neo-fourteenth-century art. Ulderico Fabbri was also influenced by Auguste Rodin and Medardo Rosso. His style sometimes tends to geometry, for example in the marble sculpture Hippogriff, exhibited in 1928 in Ferrara. In the sculpture Bimbo al telefono (Child on the Telephone), in artificial stone, created in 1930 and now in Modena at the Assicoop art collection, he mixes a modern element with the classical setting of the figure.

He was the author, in the early 1930s, of some of the marble busts placed in the Shrine of Fascist Martyrs (Paolo Accorsi, Franco Gozzi, Rino Moretti) placed in the then new headquarters of the Casa del Fascio, along with colleagues Giuseppe Virgili, Enzo Nenci, Antonio Alberghini, Laerte Milani and Gaetano Galvani. He sent his works to the International Exhibition of Sacred Art in Padua in 1931, to the Primaverile in Florence in 1933, to the Venice Biennale in 1936. In 1937 his sculpture Giovinetto is acquired by the Gallery of Modern Art in Milan. In 1938 he made the marble bust of Marshal Emilio De Bono of Italy, which was originally in Corte Delle Vittorie in Rome and is now in storage at the Casa Made Dei Mutilati in Rome. Other sculptures of his in Ferrara: the terracotta panels of the Via Crucis, in the Gran Claustro of the Church of San Cristoforo alla Certosa; Il Genio dell'arte, bronze sculpture on the facade of the Conservatorio Girolamo Frescobaldi (1930); the Fontana Narciso, in gilded bronze, at the Chamber of Commerce of Ferrara (1964); the neo-fourteenth-century Busto di Madonna, in terracotta, now owned by BPER (1946). The clay group of Ecce Homo (Ferrara, private collection) is originally resolved from the iconographic point of view, as well as Salvamento, terracotta of 1953, currently at the Cavallini-Sgarbi Foundation of Ro Ferrarese.

In 1954 Ulderico Fabbri sculpted in white marble the statue lying on the funeral monument of Archbishop Ruggero Bovelli, placed in 1955 in the Cathedral of Ferrara: a work on commission, in which the artist recovers all the academic tradition of Italian sculpture. A few years later he completed the realization of the altar of the Sacred Heart in the Cathedral of Milan, designed but left unfinished by Edoardo Rubino. The terracottas of his last years, which represent suffering figures, with half-closed eyes in the slit of the eyelids, oscillate between a recovered primitivism and the disintegration of the form on the example of Medardo Rosso.

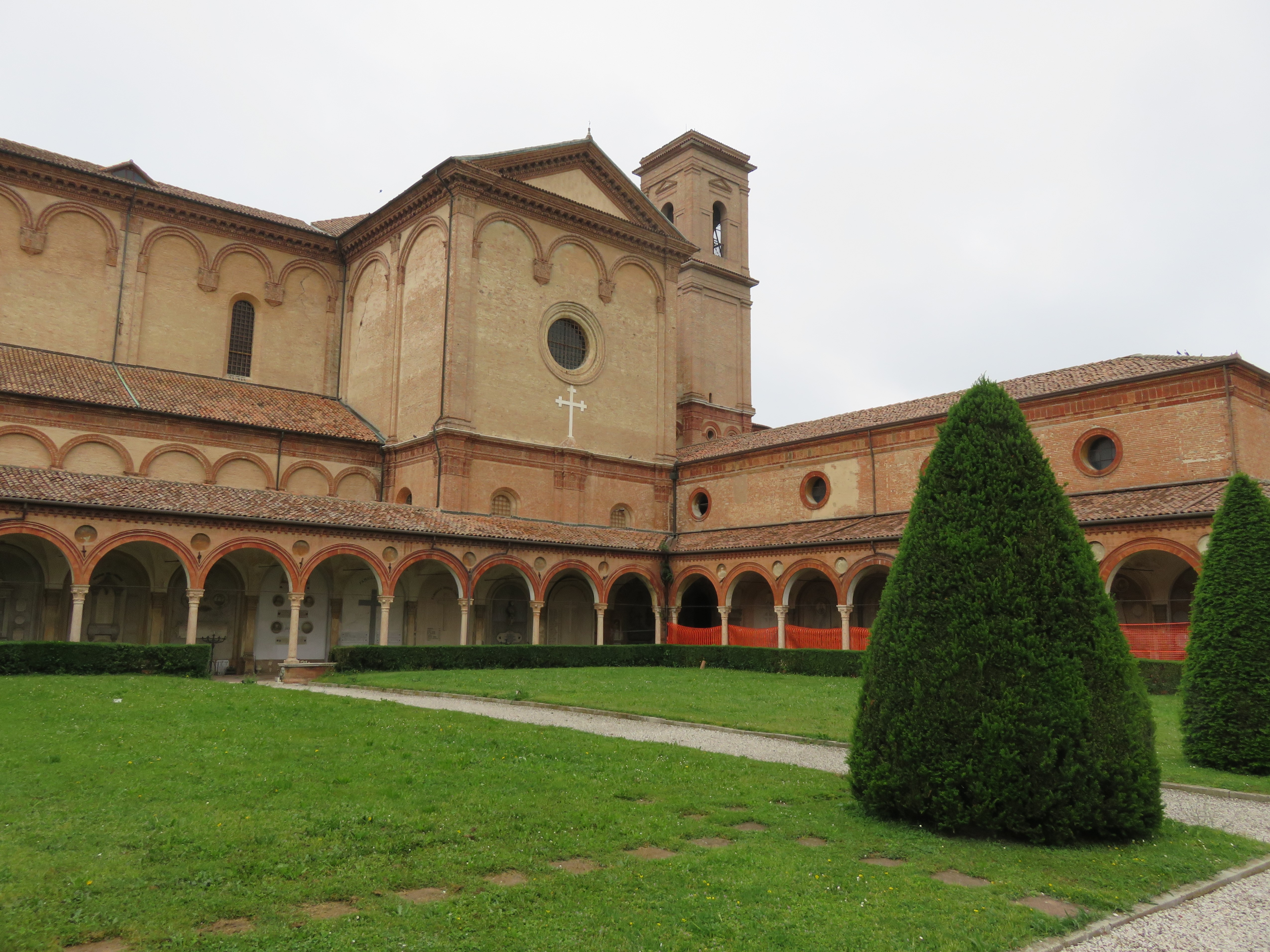
Great Claustro of the Certosa of Ferrara

Flavia Franceschini's documentary Ulderico Fabbri, a sculptor from Ferrara, also includes the film Al Filò, shot in 1953 by Florestano Vancini, which contains an interview with Ulderico Fabbri in the courtyard of his studio in Via Boccaleone in Ferrara, as well as interviews with Marcello Tassini, Ervardo Fioravanti, Giuseppe Virgili, Annibale Zucchini, Danilo Farinella, Nemesio Orsatti, and Galileo Cattabriga.

== Bibliografia ==
- Lucio Scardino, FABBRI, Ulderico, in Dizionario biografico degli italiani, vol. 43, Roma, Istituto dell'Enciclopedia Italiana, 1993. URL consultato il 30 gennaio 2021.
- Lucio Scardino (a cura di), Ulderico Fabbri (1897-1970): sculture ferraresi dagli anni '30 agli anni '50, Ferrara, Liberty house, 2015, SBN IT\ICCU\UFE\0994606.

== Voci correlate ==
- Lina Arpesani
- Evaristo Boncinelli
- Carlo Bonomi (artista)
- Gino Colognesi
- Oscar Gallo
- Lelio Gelli
- Valmore Gemignani
- Vitaliano Marchini
- Giorgio Sallustio Rossi
- Giuseppe Virgili
