= Circumcision of Christ (Guercino) =

Painting by Guercino

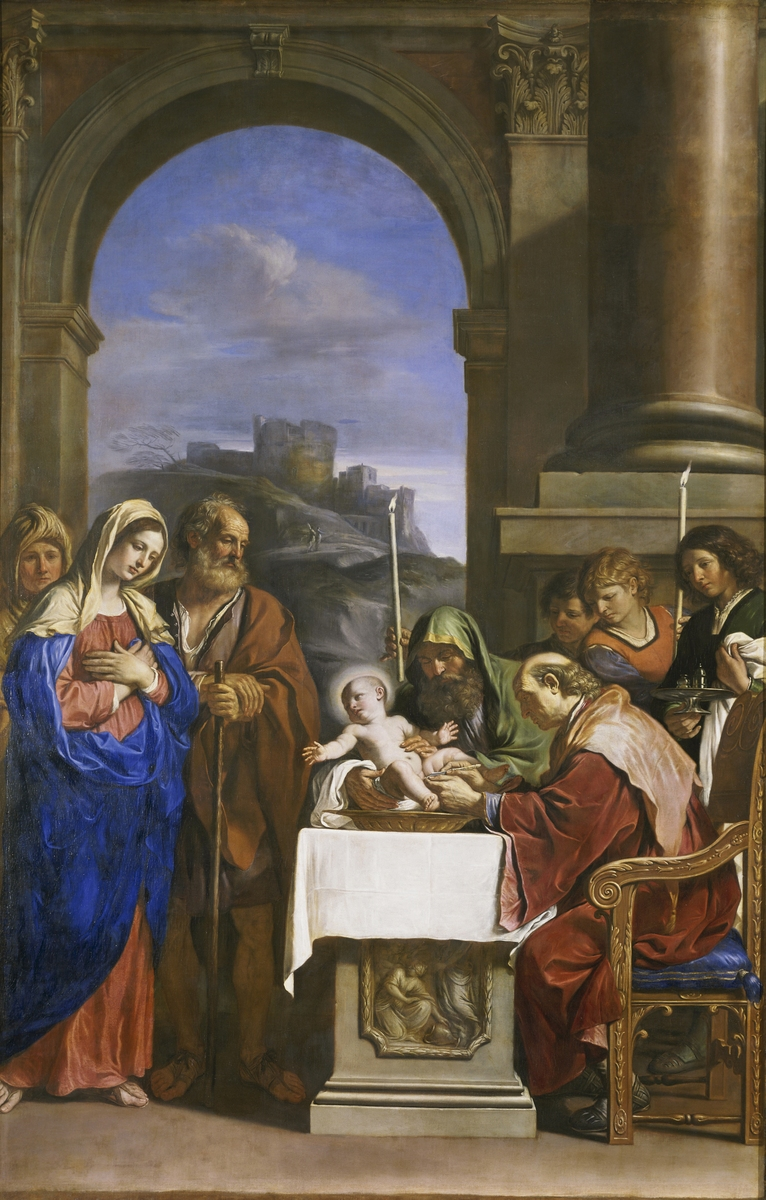
- Artist: Guercino
- Year: 1646
- Medium: Oil on canvas
- Dimensions: 415 cm × 265 cm (163 in × 104 in)
- Location: Musée des Beaux-Arts; Lyon

The Circumcision of Christ is a painting in oils on canvas executed in 1646 by the Italian artist Guercino. It depicts the Circumcision of Christ, and it was painted as the high altarpiece for a church in Bologna. It was originally surmounted by a semi-oval showing God the Father and the Holy Spirit; this is now in the Pinacoteca Nazionale di Bologna. Three pen and brown ink studies for the work survive, two in the Royal Collection and one in the Pinacoteca di Brera. There are also two drawings of the Virgin's clothing. The painting is now held in the Musée des Beaux-Arts de Lyon, where it has been since 1811.
