= Roverella Altarpiece =

Dismembered altarpiece by Cosimo Tura

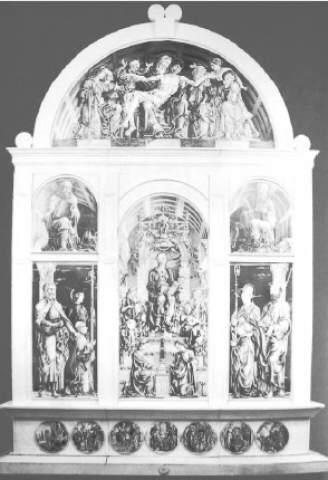
Reconstruction of the Roverella Altarpiece in his original form

The Roverella Altarpiece was a religious painting by Cosmè Tura completed during 1470–1474 using oil and egg tempera on poplar panel work, commissioned by abbot and cardinal Bartolomeo Roverella for San Giorgio fuori le mura in Ferrara in memory of his brother bishop Lorenzo Roverella. It was one of the most significant works of the artist and of the Ferrara Renaissance in general. It was damaged in an explosion in 1709 and moved out of the church. It is now dismembered and their panels split up between several museums.

== Description ==
An 18th-century description of the altarpiece was made by Girolamo Baruffaldi. Based on that information Maurizio Bonora created a reconstruction with the technique of graphite on paper.

The altarpiece was composed of six main panels, with a large Madonna and Child Enthroned in the center and on the sides two lower panels, with saints and characters of the Roverella family, surmounted by a panel with a kneeling saint each. Above was the large lunette with the Pietà, a work of great emotional force perhaps inspired by one of the numerous sculptural groups depicting the Lamentation over the Dead Christ then widespread in Romagna. At the bottom there was a predella made up of an unspecified number of roundels (perhaps seven), of which three are known today.

Of the side panels, only that of Saints Maurilius and Paolo with Niccolò Roverella is preserved, where we can see, in the drapery of Paolo's cloak, the typical Tura style in rendering the folds as if they were heavy and wet, with a strong chiaroscuro. On the whole, the perspective glimpses with a lowered vanishing point must have been remarkable, which allowed to see the lacunar vaults of the architectural backgrounds, as is clearly evident in the central panel.

The known panels from the altarpiece are:

- Pietà with Saints, 132x267 cm, Louvre, Paris - upper lunette
- St George, 39x29 cm, San Diego Museum of Art, San Diego - main register, left, main panel (fragment)
- Madonna and Child Enthroned, 239x102 cm, National Gallery, London - main register, centre
- Saint Maurilius and Saint Paul with Niccolò Roverella, Galleria Colonna, Rome - main register, right, main panel
- Circumcision of Christ, tondo, 38 cm (diameter), Isabella Stewart Gardner Museum, Boston - predella
- Flight into Egypt, tondo, 38 cm (diameter), Metropolitan Museum of Art, New York - predella
- Adoration of the Magi, tondo, 38 cm (diameter), Fogg Art Museum, Cambridge (Massachusetts) - predella

In the lower left panel were to be the Saints Lawrence and George (fragment of San Diego, possibly damaged by the explosion of 1709), with Bishop Lorenzo knocking on the door of Heaven. Saints Bernard and Benedict were also to be represented in the panels, according to Girolamo Baruffaldi.

== Gallery ==
=== Lunette ===
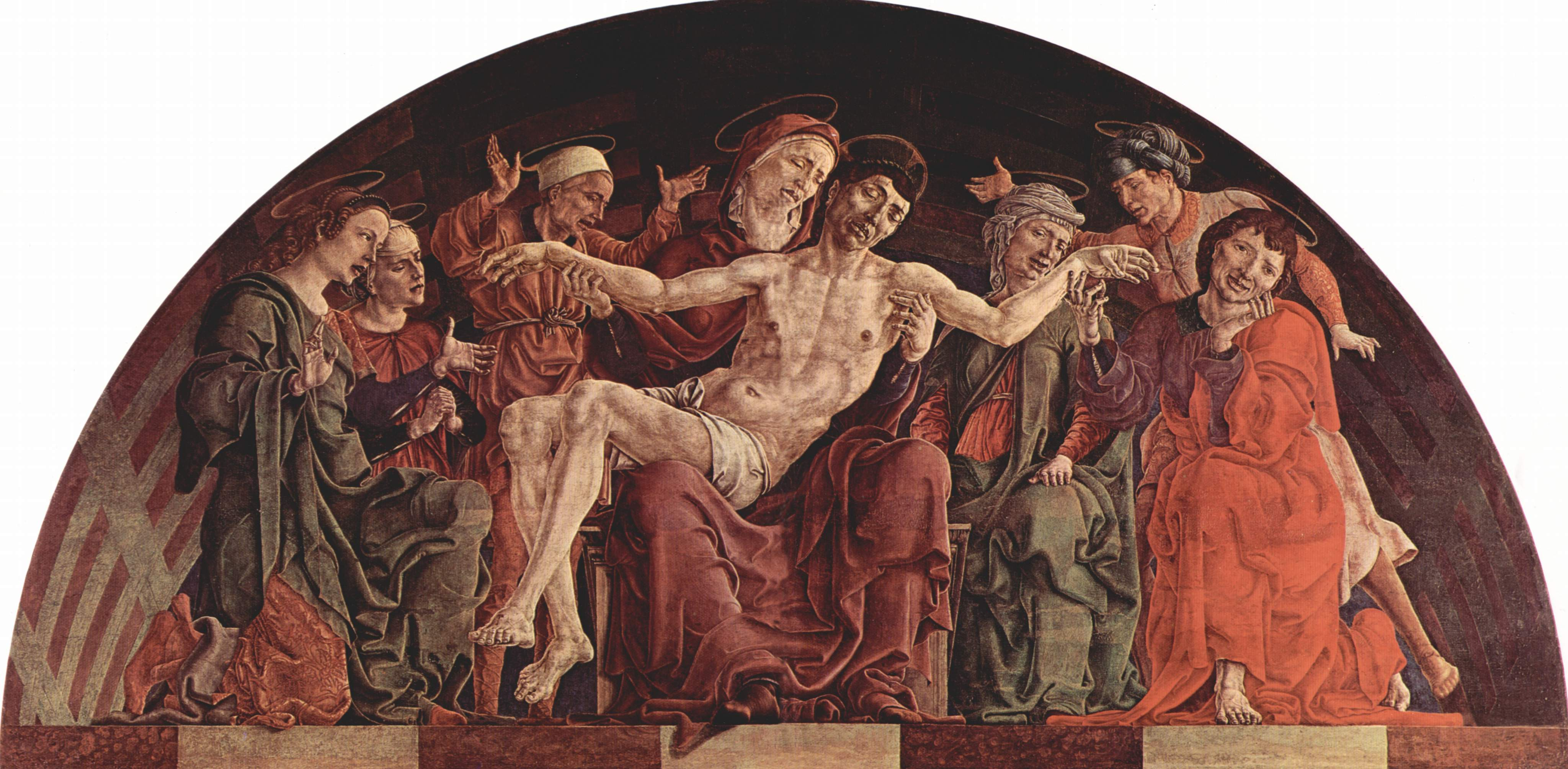
Pietà

=== Main register ===
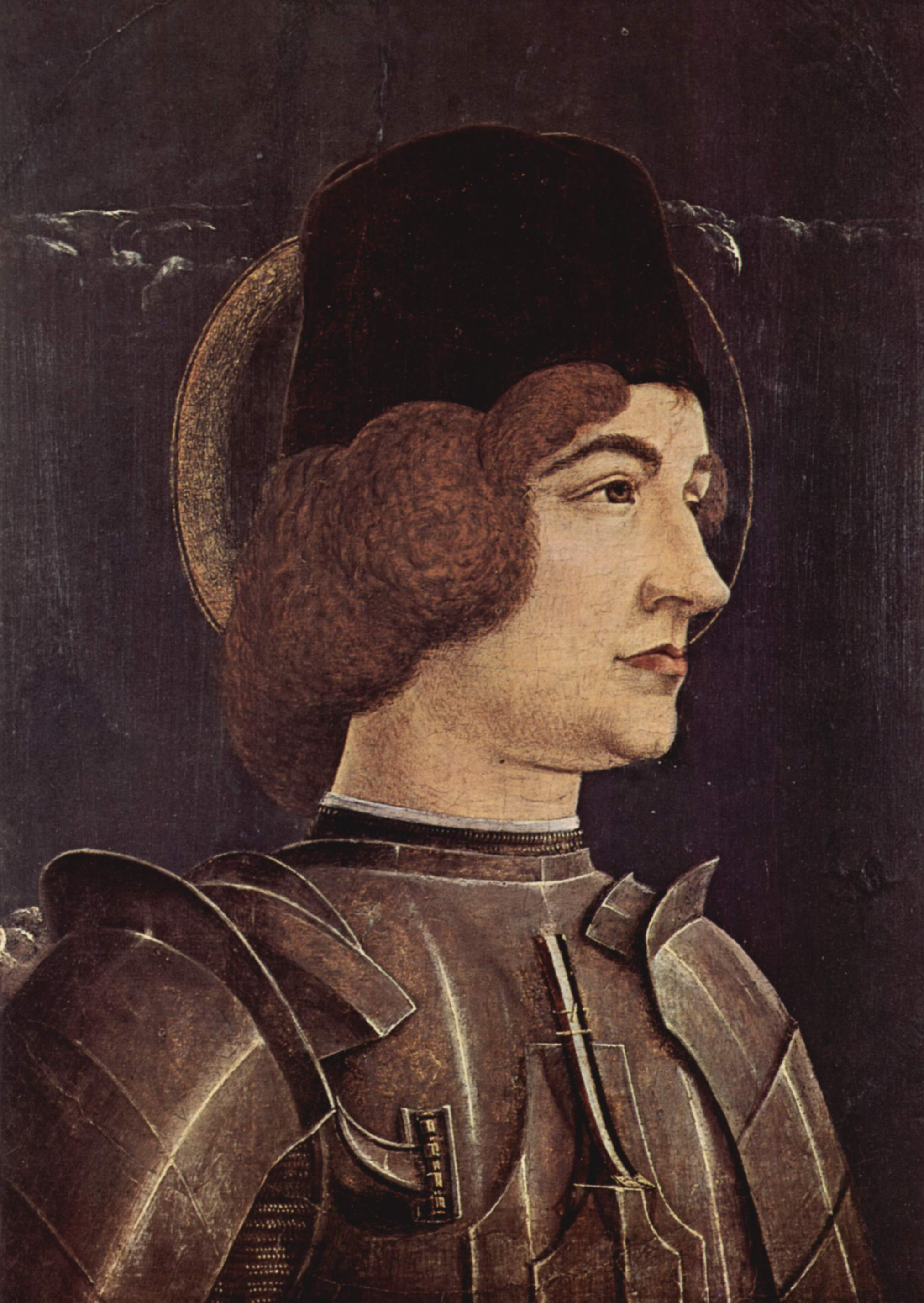
Saint George (part of main left panel)

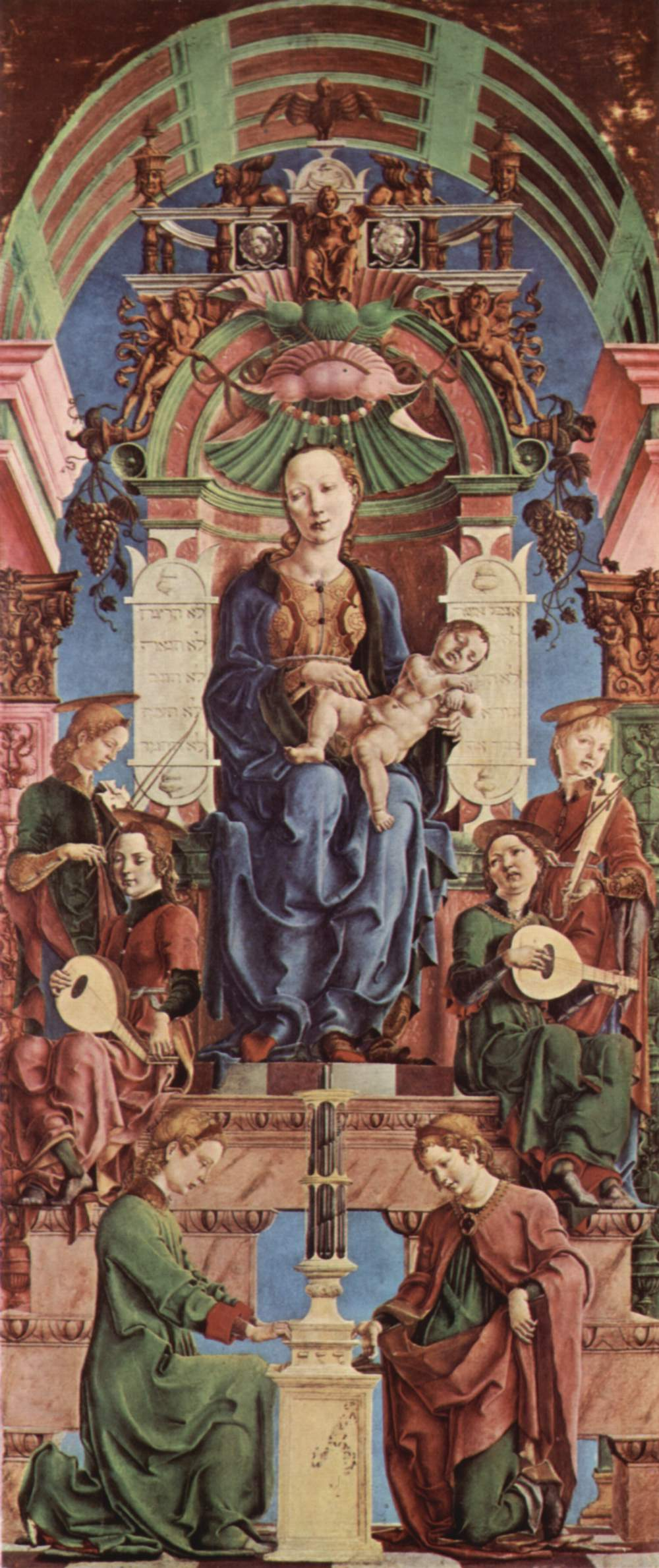
Madonna and Child Enthroned (central panel, double height)

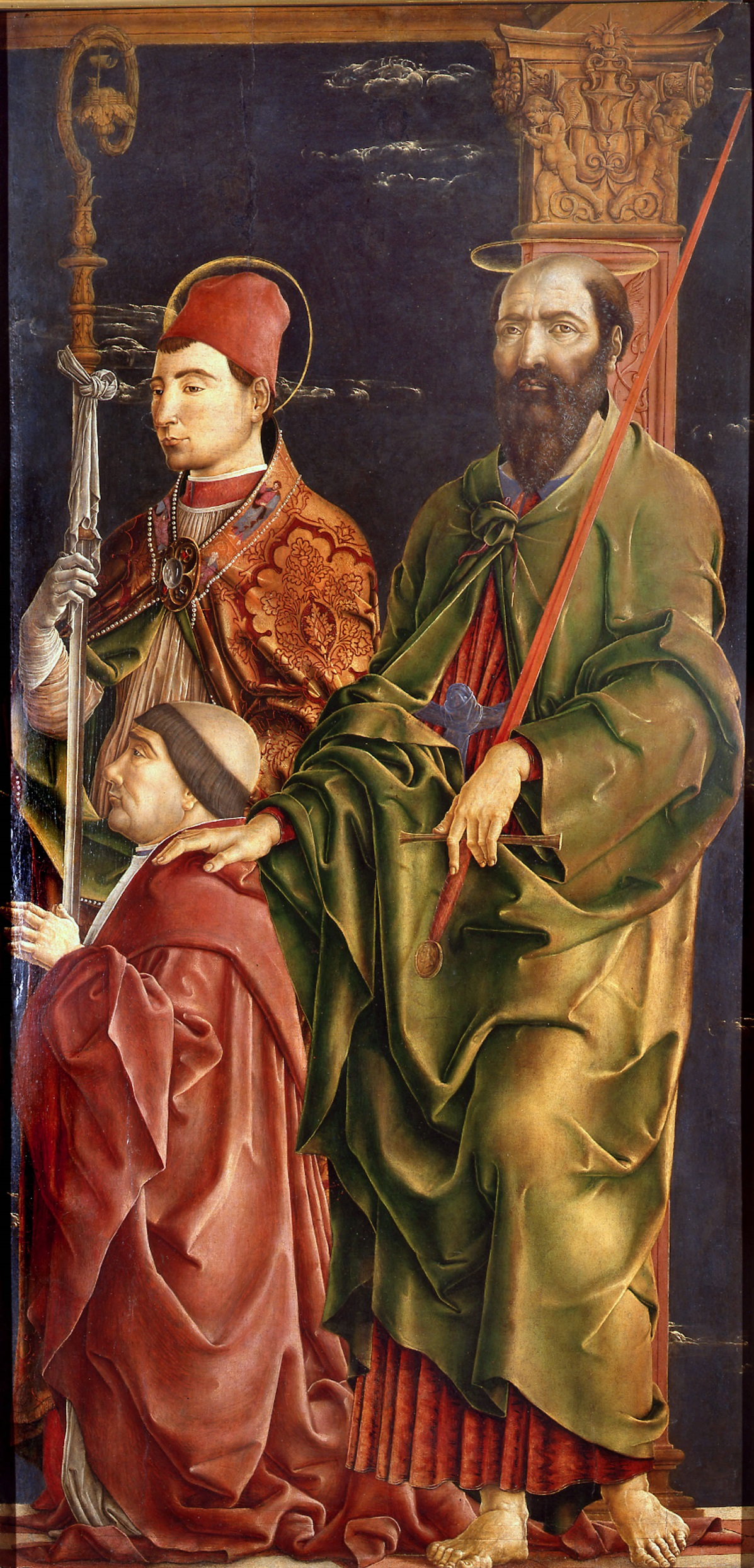
Saint Maurelius and Saint Paul with Niccolò Roverella (main right panel)

=== Predella ===
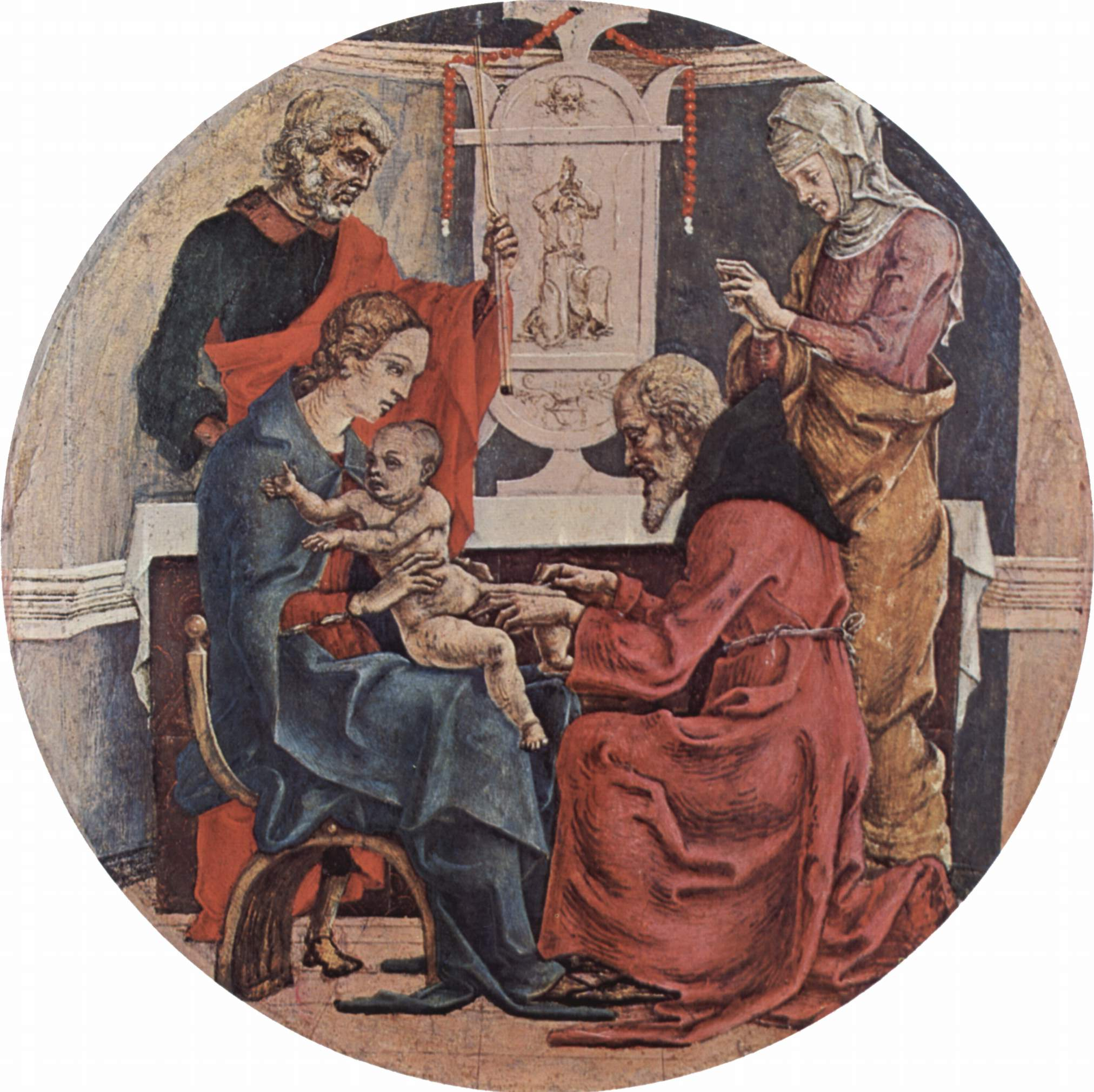
Circumcision

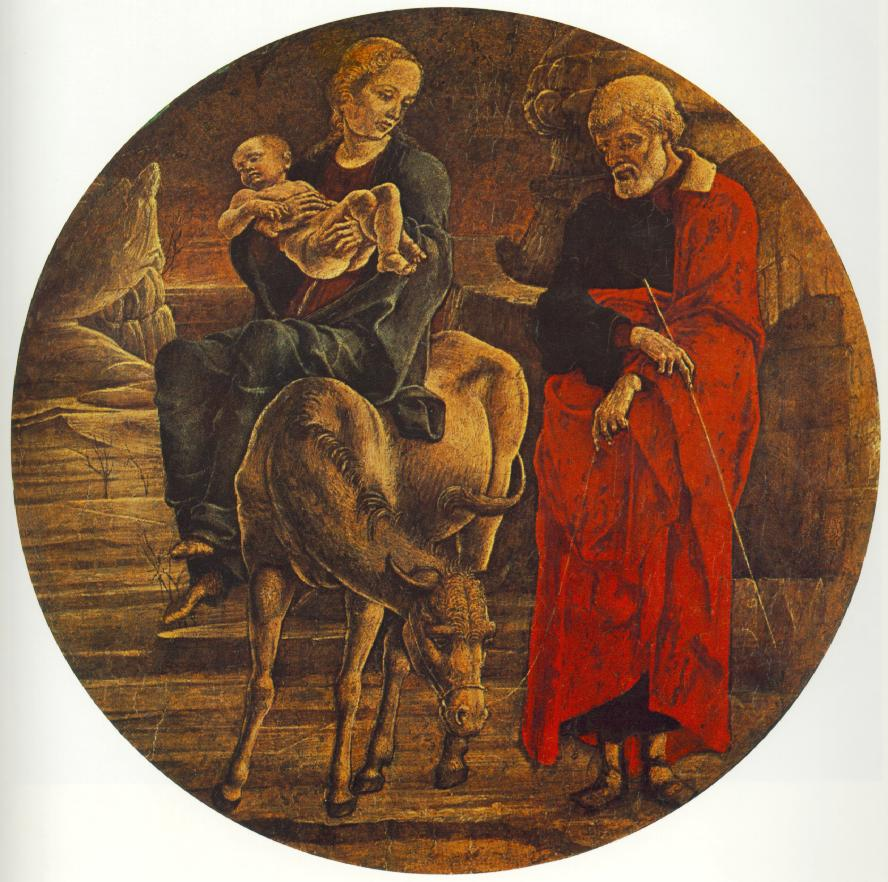
Flight into Egypt
