= Delizia di Belriguardo =

Coordinates: 44.7536°N 11.7569°E

Delightful Palace of Belriguardo
- Delizia di Belriguardo
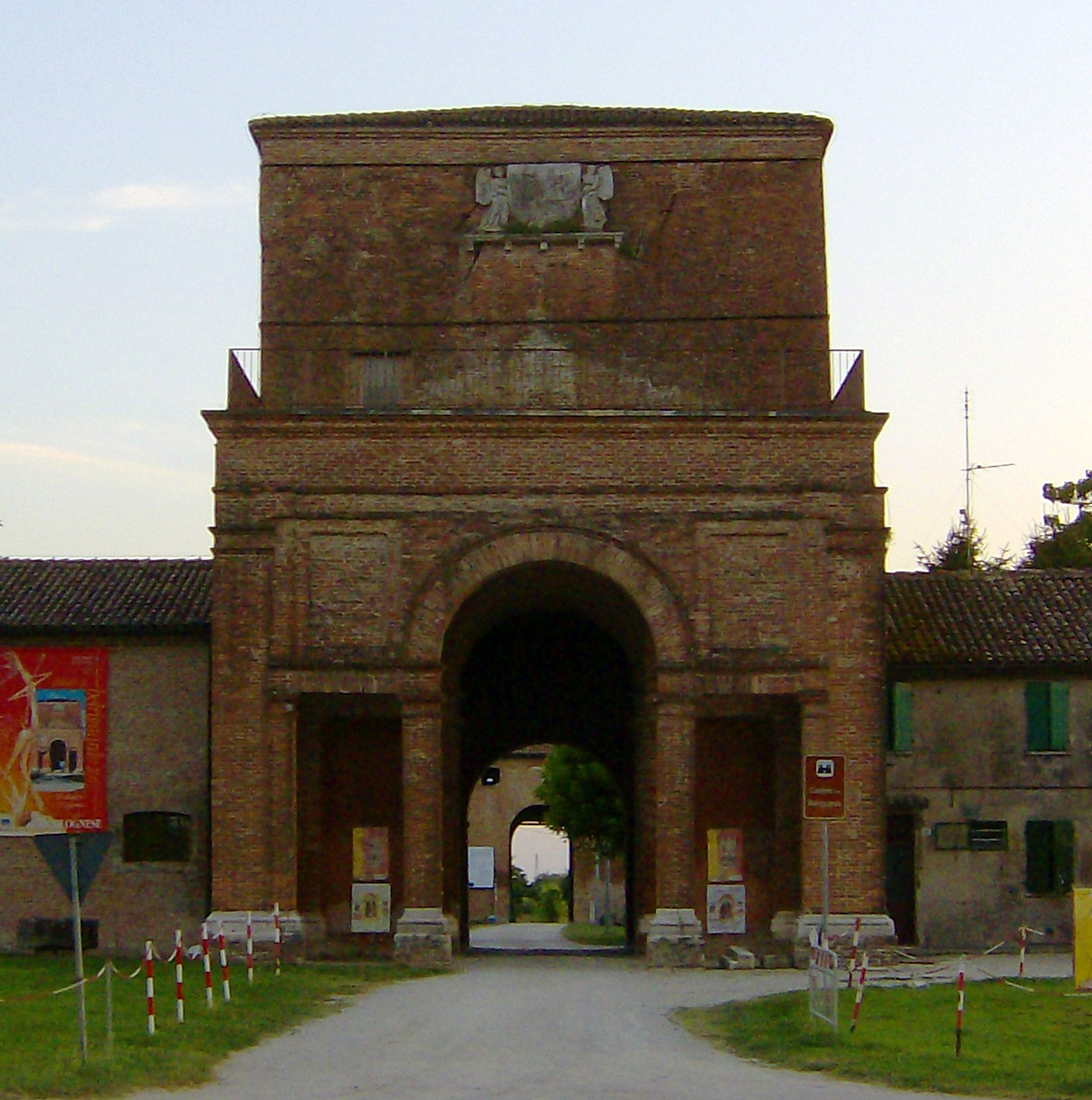
- Entrance
- Interactive map of the Delightful Palace of Belriguardo area

General information
- Type: Palazzo
- Location: Via Provinciale, 274, Voghiera, Italy
- Owner: House of Este
- Landlord: Niccolò III d'Este

Delightful Palace of Belriguardo or Delightful Villa of Belriguardo (Italian: Delizia di Belriguardo) is the headquarters of the Museo civico di Belriguardo. It was built by Niccolò III d'Este. Lucrezia Borgia stayed here frequently.

At the end of the 15th century, Sabadino degli Arienti wrote a description of the palazzo. In 1493, Ludovico il Moro wrote a letter to Beatrice d'Este saying:

...Non voria per cosa del mondo esser manchato de venire perché ho veduto tanto grande casa, tanto bella et bene intesa et cussì ornata de picture excellentissime, che non credo ch’el mondo abia una simile...
