= Voghiera =

- Comune
- Comune di Voghiera
- Coat of arms

- Voghiera within the Province of Ferrara

- Location within Italy Location within Emilia-Romagna
- Coordinates: 44°46′N 11°45′E
- Country: Italy
- Region: Emilia-Romagna
- Province: Province of Ferrara (FE)
- Frazioni: Ducentola, Gualdo, Montesanto, Voghenza

Area
  - Total: 40.5 km^{2} (15.6 sq mi)
- Elevation: 7 m (23 ft)

Population (Dec. 2004)
  - Total: 3,924
  - Density: 96.9/km^{2} (251/sq mi)
- Demonym: Voghieresi
- Time zone: UTC+1 (CET)
  - Summer (DST): UTC+2 (CEST)
- Postal code: 44019
- Dialing code: 0532
- Website: Official website

Voghiera (Ferrarese: Vughièra) is a comune (municipality) in the Province of Ferrara in the northeastern Italian region Emilia-Romagna, located about 45 kilometres (28 mi) northeast of Bologna and about 13 kilometres (8 mi) southeast of Ferrara.

As of 31 December 2004, it had a population of 3,924 and an area of 40.5 square kilometres (15.6 mi^{2}).

Remarkable the Delizia di Belriguardo, a House of Este residence.

== Geography ==
The municipality of Voghiera contains the frazioni (subdivisions, mainly villages and hamlets) Ducentola, Gualdo, Montesanto and Voghenza (a former bishopric).

Voghiera borders the following municipalities: Argenta, Ferrara, Masi Torello and Portomaggiore.

== Ecclesiastical history ==
Of these, Voghenza (in Latin, Vicohabentia) was once a residential bishopric, believed to have been renamed, due to a see shift, in 950 as Diocese of Ferrara (now Metropolitan Archdiocese of Ferrara–Comacchio). See also: Maurelius of Voghenza

=== Titular see ===
It is now included in the Catholic Church's list of titular sees.

In 1966, the diocese was nominally restored as Latin Titular bishopric of Voghenza (Curiate Italian) or Vicohabentia in Latin, adjective Vicohabentin(us).

It has had the following incumbents, of the fitting Episcopal (lowest) rank, with an archiepiscopal promotion in this title as exception:

- Angelo Scapecchi (1967.07.11 – 1996.03.20), first as Auxiliary Bishop of Cortona (Italy) (1967.07.11 – 1986.09.30), then restyled as Auxiliary Bishop of successor see Arezzo–Cortona–Sansepolcro (1986.09.30 – retired 1987.07.25); died 1996
- Salvatore Fisichella (Rino) (1998.07.03 – 2008.06.17 see below) as Auxiliary Bishop of the papal Vicariate of Rome (Roma, Italy) (1998.07.03 – 2008.06.17), also President of Pontifical Institute of John Paul II for Studies on Marriage and Family (2002.01.18 – 2006.01), Rector Magnificus of Pontifical Lateran University (2002.01.18 – 2010.06.30), President of Pontifical Academy for Life (2008.06.17 – 2010.06.30)
- the same Salvatore Fisichella (Rino), promoted Titular Archbishop of Voghenza (see above 2008.06.17 – ...), also President of Pontifical Council for the Promotion of the New Evangelization (2010.06.30 – ...) and President of International Council for Catechesis (2013.01.16 – ...)

== Demographic evolution ==
Historical population

Year	Pop.	±%
1861	3,139	—
1871	3,374	+7.5%
1881	3,593	+6.5%
1901	4,160	+15.8%
1911	4,269	+2.6%

Year	Pop.	±%
1921	4,696	+10.0%
1931	4,834	+2.9%
1936	4,926	+1.9%
1951	5,497	+11.6%
1961	4,833	−12.1%

Year	Pop.	±%
1971	4,286	−11.3%
1981	4,077	−4.9%
1991	4,088	+0.3%
2001	3,945	−3.5%

Source: Data from ISTAT

== Sources and external links ==
Media related to Voghiera at Wikimedia Commons

- (in Italian)www.comune.voghiera.fe.it/
- GCatholic - Voghenza
- GCatholic - Ferrara-Commachio
