= San Giorgio fuori le mura =

Church in Ferrara, Italy

Coordinates: 44°49′17.97″N 11°37′40.89″E

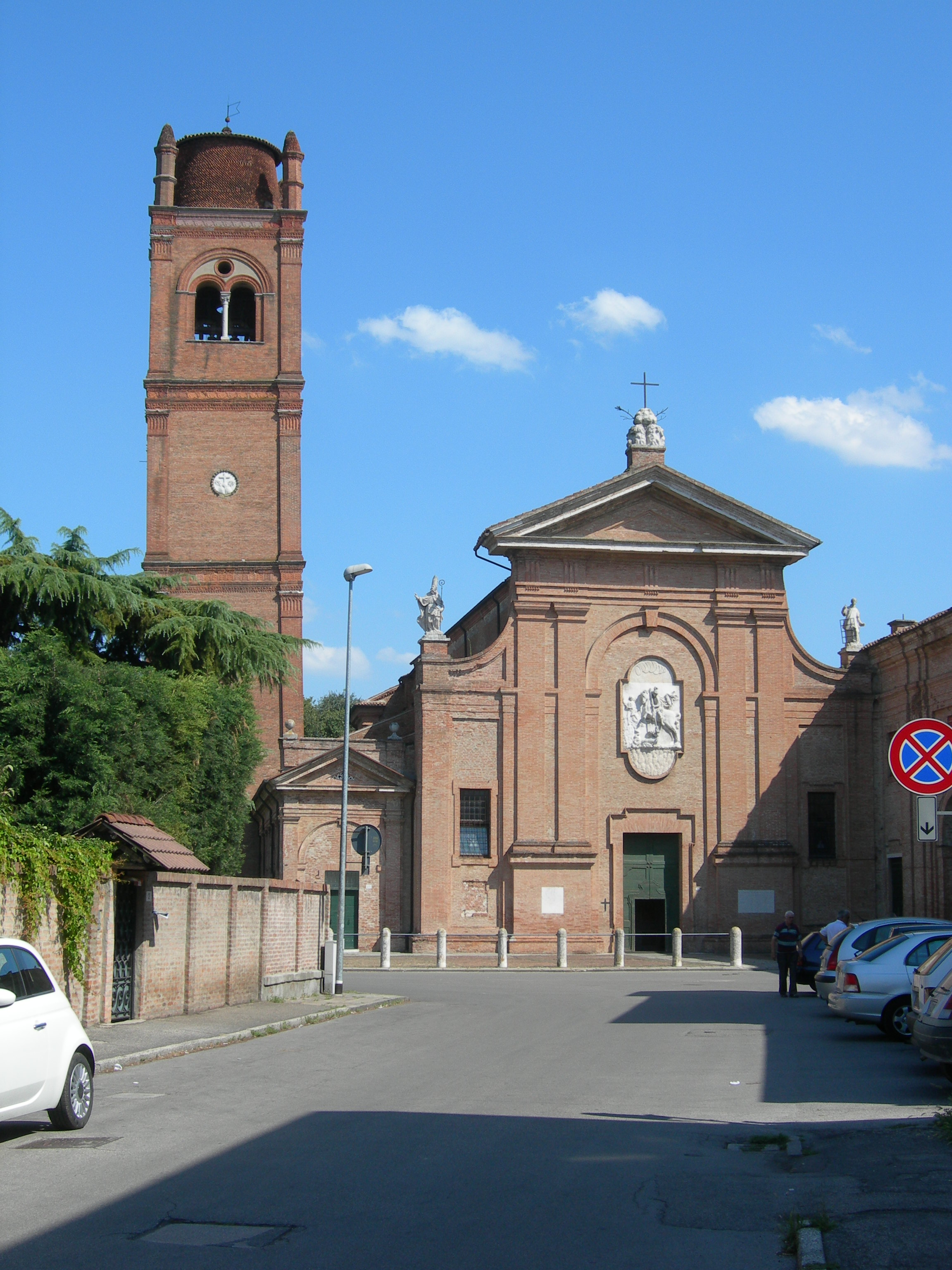
Saint George's Basilica, Ferrara

Saint George's Basilica is a Roman Catholic church in Ferrara, Italy. It is called San Giorgio fuori le mura in Italian, meaning Saint George's "outside the walls" because it was built outside the city walls, while Saint George's Cathedral was within the city walls. It is the oldest church in the city.

== History ==
The history of the Basilica is closely linked with the origins of Ferrara. Between the seventh and eighth centuries, due to continual barbarian invasion that devastated Voghiera, the bishopric was moved from Voghiera and the location near the Po river became the first settlement for the town of Ferrara. Soon the town of Ferrara grew larger on the other bank of the Po river and in 1135 the bishop's seat was moved to the Cathedral of Ferrara in the center of the city.

The Basilica was completely rebuilt in the fifteenth century by Biagio Rossetti, and in 1581 by Alberto Schiatti and further modified in the seventeenth and eighteenth centuries. The Basilica still stands today.
