= Renzo Ravenna =

Italian politician (1893–1961)

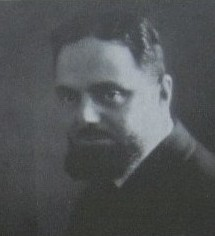

Mayor of Ferrara
- In office December 16, 1926 – March 17, 1938
- Prime Minister: Benito Mussolini
- Preceded by: Raoul Caretti
- Succeeded by: Alberto Verdi

Personal details
- Party: National Fascist Party
- Education: University of Ferrara
- Profession: Lawyer

Renzo Ravenna (Ferrara, August 20, 1893 – Ferrara, October 29, 1961) was an Italian lawyer and politician. He belonged to a prominent Jewish family in Ferrara and was, with Enrico Paolo Salem in Trieste, one of only two Fascist mayors of Jewish origin in Italy before the introduction of the racial laws.

He was an interventionist and volunteer during World War I and a friend of Italo Balbo; this made him first approach and then join the National Fascist Party, until he was appointed podestà. He devoted himself to the administration of the city with particular attention to the economic situation, urban reconstruction and cultural initiatives. After his resignation, due to the institution of the anti-Jewish laws (1938) and with the death of Balbo (1940), he definitively distanced himself from Fascism: the persecution of his family by the regime, his flight to Switzerland and his subsequent return to Ferrara when the war was over definitively ended his political career. His figure as a Jewish personality holding posts linked to Fascism makes him the subject, even today, of investigation by historians and members of the cultural and political world.

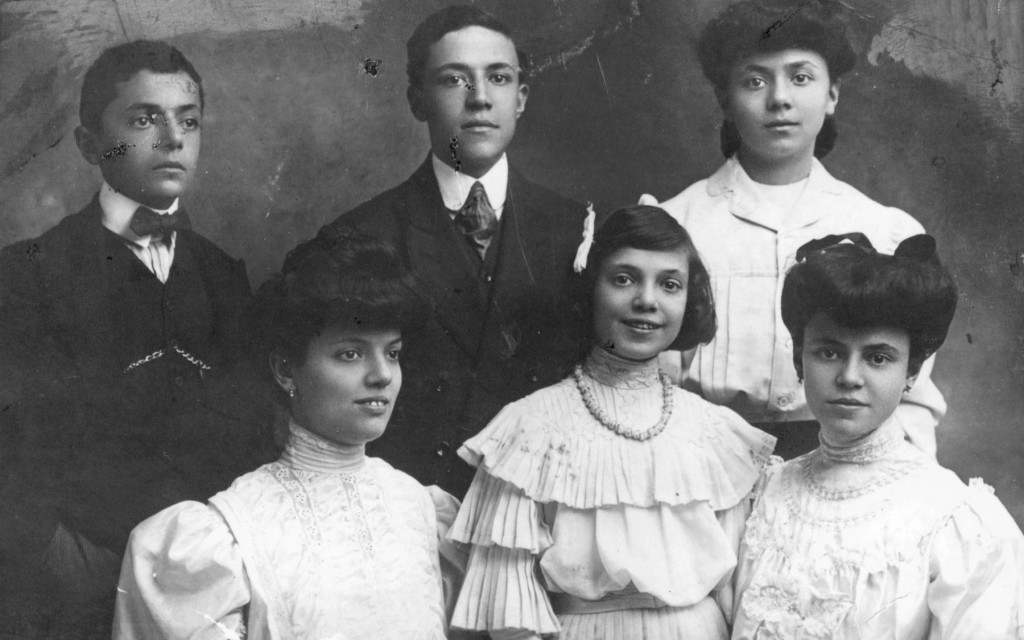
The six Ravenna siblings in 1908. Standing, back, from left: Renzo (1893–1961), Gino (1889 – Auschwitz 1944), Alba (1891 – Auschwitz 1944); foreground: Margherita (1885 – Auschwitz 1944), Lina (1896–1970) and Bianca (1886–1944).

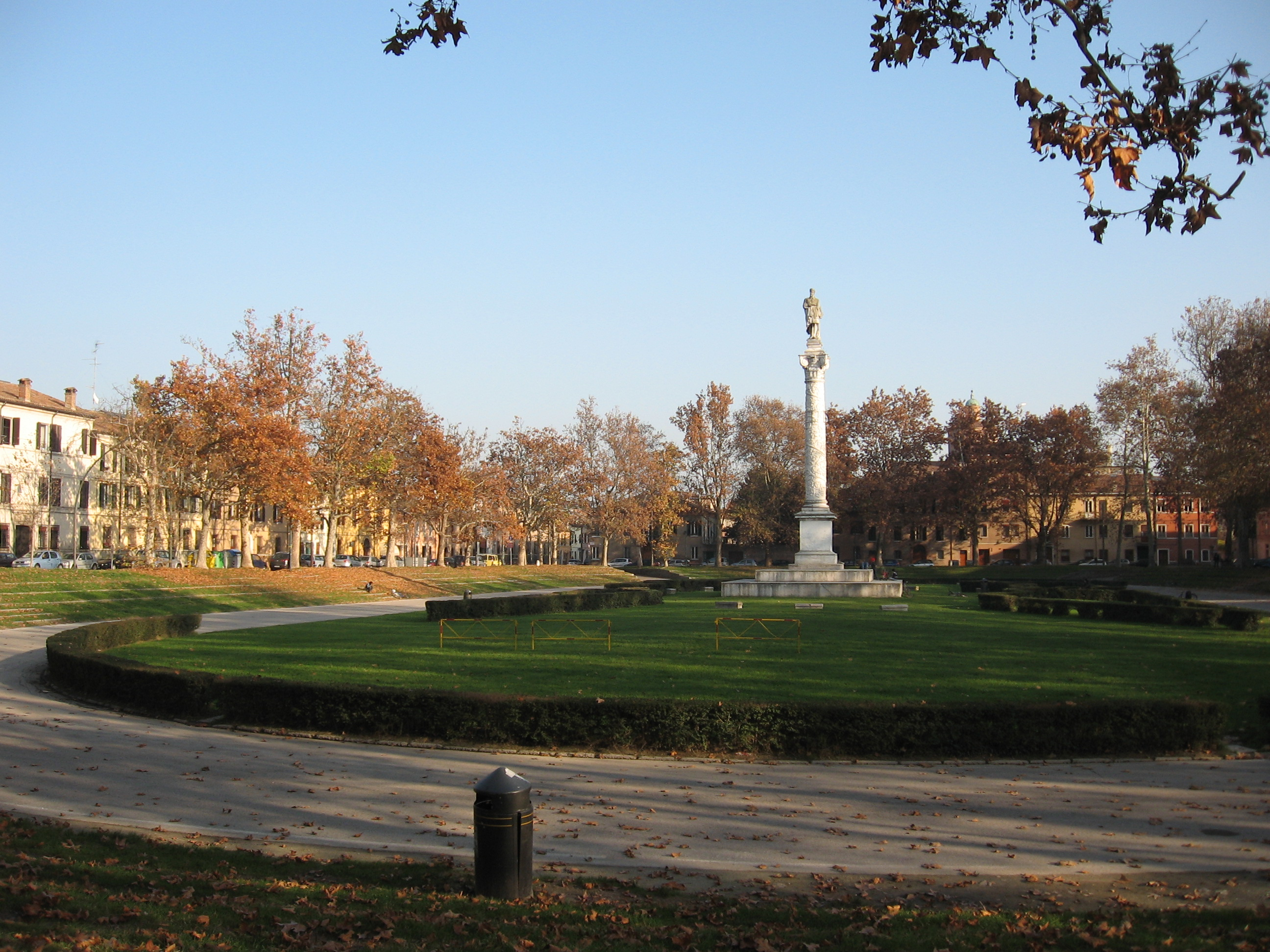
Ariostea Square in Ferrara. The Ravenna family moved to a house on Corso Porta Mare across from it in 1898, after having lived in Via Vittoria in the ghetto for generations.

== Biography ==
=== Early years, Great War, beginning of forensic career and marriage ===
The son of Tullio Ravenna and Eugenia Pardo, the fifth of six siblings, Renzo was the grandson of Isaia Ravenna, the first Hebrew teacher in the Regio Liceo Ginnasio "L. Ariosto" in Ferrara. By his parents' choice he attended Italian public schools instead of Israelite ones.

For young Renzo, his meeting with Italo Balbo in the Ferrara Gymnasium, at which they were both placed on the student team, proved decisive for his entire life.

In 1912 he joined the army as a volunteer and in 1913 enrolled in the Faculty of Law at the University of Ferrara. Ravenna was, in September 1914, among the 25 Ferrara personalities to found an interventionist group, and when the conflict broke out in 1915, he was called to arms and sent to war, first to the Vicenza area and later to Albania. He took a final discharge with the rank of captain in 1919, and in the same year graduated in law. He then began practicing law, initially in an established city firm and later in one of his own. At the same time he began to receive positions in the Public Administration of Justice. In 1921 Ravenna married Lucia Modena.

=== Adhesion to fascism and beginning of political career ===
==== Situation in Ferrara and relations with Italo Balbo ====
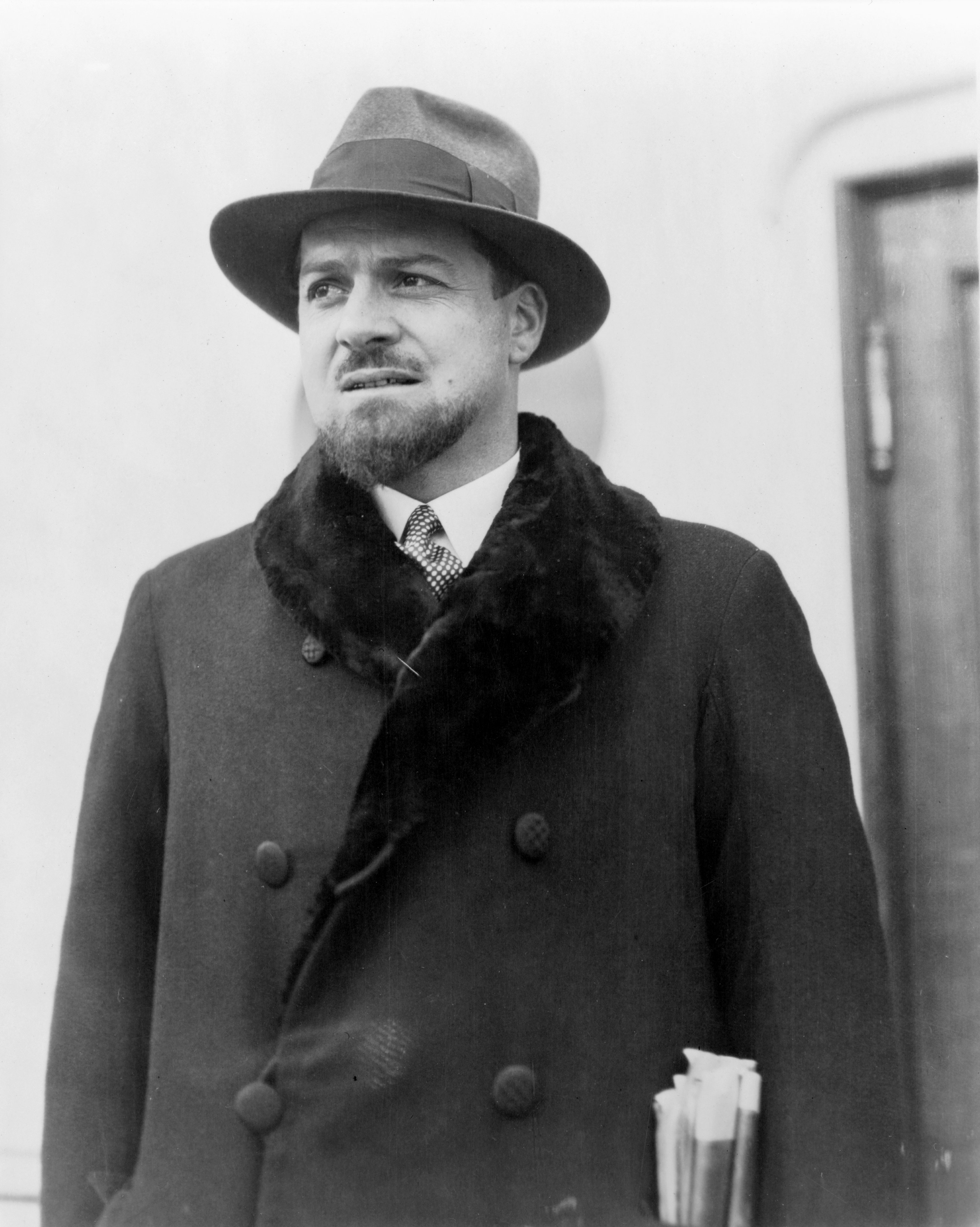
Italo Balbo

In Ferrara squadrismo, supported by the large landowners who wanted to contain socialist worker and union demands, resulted in various episodes of violence, such as the Minzoni murder. After the first violent years Italo Balbo sought trusted personalities through whom he could change his public image; these included Ravenna, the journalist Nello Quilici and Umberto Klinger, for several years the city's federal secretary. The link between Fascism and the local bourgeoisie was strengthened, even with the Jewish component, and later, to this end, cultural aspects inspired by Ferrara's Este history were enhanced. On the cultural pages of the Corriere Padano, directed by Quilici, wrote Ferrara personalities who later distanced themselves from Fascism; among them were Giorgio Bassani, Michelangelo Antonioni and Lanfranco Caretti. Bassani later, around 1941, joined an antifascist group and was imprisoned.

==== Fascist Ravenna ====
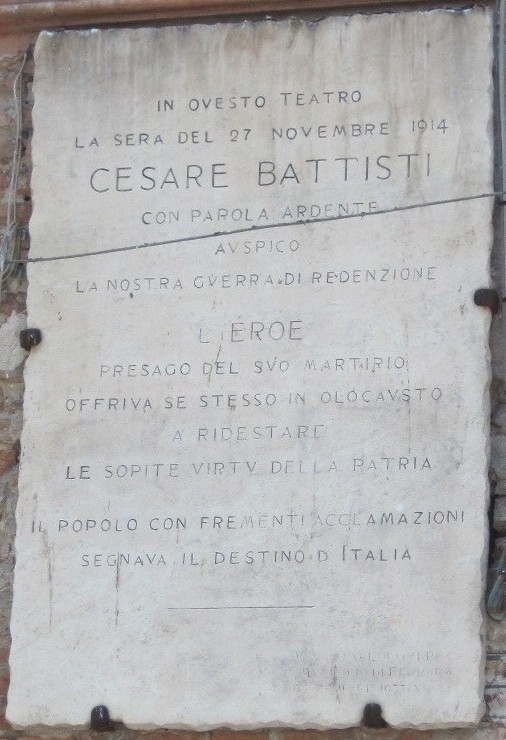
Epigraph commemorating Cesare Battisti's speech in Ferrara, November 27, 1914. Inviting the Trentino irredentist was the then 21-year-old Renzo Ravenna, future mayor of the city.

Ravenna initially approached Fascism by being attracted to nationalist and irredentist ideas, (Note: It was Ravenna himself, a few years earlier, who invited Cesare Battisti to Ferrara for a speech that ended with the audience chanting, "Viva Trento, Viva Trieste!" Pavan (2006, p. 18.)) as was also the case for various members of the Jewish bourgeoisie, (Note: Consideration partly corrected by the following: "Recent studies have downplayed the image of a unanimous and convinced adhesion of the Ferrarese Jewish community to early Fascism... Among the first signatories was, for example, Enrico Bassani, the writer's father, and not Renzo Ravenna, the future podestà," Provasi (2010, p. 94.)) and his long-standing friendship and esteem for Balbo, despite the obvious difference between the two, was very influential at this stage. With Balbo and Panunzio he founded a revolutionary action group in the city, and became part, in 1922, of a small circle of the party official's close associates, was a candidate in the local administrative elections at the end of that same year, in a climate of strong political contrast and violence, and became an alderman. In the meantime, he continued to practice his profession as a lawyer, although he devoted less and less time to it. In 1923 his assessorship was directly involved in the early stages of urban planning intervention in the city, particularly with the restoration of the Castello Estense and the Palazzo del Comune. On that occasion he contributed to the decision to rebuild the tower that fell in 1570 at the beginning of the earthquake swarm that struck the city until 1574, also participating with a donation. (Note: In the public subscription for the construction of the tower promoted by the Corriere Padano, Balbo and Ravenna appear, who donated 500 and 200 liras respectively. More than 4,000 donations were counted among which appear the names of many members of the local Jewish community. Pavan (2006, p. 44))

Later, his extraneousness to the acts of squadrismo that marked the rise of Fascism in Ferrara, (Note: Italo Balbo at that time was looking for honest and prepared personalities, as well as those loyal to him, to ward off from himself and fascism the negative repercussions associated with the Minzoni murder, Pavan (2006, p. 43.)) his secular position and the professional esteem he enjoyed prompted Balbo to propose him as the leader of Fascism in Ferrara, with a formal invitation to join the National Fascist Party (PNF), in 1924. (Note: The Ravenna affair should be included in a more precise analysis of the Jewish presence in Ferrara. "The First World War, in which the Jews of Ferrara, as well as those of the rest of the peninsula, had participated in great numbers, ended up representing the first real official recognition of belonging to the Italian nation." To this it should be added that many Jews in the Ferrarese community, belonging to the landowning bourgeoisie, later chose fascism to defend their interests and to oppose socialism, Guarnieri (2011, p. 49.) Here it should be pointed out that the Ravenna family were merchants, not landowners.) Ravenna then began heading the PNF's Ferrarese Federal Secretariat and then followed Balbo to Rome, when the latter was appointed undersecretary of the National Economy. This experience, however, was short-lived, partly for personal reasons. Toward the end of 1926, when the Fascist laws came into effect, he was appointed extraordinary commissioner to head the Municipality of Ferrara. These provisions, in particular Law No. 237/1926, replaced with government-appointed authority all municipal and provincial administrations that had hitherto been elective.

=== Podestà of Ferrara ===
==== City administrator ====
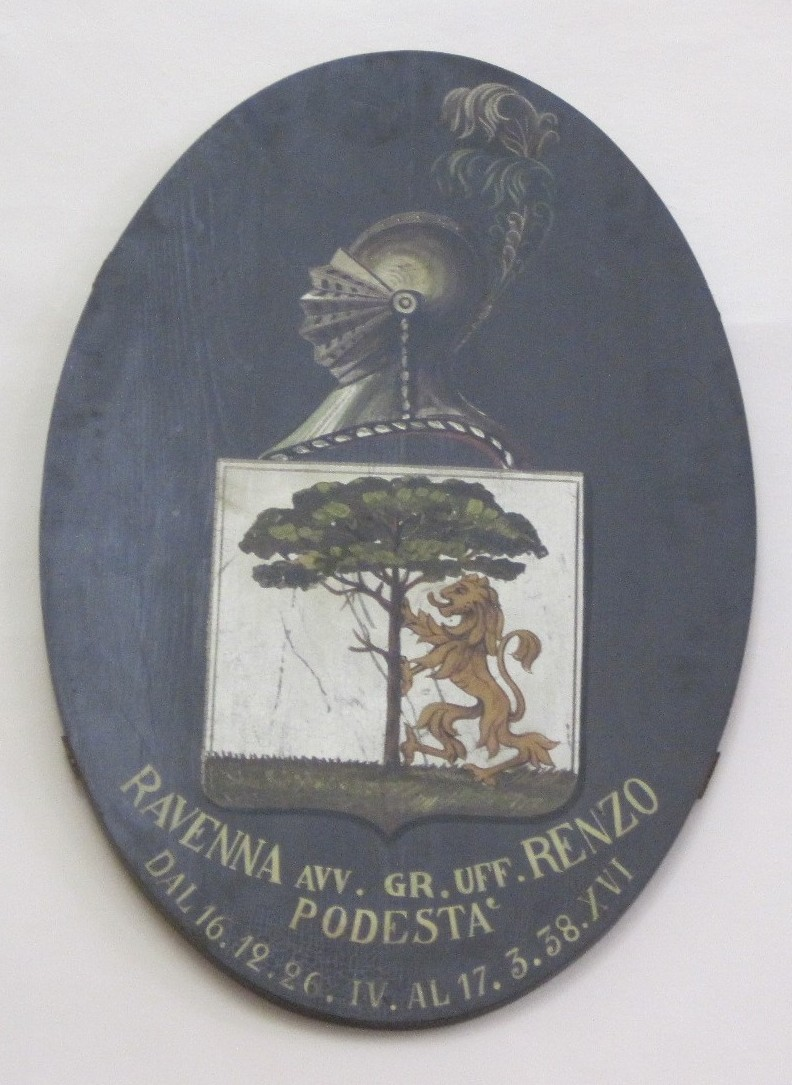
Coat of arms of the mayor Renzo Ravenna, Municipality of Ferrara

Renzo Ravenna was appointed Podestà of Ferrara on December 16, 1926, by royal decree and received a telegram of congratulatory good wishes from his friend Italo Balbo, who had personally committed himself to this result. He thus began his activity as the city's first administrator and, in that role, demonstrated that he possessed, in addition to personal honesty, the skills required by the important function, in full compliance with Fascist directives. (Note: An example of the loyalty cited in the actions of the podestà can also be identified in his full adherence to the population policy, with the opening in Ferrara in 1927 of a section of the OMNI. Renzo Ravenna was a member by right, and operated in line with national indications, Ferrara State Archives, Prefecture, Cabinet, b.169, fasc.5; letter from prefect Cesare Bertini to the Ministry of the Interior, October 8, 1926.) (Note: Ravenna in particular gave his full support to the Fascist demographic policy by organizing a section of the OMNI in Ferrara in 1927. Renzo Ravenna was a member by right, and he operated faithfully following the regime's directives. Pavan (2006, p. 63.))

==== Beginning of activity as podestà ====
One of his first and significant political acts was to confirm in their roles several valuable technicians from the previous administration, even though they were known anti-fascists; in particular, among others, Girolamo Savonuzzi and Arturo Torboli, who were later killed in 1943, as later reported. The problems he immediately faced mainly concerned the situation of the municipality's finances, widespread unemployment and the destitution of many of his fellow citizens. He received numerous requests for aid throughout his tenure, to which he always responded.

Not infrequently then, he intervened not only as an administrator but also personally contributed economically in favor of some in need. (Note: Cases in which he personally supported the cost of university studies of some young people without means were not uncommon, as happened in the case of future historian Carlo Zaghi, Pavan (2006, pp. 39–41.)) He also established soup kitchens, active especially in the winter period, which remained in operation until his resignation. His commitment to the city's administration reduced the time he devoted to his professional practice, which nevertheless continued its activity, thanks in part to his collaborators.

===== Urban intervention =====
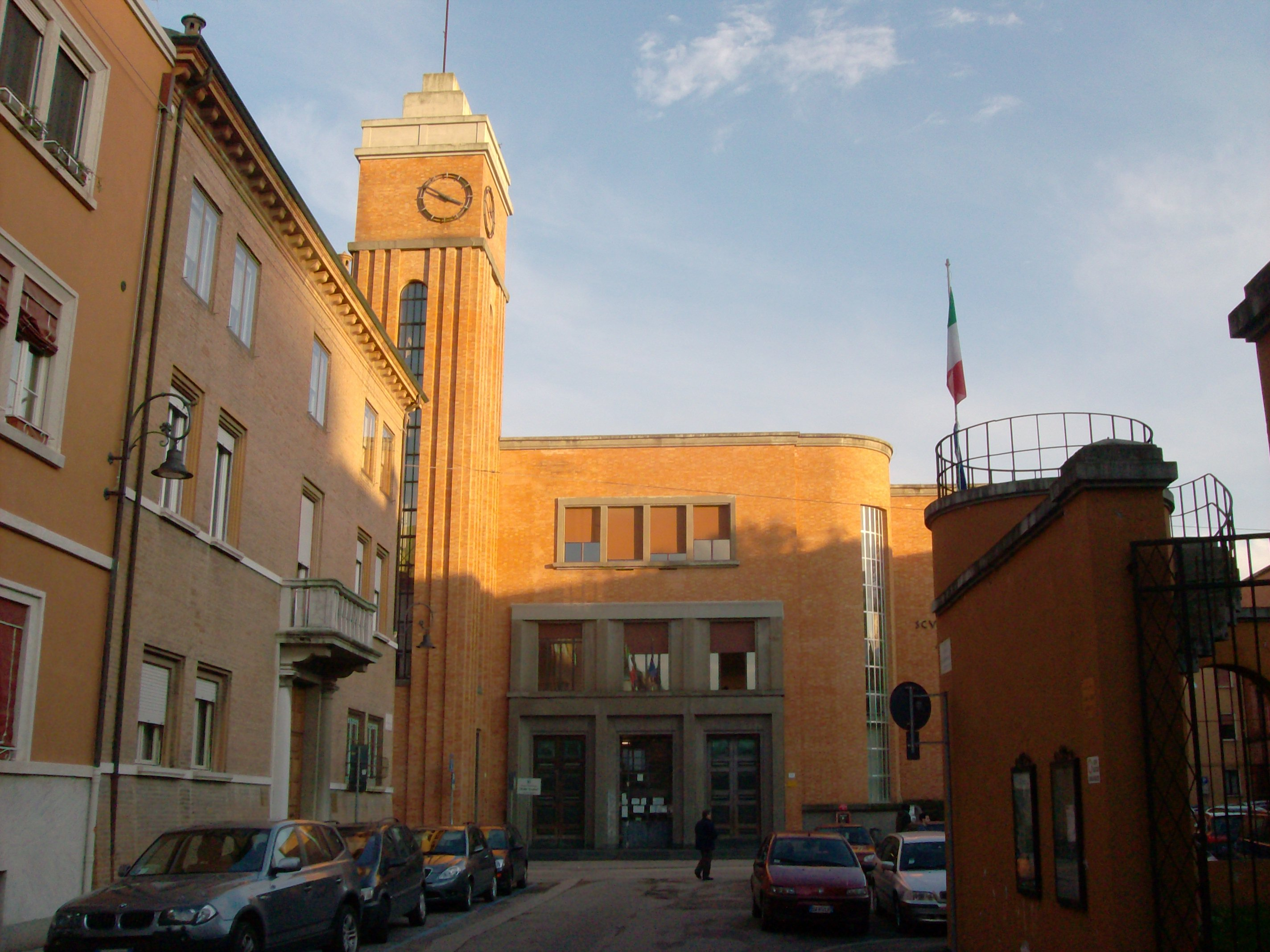
The Alda Costa Elementary School, designed by Carlo Savonuzzi, erected between 1932 and 1933 on the site of the former S. Anna Hospital, which was moved in 1927 to its location in Corso della Giovecca (active until 2012)

Since before his tenure at the helm of Ferrara (still as an assessor) he participated in the important urban renewal work later called Addizione Novecentista. The administration involved, in successive times, various architects and engineers with the task of redesigning the face of the city, which, in new buildings, almost always followed the new dictates of rationalism: Adamo Boari, Angiolo Mazzoni, Virgilio Coltro, Giorgio Gandini, Filippo Galassi, Girolamo Savonuzzi (chief engineer of the municipality) and his brother Carlo Savonuzzi were among the main architects of this renewal.

Interventions were put in place in many parts of the city, in addition to the already mentioned Castello Estense and Palazzo del Comune. Road and sewer networks were fixed, public lighting was extended, and various school buildings and social housing were built. The following date from this period of intense activity: the Post Office building, the aqueduct, the fruit and vegetable market, the Pastrengo barracks, the Air Force building, the Casa del Fascio, the Museum of Natural History, the Girolamo Frescobaldi Conservatory, the Boldini complex, and the relocation of the city's main hospital was realized. This amount of work required substantial financing, which only in part drew on the current expenses of the municipality. Loans of up to 20 years were activated with public credit institutions, and part of the funds came directly from the government, both by Balbo's precise intervention and by general political choice at the national level.

One of the motivations that prompted the realization of so many works, in addition to the main one of intervening urbanistically on the city, was certainly the need to provide employment for the growing number of laborers seeking work, although the latter always remained economically tied to agricultural activities. (Note: According to official data of the time, the number of unemployed in the province of Ferrara from 1926 to 1938 rose from 17 136 to 61 273 in January, with a peak of 78 274 in 1935. In August it rose from 1 115 to 23 172. Data from the Statistical Bulletin of the Municipality of Ferrara, Ferrara State Archives, Prefecture, Cabinet, b.394, fasc.2; b.404, fasc.2.) Ravenna, moreover, faithful to the party's indications, had various measures for population increase approved and confirmed in 1929; among them a bonus of 1,000 liras to couples who had 6 healthy children in 10 years and 2,000 liras to those who had 12 in 20 years, although these measures worsened the employment problem. Starting in the second half of the 1930s, Ravenna and Balbo thought about the creation of an industrial hub for the city, and this was in a further attempt to find an employment outlet that not even the major reclamation works had offered, despite expectations.

Carlo Bassi later analyzed this urban renewal work in its extensions to Melchiorri's work, and criticized some of its aspects. Citing engineer Ciro Contini's master plan presented in 1911, concerning the redevelopment of the San Romano area, later called "gutting", he explicitly refers to the later modified project ("which to call fanciful is putting it mildly") by architect Florestano Di Fausto, called to Ferrara by Balbo, and evidently shared by the podestà. In that area of Ferrara was then realized, after World War II, what Bruno Zevi called: "the rape of Ferrara". For Antonella Guarneri (head of the city's Museum of the Risorgimento and Resistance), the urban development implemented by Fascism in Ferrara was inadequate to Biagio Rossetti's pre-existing design of the Addizione Erculea, with the building of "heavy monuments" and "bourgeois neighborhoods" with little respect for the already existing ones.

===== Culture to enhance the city =====
Another of the aspects that distinguished the Ravenna podestariate (mentioned earlier) was its great attention to culture. In this action he was pushed and supported by Italo Balbo and assisted by Nello Quilici, director of the Corriere Padano. Balbo intended, by promoting this policy, to make people forget the squadrist violence of the early 1920s, and to give the city a different and more acceptable image of the party and its figure. The cultural initiatives were a propaganda tool for the regime but left a lasting legacy in Ferrara, in particular three museums: the National Archaeological Museum, housed in the Palazzo Costabili building, which collected material from the Spina excavations, the Boldini Museum and the Museo dell'Opera del Duomo. In contrast to the central government's choices, the City of Ferrara focused on local tradition, the revaluation of Este history and events and exhibitions that renewed its ancient splendor.

Thus came the resumption of the Palio, starting in 1933, and the important Exhibition to celebrate the Fourth Ariosto Centenary, also in the same year. Some sources show that the exhibition was proposed and decided upon by Balbo himself as early as 1931, and experts in the field such as art critic Nino Barbantini and art historian Adolfo Venturi were involved in its organization, as well as the head of Fine Arts Arduino Colasanti. Many efforts were made to publicize these initiatives nationwide, even involving the Istituto Luce for the occasion. The exhibition was a remarkable success for the time, with over seventy thousand visitors, including the Princes of Piedmont and Victor Emmanuel III. Prominent among the absentees, however, was Benito Mussolini.

Italo Balbo obtained from these cultural initiatives the personal recognition he sought, and Renzo Ravenna materialized his love for Ferrara, forging relationships often of true friendship with many city artists, such as, for example: Arrigo Minerbi, Giovanni Boldini, Filippo de Pisis, Achille Funi, Giuseppe Mentessi, and Annibale Zucchini. He was also able to establish and maintain cordial and fruitful relations with the highest religious authority, Archbishop Ruggero Bovelli, and always attended, in an official capacity, every event related to Catholic festivities. With the archbishop, he organized the celebrations for the eighth centenary of the cathedral, founded the Opera del Duomo institution and contributed diligently to the realization of the already mentioned Cathedral Museum. As for the University, which was "free", Ravenna requested its "royalization" several times, so that it would get more contributions from the state, but this was granted only in 1942. (Note: A free university, that is, economically supported exclusively by the local authorities, first and foremost the municipality; "royalization" was needed to obtain contributions from the state. Pavan (2006, p. 67.))

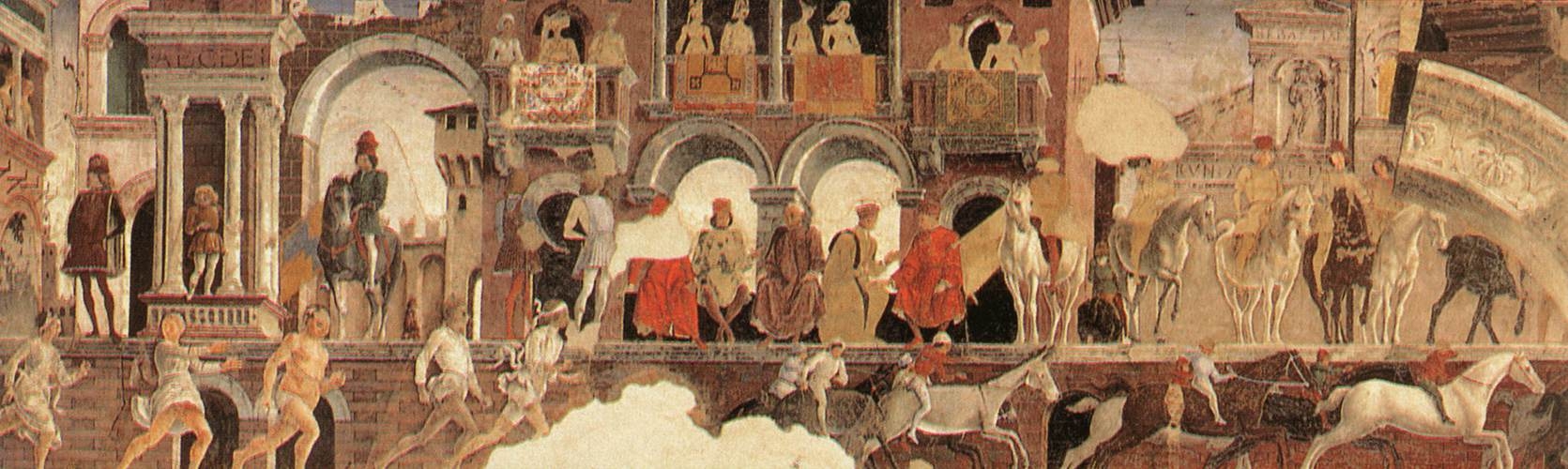
Francesco del Cossa, April detail of the palio races, Salone dei Mesi, Schifanoia Palace

Some of the high-impact and successful cultural activities to enhance the city, such as the Palio of Ferrara in particular, were spoiled excessively by Fascist propaganda. The contrada of San Luca was none other than the District Fascist Group "Arturo Breveglieri", while the contrada of San Giorgio referred to the PNF Fascio of Borgo San Giorgio, and in fact, when fascism fell, the Palio was suspended and then resumed only almost thirty years later, in 1967. Another critical aspect later highlighted was that, despite the organization of exhibitions and the opening of new museums, elementary and secondary education took a back seat during the Fascist period in Ferrara. Thought was given to the bourgeoisie but not to the most marginalized classes. In the immediate postwar period, school attendance recorded in the Ferrara area turned out to be below the national average.

==== Being Jewish ====
Starting in the second half of the 1930s, the situation in Ferrara (and throughout Italy) began to become increasingly difficult for Jewish communities. The permanence of Ravenna himself, as a Jew, in the function of podestà began to be questioned. On several occasions solicitations came from the government, addressed to Prefect Amerigo Festa, beginning in 1934, demanding his resignation (sometimes based on anonymous anti-Semitic accusations). The high official, a friend of Ravenna, after the necessary investigations entrusted to the forces of law and order, sent reassurances to Rome about the correctness and consideration the podestà enjoyed in the city, recalling the esteem in which he was held by Italo Balbo as well. Later then came indications from Rome to suspend all measures.

Toward the end of 1935, when his second term was about to expire, in spite of new ministerial attempts to deprive him of office on account of his religion, the support of Prefect Festa and the distant protection of Balbo caused the post to be renewed, and thus came the Roman reappointment. No direct intervention by Mussolini was proven in the affair, although the rivalry that pitted the head of the government and the party official originally from Ferrara, at that time governor in Libya, was well known. Today, therefore, it remains only a hypothesis that in the attack on Ravenna in those years was actually hidden a challenge to Balbo's power. At the same time as these events, in the province of Ferrara, many officials, professionals and teachers of the Jewish faith began to be exonerated from the public roles they held. (Note: Various Jews were replaced with Catholics in the City Hall, the Bank of Italy headquarters, air-raid protection and some schools. Pavan (2006, p. 117))

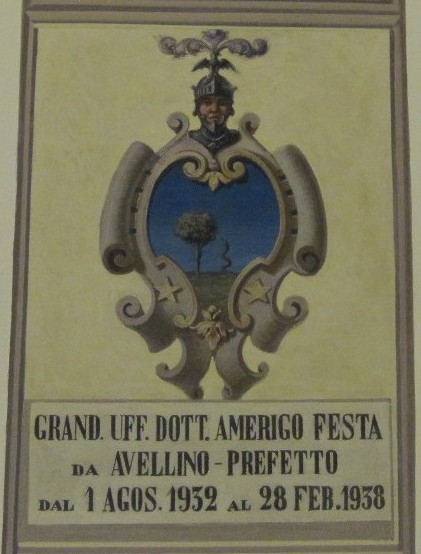
Coat of arms of prefect Amerigo Festa in the Hall of Coats of Arms of the Estense Castle, Ferrara

Anti-Semitic writings appeared on the walls (which were initially erased) and gradually the climate changed as preparations were made for the promulgation of the racial laws. Italo Balbo's protection extended until the beginning of 1938, but when it became clear that it was no longer possible to oppose the national directives, Ravenna himself preferred to avoid being dismissed on authority, anticipating the timing only by a few months and becoming one of the first illustrious victims of the regime's new direction. Prefect Festa, meanwhile, demonstrating that the political climate had changed, had already been promoted and removed, with assignment to another post, in Rome.

=== Resignation and distance from fascism ===
==== Proximity of Italo Balbo ====
On March 17, 1938, Renzo Ravenna resigned as podestà, and his lifelong friend Italo Balbo did not want to miss the ceremony. The Corriere di Ferrara devoted two issues to the event. On one, on the front page, it titled: "After twelve years of fruitful activity, lawyer Renzo Ravenna leaves the Podestà office"; while on the other: "In the presence of LL.EE. Balbo and Rossoni H.E. the Prefect installs as the new Podestà of Ferrara the Hon. Alberto Verdi to replace the lawyer Renzo Ravenna." In the days immediately following, his wife Lucia recounted, Balbo inquired from his friend whether, during his years at the head of the city, he had in any way taken advantage of his position to increase his personal finances. Hearing Renzo's negative answer, he apparently replied to him, affectionately, "What a fool!"

The resignation, officially submitted for health reasons (he had in fact suffered a heart attack, from which he had recovered), was followed by a serious and important decision. Ravenna, increasingly at odds with a government in which he had believed, and disappointed with the PNF, of which he had been an enthusiastic supporter, embittered moreover by the increasingly obvious anti-Semitic attacks and therefore humanly tried, returned, in July 1938, his party card and badge.

==== Social isolation and resumption of law practice ====
He began at that time a slow but gradual estrangement, at least on the public level, of all the people who had also been so close to him when he exercised the functions of podestà. Quilici, for example, and Archbishop Bovelli, while continuing, privately, to send him good wishes and signs of closeness, maintained a public position of full agreement with the racial laws. Only Balbo, until the time of his death, always manifested friendship and closeness. Among other things, he hosted him in Libya, where he was governor, and where he very laxly applied the laws in defense of race. The increasingly stringent regulations excluded Ravenna and all Jews even from the main gathering places in Ferrara, and when it came to clubs, members of the Jewish faith were simply considered to have resigned.

Quilici published, in September 1938, an article that certainly grieved Ravenna greatly, although formally still the personal relationship between the two remained marked by courtesy and apparently did not crack. Another painful moment, which touched him deeply, was the government-imposed dismissal from the army, with a discharge of all officers of the Jewish race, which became effective on January 1, 1939. Ravenna was forced to hand back his army badge, railroad card and passbook. Despite this, in June 1940, after Italy's entry into the war, he wrote to the Prefect of Ferrara asking to still be able to serve his country, proving that he was still loyal to the Fatherland, even if outside the Fascist Party.

Importantly, in the same days Silvio Magrini, president of the Ferrarese Israelite community, also wrote a letter to the city authorities confirming (despite the racial discrimination he concealed in the letter), the patriotism and loyalty of all Ferrarese Jews, in an obvious attempt to defend the position of the Jewish community from accusations of lack of closeness to the country. Professionally and economically, his early days without public office brought him several benefits. As mayor he had neglected his practice, and had not infrequently intervened with his own means to help those in need, while now he could resume full-time care of those who came to him, so his finances improved considerably. His practice was frequented by the wealthy Jewish bourgeoisie who were either attempting to defend their property, renouncing civil and political rights, or who wanted to take the difficult path of Aryanization, in cases of mixed marriages.

==== Balbo's death and final detachment from fascism ====
Italo Balbo's death on June 28, 1940, profoundly affected the subsequent affairs of Ravenna and his family. First of all a very important friend, to whom he was very close, was lost. Then fell the protection that the powerful party official had always extended over him, and, finally, the last link with Fascism was also lost. It had also been admiration for Balbo that had made Renzo Ravenna embrace the Fascist faith in his younger years. To the grief for the loss of his friend was then added, in those days, even that of not being able to take part in the funeral rite held in the city in his memory. Despite the fact that the law firm continued its activities, the situation meanwhile worsened. Social isolation and racial provisions imposed new renunciations, which Ravenna accepted with dignity, without asking for aid, either for himself or for family members and relatives. The fall of Mussolini in July 1943 gave hope for a favorable change, which, however, was soon proved disappointing in fact. Everything precipitated when the armistice of September 8 arrived, the Italian Social Republic was created and German troops also occupied Ferrara. In October there were the first arrests of both people believed to be anti-fascists and some Jews, including Rabbi Leone Leoni.

The large Ravenna family began to think about escape, while a nephew of Renzo's was already being arrested. One sister had been living in Rome for some time and another joined her, with her family. Events then precipitated; there was a roundup in the capital and sister Alba was arrested, locked in a sealed cattle car and sent toward the Auschwitz concentration camp. The convoy made a very brief stop in Ferrara and she managed, by speaking to a railroad man from inside the wagon, to get her brother to warn her to flee. Ravenna, reached by the message, prepared to travel to Switzerland, refusing Archbishop Bovelli's offer to find him safety in the Vatican but accepting financial help from his friend Balbo's widow for the costly expatriation to Swiss soil. Rosetta Loy partly recounts the story of Alba Levi Ravenna, Renzo's sister, in her First Words. Of the former mayor's entire large family deported to Auschwitz, only his nephew Eugenio (Gegio), the first to be arrested, survived and managed to return to Italy.

=== Exile in Switzerland ===
The Ravenna family (Renzo, Lucia and their three children), arrived on November 20 at a Swiss customs checkpoint near Lugano. At first they risked being sent back to Italy, and only a chance allowed the intervention in their favor of a Ferrarese diplomat friend of theirs, who was present in the embassy in Bern. (Note: It was Baron Zanetto Scola Camerini.) At first they had to face difficulties of various kinds, such as the separation of family members, economic problems and also those related to accommodation in a suitable lodging. After moving to Lausanne, Ravenna joined the group of Italian exiles. There he came in contact with Luigi Zappelli, a socialist-inspired industrialist who supported his fellow countrymen and who, at one point, also provided his family with free housing, thus helping them financially. During his stay in Lausanne, he forged and strengthened relationships with many exiles, such as Luigi Preti, Vittorio Cini and Giuseppe Volpi, a former finance minister. He collaborated with Raffaele Cantoni and Angelo Donati, prominent figures in the Jewish world in Italy, and tried in various ways to get news of his family members who had been arrested and deported. In 1944 he set up, together with others, a Relief Committee for Italian political and racial deportees, and put his ability to weave human relationships and his organizational skills at the service of this initiative. With the end of hostilities, several more months passed before Renzo Ravenna's family could return to Italy, and the first to do so, by now in the summer of 1945, was his son Paolo.

=== Return to Ferrara ===
As mentioned the return was not easy. First of all, it was not possible to cross the border immediately since it was closed by the Swiss authorities immediately after April 25. In addition, various reasons related to the early post-war phases made it inconvenient for Ravenna to see Ferrara again. The political climate was not favorable, and many wrote to him about this situation. Aristide Foà, his cousin and appointed vice-prefect of Parma by the CLN, his son Paolo, who had returned in the meantime, and his friend Giuseppe Bignozzi. These were days in which Ravenna was forced to reflect on the meaning of being a Fascist, and writing to Mario Cavallari, a socialist who had recently been appointed president of the city's Liberation Committee, his old friend, he summarized with "almost morbid love for my city" and "almost affectionate devotion for a Man on whose life and death only history will be able to comment" the essential aspects of the affair in his perception.

=== Judged for his past ===
Ravenna, who returned to Ferrara, was put on trial regarding two purge measures. The first, Lieutenancy Legislative Decree No. 364 May 31, 1945, concerned the confiscation of property linked to regime profits, and the second, linked to Lieutenancy Legislative Decree No. 702 of November 9, 1945, for the eventual expulsion from the bar. Both proceedings, in some ways due, were resolved in favor of former podestà and lawyer Ravenna. The proceedings related to the seizure of his assets, which had already been cautiously blocked by the court, were resolved fairly quickly, also, since his assets at that time were decidedly very meager, and because, in examining his public activity, no episodes of abuse or behavior designed to take personal advantage had been found. The judgment of purge from the order then also concerned other professionals, including Alberto Verdi, his successor in the office of podestà. In his specific case, it was ordered that since "no act of factiousness or malpractice had been committed", no purge action was taken. However, the president of the Cavallari Bar Association implicitly commented that for certain personalities who had held important positions for so long during the years of the regime, a sanctioning measure, albeit of lesser severity than that provided by law, would be appropriate.

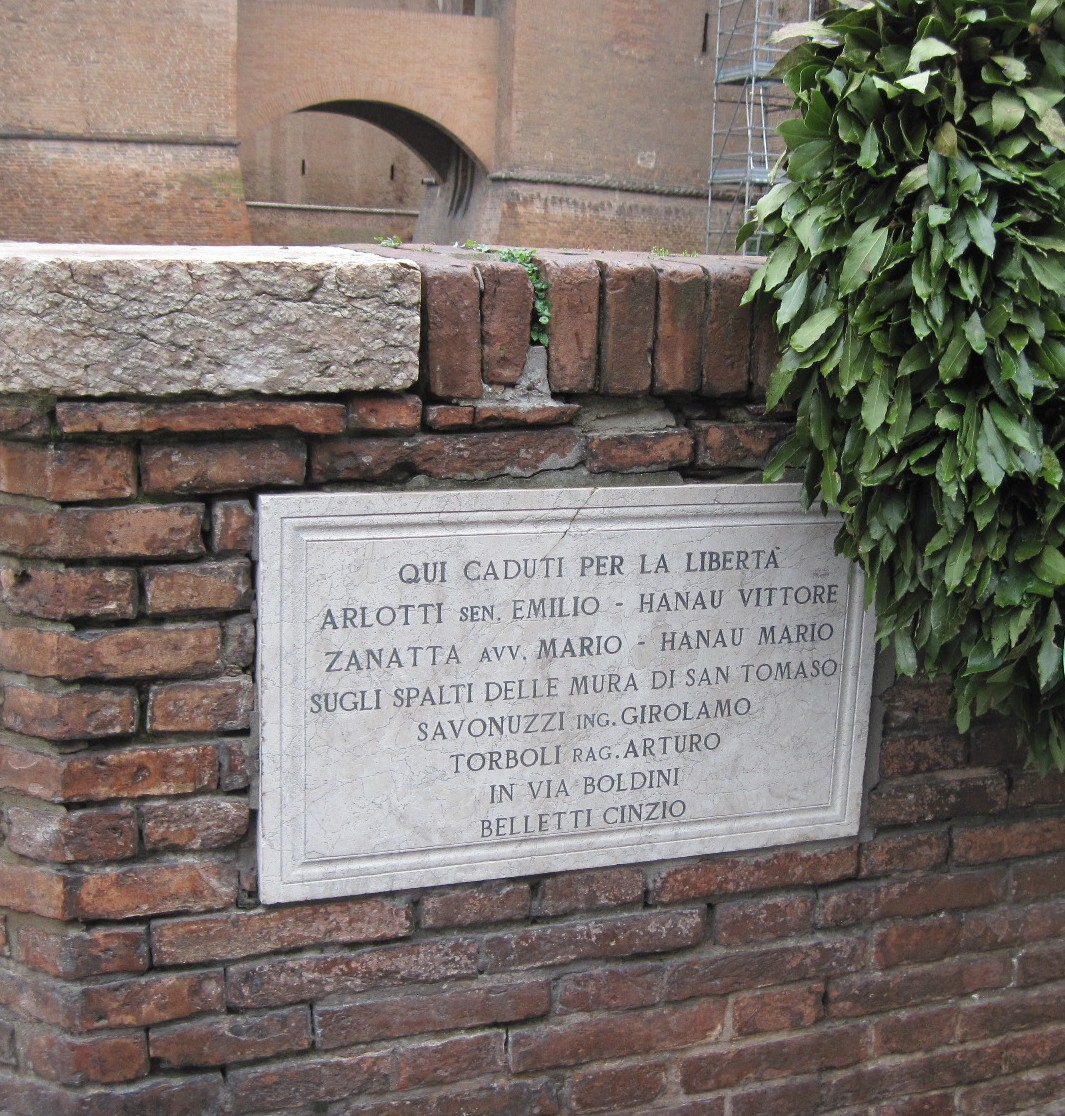
Ferrara, Castello Estense, moat wall. Tombstone of the fallen for freedom in Corso Martiri della Libertà.

Michele Tortora, mayor of Ferrara from 1945 to 1946, harshly attacked the previous administrations (thus including Ravenna's, which lasted 12 years), claiming in a report to the city council that the effects of fascist misrule had been deleterious. Feeling directly implicated, Ravenna addressed a letter to Tortora in which he claimed the amount of public works accomplished during his podestariate and the steady improvement of the situation compared to previous periods, as witnessed by the citizens who lived through those times. He also took advantage of the occasion to pay tribute to his collaborators, first and foremost Girolamo (Mimmo) Savonuzzi and Arturo Torboli, who were later killed by the fascists in 1943. The letter was followed by a private visit by the mayor to his home in Ravenna, which unofficially closed the matter with an implicit recognition of the former podestà's work. On no other occasion was the management of public affairs carried out by Ravenna later brought under indictment.

=== Last years ===
In his slow return to everyday life in Ferrara, he maintained relations with the lawyer Alberto Verdi, who had succeeded him in the town hall; with Luigi Zappelli, whom he had met in Switzerland; with Italo Balbo's widow; with Nello Quilici's family; and with Amerigo Festa, the prefect who had defended him and to whom he often wrote. He reconnected with those he had known and worked with, though of different political affiliations, and continued to practice law but refused to take on public or political roles. He had a heart attack (the second, after the one he had already suffered in 1936) that forced him to reduce his activity, but never to abandon it. Meanwhile, his son Paolo, also a lawyer, began working in his firm.

He always considered himself a victim and not the accomplice of a dictatorship, and in his last years he began to think about reevaluating the memory of his friend Balbo, forgetting his objective responsibilities. He thought of writing a book on the Ferrara party official, believing it was necessary to investigate his figure, which in his opinion was forgotten too quickly after his death. For this purpose he considered involving a historian at that time in his early thirties, Renzo De Felice, and later came in contact with Meir Michaelis, an Israeli scholar who sought him out because he was working on the reconstruction of that historical period. (Note: He would later publish Mussolini and the Jewish Question.)

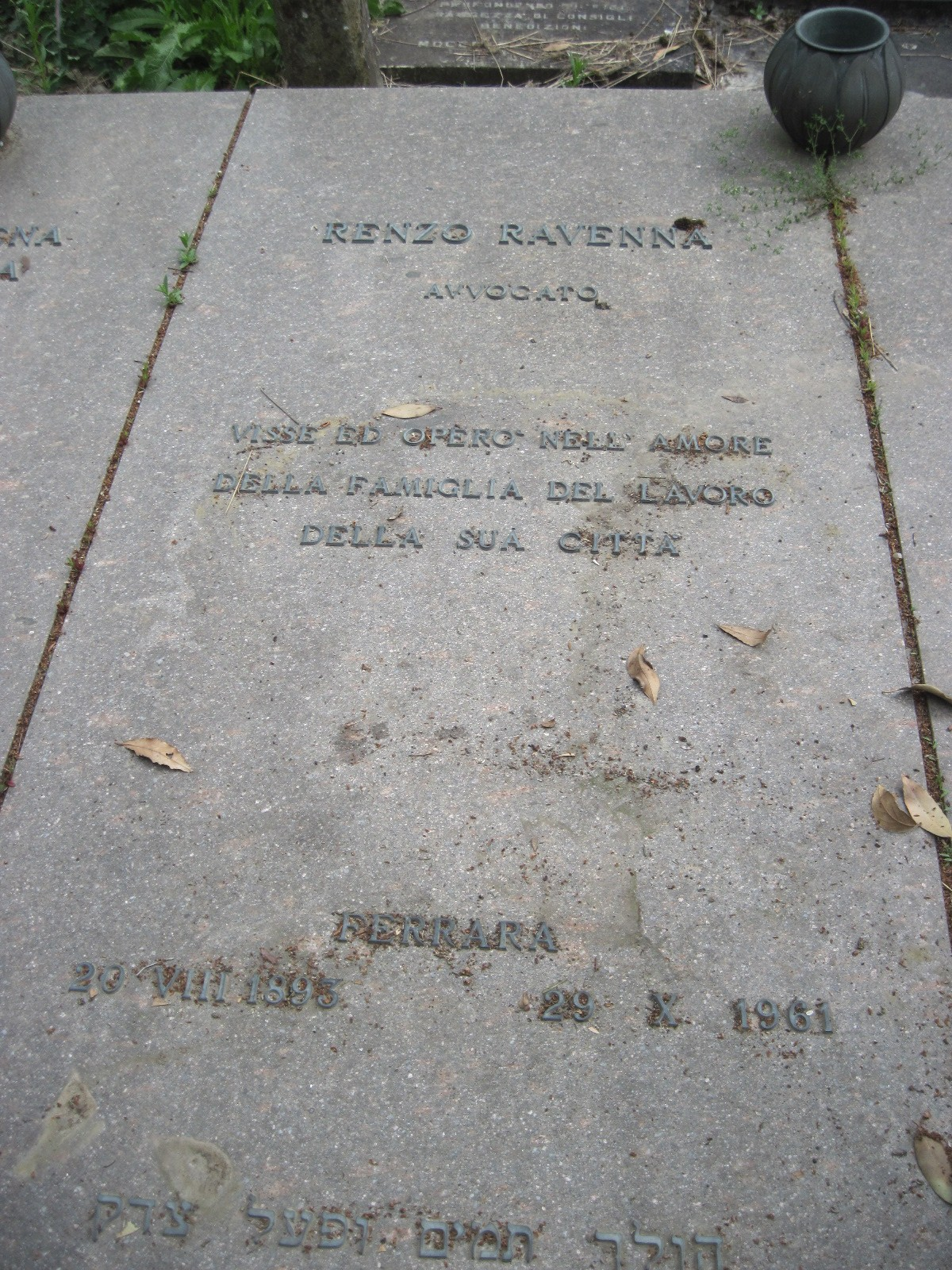
Tomb of podestà Renzo Ravenna in the Jewish Cemetery

With Michaelis he had an exchange of letters, which have remained in the records of his personal archives, in which he defended his friend, describing him as opposed to the racial laws, close to many Jews, always ready to defend him, and a courageous man, capable of accepting his role of great responsibility as governor of Libya. In 1957 Salvatore Aurigemma, founder and director of the National Archaeological Museum of Ferrara and director of the Spina excavations from 1924 to 1939, received a medal from the Municipality of Ferrara in recognition of his work, and on that occasion the archaeologist recalled the decisive support he had in his action from Italo Balbo and Renzo Ravenna. Towards the end he began to receive recognition, but his personality continued to be discussed, and on the occasion of his funeral the Municipality of Ferrara sent neither its official representation nor the municipal banner. Since 1961 Renzo Ravenna has been resting in the Jewish Cemetery in Via delle Vigne.

== Posthumous acknowledgements ==
In December 1961, when he had died, the Ferrara press wanted to honor the former podestà's commitment to the city's culture. It was his son Paolo who picked up the award. In the Ferrara City Council, his friend Antonio Boari, elected as a member of the Christian Democracy, about a month after his death, remembered him as a man capable of "great balance and serenity", animated by "love for his city", asserting that "Renzo Ravenna conceived modern Ferrara." Alberto Cavaglion, in his afterword to Pavan's text Il podestà ebreo, analyzed Ravenna's complex figure, calling him "a leading figure in Ferrara's history", "unique for the sympathy inspiring character-man", and "he had an original style of administrator of public affairs, what enabled him to lay the foundations... of modern Ferrara." He recalls that in him "political passion was never such as to overshadow love for his city or the value of friendship", notes "his strong sense of family", and makes one suspect in him "some form of naiveté" in his Fascist faith.

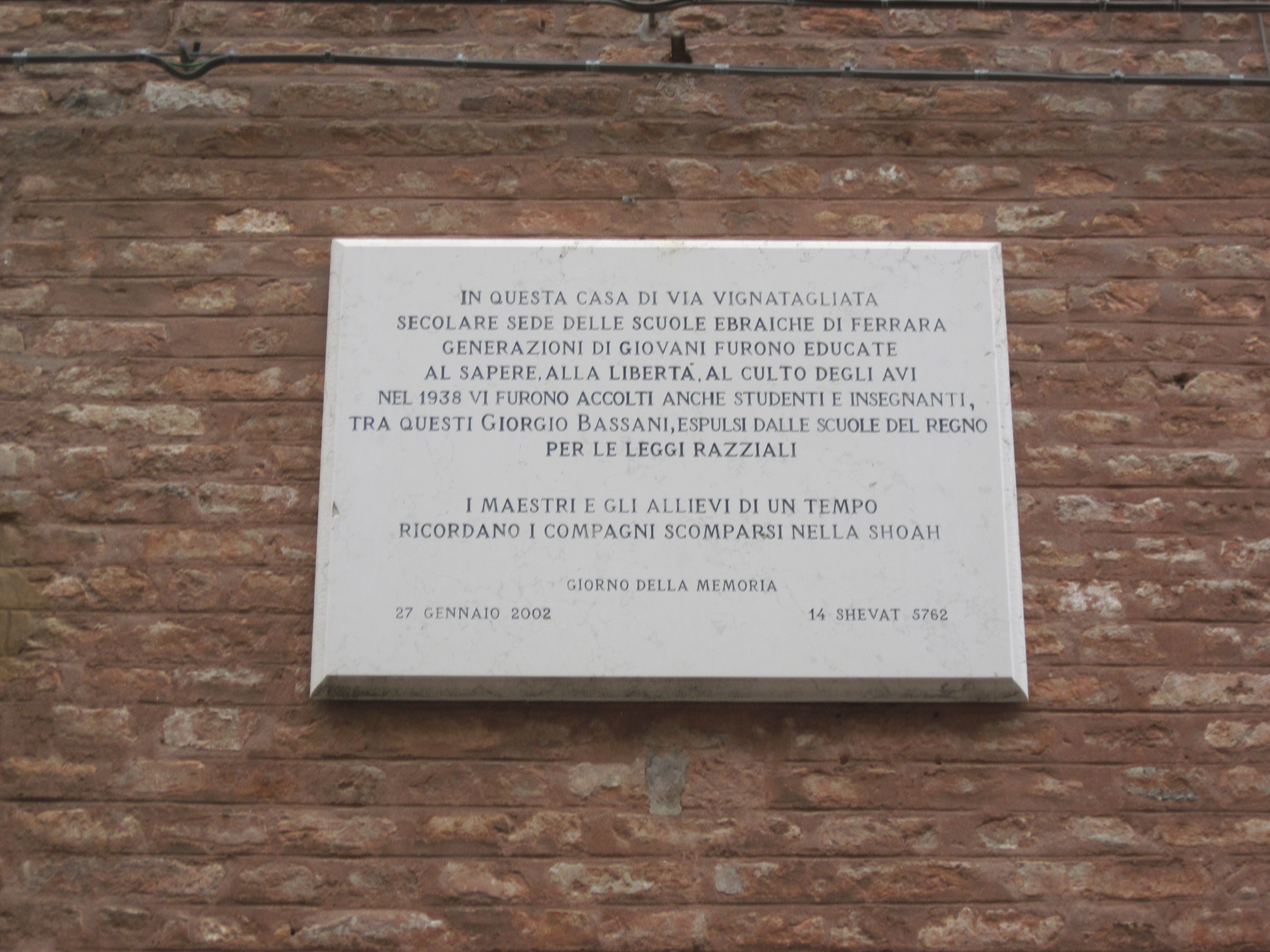
Ferrara, Via Vignatagliata, Jewish school plaque

== Renzo Ravenna and Giorgio Bassani ==
Giorgio Bassani was always highly critical of the Ferrarese Jewish bourgeoisie and his fellow citizens in general for their behavior during the twenty-year Fascist period. (Note: Bassani's negative judgment is partly mitigated by A. Guarnieri: "Numerous were the people of Ferrara, even Fascists up to that time of proven faith, who decided, when the persecutions became relentless, to help the Jews of the local community," Guarnieri (2011, p. 59.)) In the short story Una lapide in via Mazzini (contained in Cinque storie ferraresi) he spoke clearly of Podestà Ravenna, though changing his name, describing him as "that old Fascist lawyer Geremia ... so well-liked by the Regime, that one, that he managed for at least two years after 1938 to continue to attend from time to time even the Shopkeepers' Circle."

It should be added that Bassani belonged to a generation after Renzo Ravenna's, closer to that of his son Paolo to whom he was linked for a long time, for example in the protection of environmental and cultural heritage. The writer in his account emphasized some aspects of the fictional figure of Tabet that did not belong to the real person and that the podestà himself was affected, like the writer, by the racial laws, when even his children were forced to drop out of public school, starting in the 1938–1939 school year, in order to enroll in the Jewish school on Via Vignatagliata, in the ghetto, the same school where Bassani, as soon as he graduated, taught. In a volume published in 2014 that collects various works by Bassani, edited by Piero Pieri, the writer's views on the Ferrarese Jewish bourgeoisie, and in particular on Renzo Ravenna, are very well reiterated. The latter, however, is not explicitly named in the text, but only referred to as a longtime podestà in the city.

== Relationship with Jews and Catholics ==
Throughout his mayorship he had very limited official relations with the town's Jewish community, and even suspended the contribution the administration made annually to the Jewish cemetery. He shared cultural values, a personal faith, a respect for traditions and communal moments but little more. In other words, he had a secular approach and not an orthodox adherence to religion. Even if only once a year, a typical dish of Ferrara cuisine, salama da sugo, made its appearance on the Ravenna family table. He maintained ties of mutual esteem and true friendship for long years with Archbishop Bovelli, until his definitive return to Ferrara, with exchanges of good wishes on the occasion of holidays witnessed by letters that have come down to us. The attacks he suffered because of his religion, starting in 1934, were specious. (Note: The attack on the podestà - although apparently originating from an action initiated against him from Ferrara itself - began, in reality, from the center and was motivated exclusively by reasons of religious affiliation even without any specific facts being contested against Renzo or any possible shortcomings in his conduct or activity as an administrator being put into account. Pavan (2006, pp. 109, 110)) He always respected the Catholic hierarchies and collaborated with them, as already mentioned, driven first and foremost by his love for his city.

== See also ==
- History of the Jews in Italy
- Ghetto di Ferrara
- Giorgio Bassani
- Italo Balbo

== Bibliography ==
- Bassani, Giorgio (2012). Cinque storie ferraresi. Dentro le mura. Milano: Feltrinelli.
- Fabre, Giorgio (2005). Mussolini razzista. Dal socialismo al fascismo: la formazione di un antisemita. Milano: Garzanti.
- Fanchini, Guido Angelo (1930). La palestra ginnastica Ferrara: nel cinquantennio della fondazione, 1879-1929. Ferrara: Sate, Soc. An. Tip. Emiliana.
- Gallerani Ferrara, Enrico (2007). "Ferrara e il mito Estense". CLUEB. ISBN 978-8849129175. contained in Maria Giuseppina Muzzarelli (2007). Neomedievalismi: recuperi, evocazioni, invenzioni nelle città dell'Emilia-Romagna. Bologna: CLUEB. OCLC 930434303.
- Gandini, Giorgio (1994). La notte del terrore,15 novembre 1943: l'eccidio del Castello estense cinquant'anni dopo. Castel Maggiore: Book.
- Guarnieri, Antonella (2011). Il fascismo ferrarese. Dodici articoli per raccontarlo. Con un saggio inedito su Edmondo Rossoni. Ferrara: Casa Editrice Tresogni.
- Guarnieri, Antonella; Tromboni, Delfina; Guarnieri, Davide (2014), Lo squadrismo: come lo raccontarono i fascisti, come lo vissero gli antifascisti (PDF), Ferrara: Comune di Ferrara
- Loy, Rosetta (2006). La parola ebreo. Torino: Einaudi.
- Melchiorri, Gerolamo (2009). Nomenclatura ed etimologia delle piazze e strade di Ferrara e Ampliamenti, a cura di Carlo Bassi. Ferrara: 2G.
- Pavan, Ilaria (2006). Il podestà ebreo. La storia di Renzo Ravenna tra fascismo e leggi razziali. Roma-Bari: Laterza.
- Gli ebrei in Italia tra persecuzione fascista e reintegrazione postbellica. a cura di Ilaria Pavan, Guri Schwarz. Firenze: La Giuntina. 2001.
- Pieri, Piero, ed. (2014). Bassani. Racconti, diari, cronache (1935-1956). Milano: Feltrinelli.
- Provasi, Matteo (2010). Ferrara ebraica (una città nella città). Ferrara: 2G Editrice.
- Renda, Marilena (2010). Bassani, Giorgio. Un ebreo italiano. Roma: Gaffi Editore.
- Sarfatti, Michele (2007). Gli Ebrei nell'Italia fascista. Vicende, identità, persecuzione. Torino: Einaudi.
- Setta, Sandro (1993). Profughi di lusso, Industriali e manager di Stato dal fascismo all'epurazione mancata. Milano: Franco Angeli.
- Sarfatti, Michele (1979). Il "Comitato di soccorso per i deportati italiani politici e razziali" di Losanna (1944-1945). Firenze: Clusf. OCLC 908469163.
- Tromboni, Delfina (2005). «A noi la libertà non fa paura...» La Lega provinciale delle Cooperative e Mutue di Ferrara dalle origini alla ricostruzione (1903-1945). Bologna: Il Mulino.
