= Fireworks (disambiguation) =

Fireworks are low explosive pyrotechnic devices used for aesthetic and entertainment purposes.

Fireworks or Firework may also refer to:

== Film and television ==
- Fireworks (1947 film), a homoerotic experimental short film
- Fireworks (1954 film), a West German period musical comedy
- Fireworks (1997 film)', an Italian film
- Hana-bi ('Fireworks'), a 1997 Japanese film
- Fireworks (2017 film), or Fireworks, Should We See It from the Side or the Bottom?
- Fireworks (2023 film) (Stranizza D'Amuri), an Italian film
- Fireworks (2000 TV series), a South Korean TV series broadcast on SBS
- Fireworks (2006 TV series), a South Korean TV series broadcast on MBC
- "Fireworks" (30 Rock), a 2007 TV episode
- "Fireworks" (Not Going Out), a 2011 TV episode
- "Fireworks" (Reno 911!), a 2003 TV episode
- "Fireworks, Should We See It from the Side or the Bottom?" (If: Moshimo), a 1993 Japanese youth drama TV play and TV episode

== Literature ==
- Fireworks (play), a 1969 set of three one-act plays by Jon Swan
- Fireworks: Nine Profane Pieces, a 1974 short story collection by Angela Carter

== Music ==
=== Classical music ===
- Feu d'artifice ('Fireworks'), a 1908 composition by Igor Stravinsky
- Das Feuerwerk ('The Firework'), a 1950 musical comedy by Paul Burkhard

=== Groups ===
- Fireworks (indie rock band), from New York City
- Fireworks (punk band), from Michigan

=== Albums and EPs ===
- Fireworks (Angra album), 1998
- Fireworks (Bonfire album), 1987
- Fireworks (José Feliciano album), 1970
- Fireworks, by Pele, 1992
- Fireworks, by This Busy Monster, 2001
- Fireworks EP, by Embrace, 1997
- Fireworks: The Singles 1997–2002, by Embrace

=== Songs ===
- "Fireworks", by First Aid Kit, 2017
- "Firework" (song), by Katy Perry, 2010
- "Firework", by Boxer Rebellion from the 2016 album Ocean by Ocean
- Firework, by Got7 from the 2017 album 7 for 7
- "Firework", by Twice from the 2020 EP More & More
- "Fireworks" (Animal Collective song), 2007
- "Fireworks" (Drake song), 2010
- "Fireworks" (Purple Disco Machine song), 2021
- "Fireworks" (Roxette song), 1994
- "Fireworks" (Siouxsie and the Banshees song), 1982
- "Fireworks" (Snoop Dogg song), 2016
- "Fireworks" (The Tragically Hip song), 1998
- Fireworks, by Aimers, 2023
- Fireworks, by Ive from the 2026 album Revive+
- Fireworks, by Mitski from the 2016 album Puberty 2
- "Fireworks", by Schoolhouse Rock!, 1976
- "Fireworks", a 1920s jazz song by Spencer Williams
- Fireworks, by Sunwoo Jung-a and Jung Yong-hwa from the 2016 album Empathy
- Fireworks, from the 2007 soundtrack album Harry Potter and the Order of the Phoenix
- "Fireworks (I'm the One)", by Ateez from the 2021 EP Zero: Fever Part.2
- "Feuerwerk" (song) ('Firework'), by Wincent Weiss, 2017
- "Uchiage Hanabi" ('Fireworks'), by Daoko and Kenshi Yonezu, 2017
- "Fireworks", a song by Yesung, from the EP Beautiful Night, 2021

== Visual art ==
- Fireworks (Boldini), a portrait painting c. 1892-1895)
- Fireworks (Somov), a watercolour painting by Konstantin Somov, 1904

== Other uses ==
- Fireworks (horse) (1864–1878), an Australian racehorse
- Fireworks (magazine), a British magazine about fireworks
- Fireworks Entertainment, a Canadian film and television company
- Adobe Fireworks, drawing software
- Fireworks (video game), a horror puzzle game

== See also ==
- Music for the Royal Fireworks, a suite by George Frideric Handel
- "4th of July (Fireworks)", a song by Kelis, 2010
