= Ghetto di Ferrara =

- Ghetto di Ferrara (Italian)
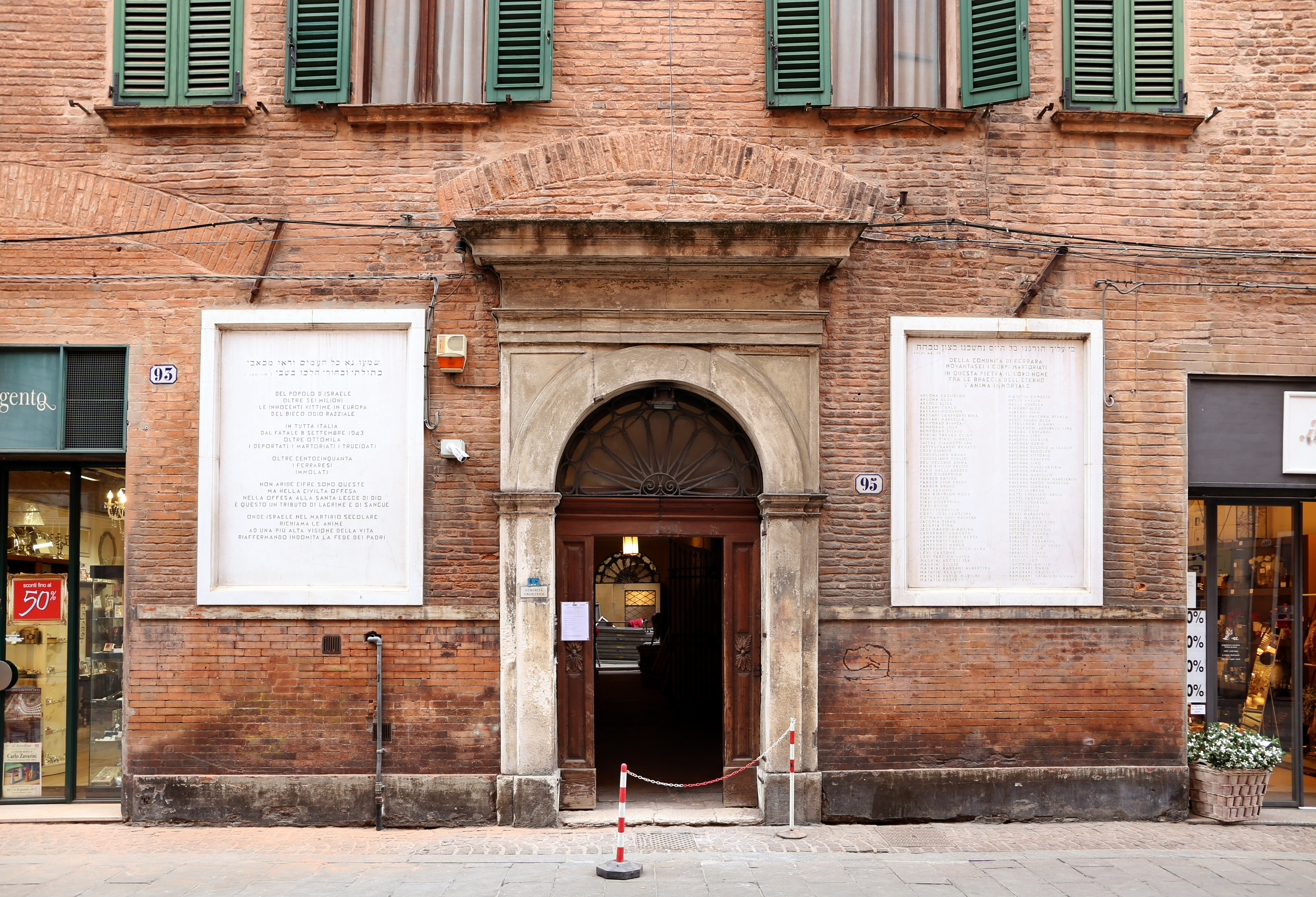
- The Jewish Museum in Ferrara, in the ghetto
- Interactive map of Ghetto di Ferrara
- 44°49′50″N 11°37′27″E
- Location: Ferrara, Emilia-Romagna, Italy

History
- Founded: 1624 closed 1859

The Ferrara Ghetto was established by an edict of Cardinal Cennini dated 23 August 1624, in one of the oldest areas of the city, a short distance from the Cathedral of San Giorgio (Ferrara) and the Castello Estense. It was permanently closed in 1859.

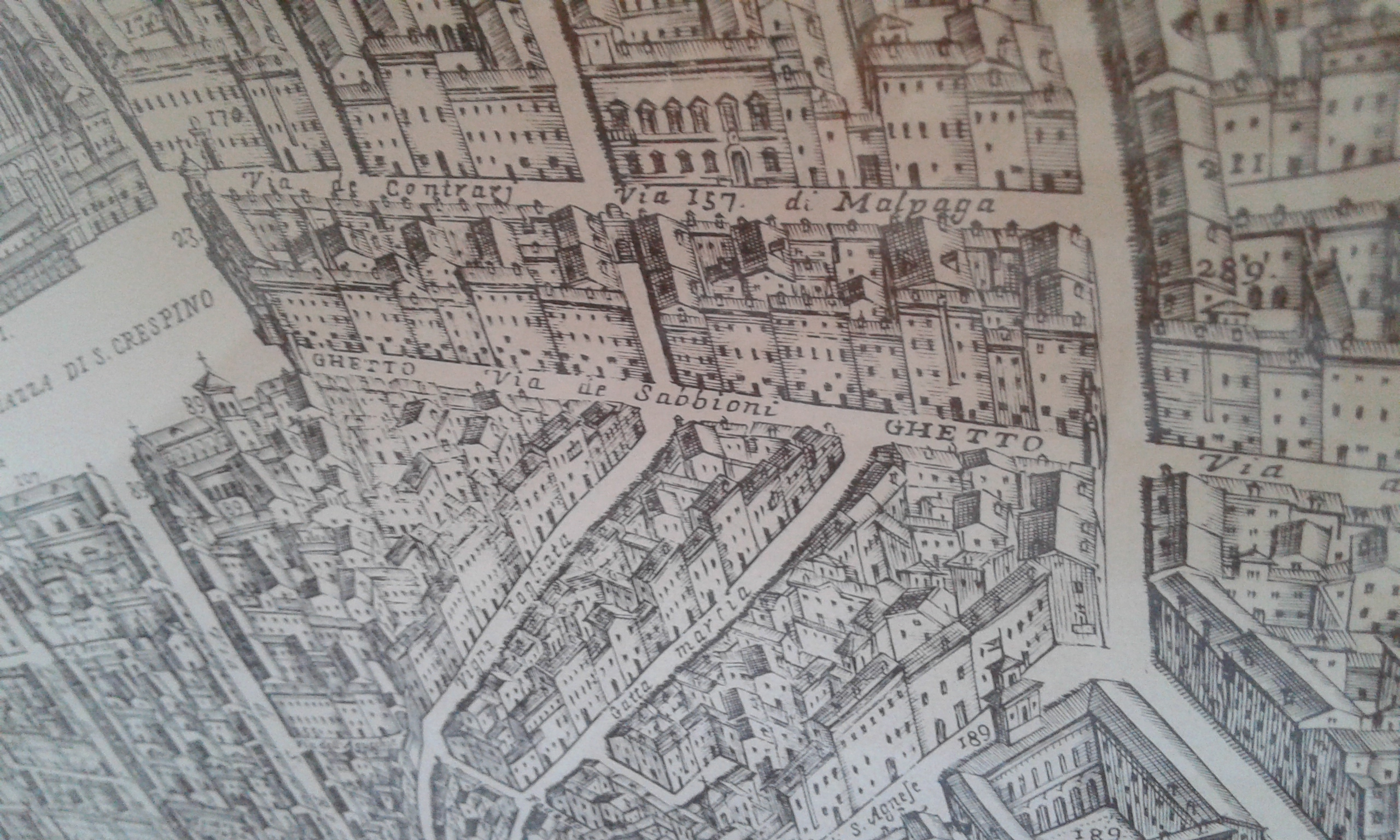
The ghetto, from a print by Andrea Bolzoni of 1747

== History ==
The Jewish presence in Ferrara predates the establishment of the ghetto by centuries. When it was imposed in 1627 about 1,500 Jews lived in Ferrara. The closure of the ghetto lasted over a century. The gates that the French occupation opened in 1796 closed again in 1826, albeit with less strict rules, until the unity of Italy in 1861.

== The Ghetto during Fascism ==
Even after its closure, it remained the centre of life for Ferrara's Jewish community, which Giorgio Bassani immortalised in his novels, Il giardino dei Finzi-Contini and Cinque storie ferraresi. After 1938, with the entry into force of the Fascist racial laws, the situation of Jews throughout Italy changed radically. In particular, in Ferrara, Jews continued to arrive from other provinces, thinking they would find a safer environment (thanks to the presence of Italo Balbo, a friend of Renzo Ravenna and always very open towards the Jewish community), the "Jewish enemy" hidden in society began to be denounced, and the ghetto, in fact, went back into operation.

== Situation ==
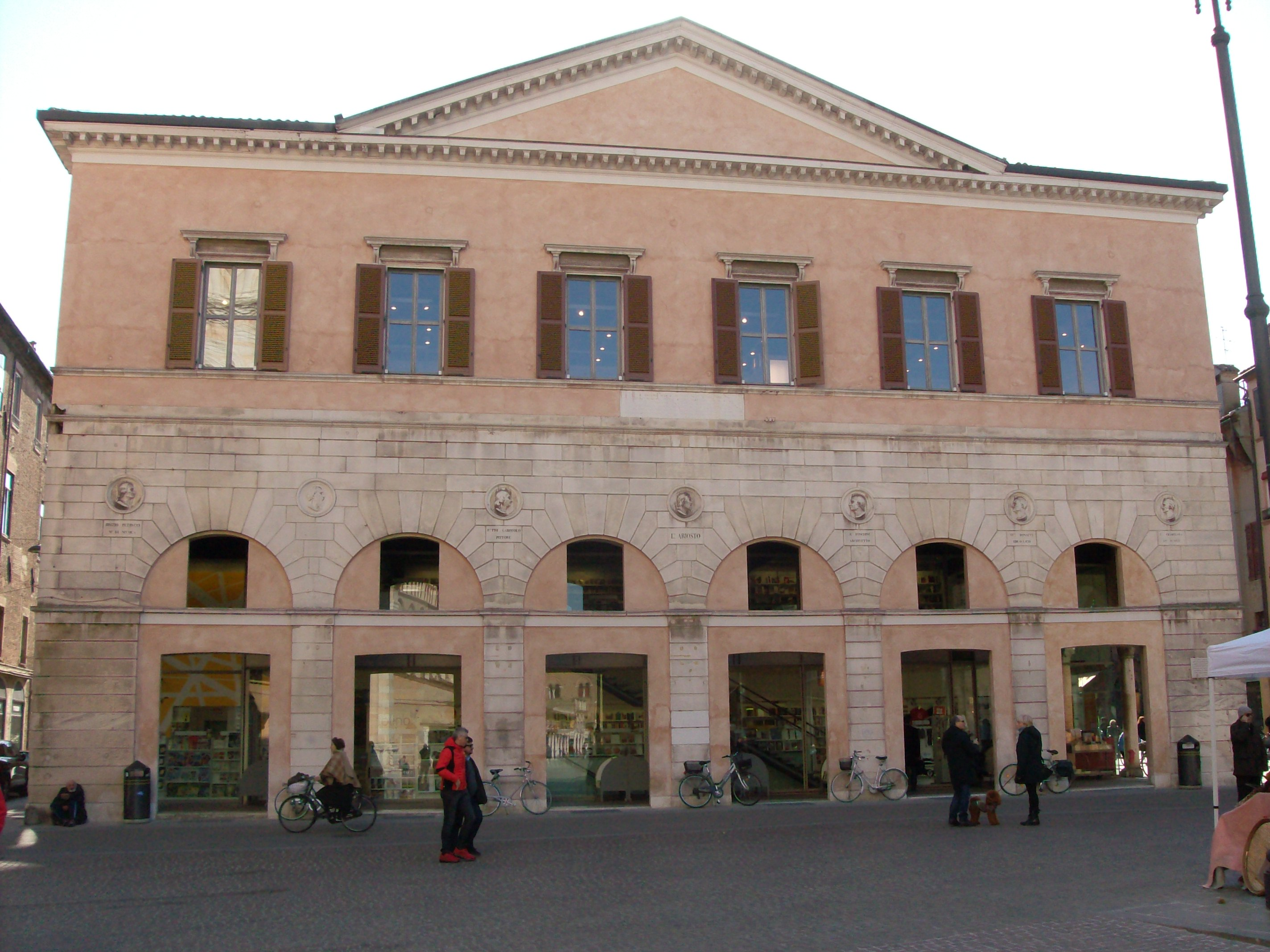
The Oratorio San Crispino where Jews were forced to attend religious services

The Jewish quarter has largely retained its original structure and character. From the cathedral square starts via Mazzini (formerly Via Sabbioni), the main street of the ghetto, typical until World War II for its old shops. One of the five closing gates was located at its entrance. This is commemorated by a plaque on the building of the former San Crispino Oratory, where Jews had to gather for forced sermons. Another gate was placed at the end of the street (at the junction with Via delle Scienze). On Via Mazzini 95 are the three synagogues in Ferrara, the only surviving ones among those existing in the ghetto, with the adjoining Jewish Museum, in a building used by the Jewish community of Ferrara since 1485.

From Via Mazzini one passes into Via Vignatagliata, with its ancient 14th-century buildings. At no. 33, two plaques commemorate the physician and philosopher Isacco Lampronti, at no. 44 there was once the Oven of the Azzime and at no. 79 the school that after the racial laws of 1938 housed Jewish children expelled from state schools and where Giorgio Bassani also taught.

The buildings in the other streets of the Ghetto date from the 15th century or later: via Vittoria (formerly via della Gattamarcia), via Torcicoda, vicolo Vignatagliata and piazzetta Lampronti. At the end of via Vignatagliata and via Vittoria there were two other gates to the ghetto and the fifth closed the access to via Contrari. In Via Vittoria at No. 39 stood the scola spagnola, later closed and converted into a private residence. The plaques honouring the donations of benefactors remain in the entrance hall.

== Bibliography ==
=== Italian sources ===
- Annie Sacerdoti, Luca Fiorentino, Guida all'Italia ebraica, Genova, Marietti, 1988, SBN IT\ICCU\TO0\1554582.
- Maria Giuseppina Muzzarelli, Gli ebrei, in Francesca Bocchi (a cura di), Storia illustrata di Ferrara, vol. 2, San Marino, Aiep, 1987, pp. 465–480, SBN IT\ICCU\RER\0034049.
- Adriano Franceschini, Presenza ebraica a Ferrara. Testimonianze archivistiche fino al 1492, a cura di Paolo Ravenna, Ferrara, Carife, 2007, ISBN 978-88-222-5741-3.
- Antonella Guarnieri, Il fascismo ferrarese. Dodici articoli per raccontarlo, Ferrara, Tresogni, 2011, ISBN 978-88-97320-03-6.
- Silvio Magrini, Storia degli ebrei di Ferrara, dalle origini al 1943, a cura di Andrea Pesaro, Livorno, Belforte, 2015, SBN IT\ICCU\TO0\1929824.
- Silvio Magrini, Gli Ebrei e gli Estensi, in La Rassegna Mensile Di Israel, vol. 5, n. 7/8, Firenze, Rassegna mensile di Israel, 1930, pp. 410–414, OCLC 5542591466
