= Palazzo Municipale of Ferrara =

Palazzo Municipale
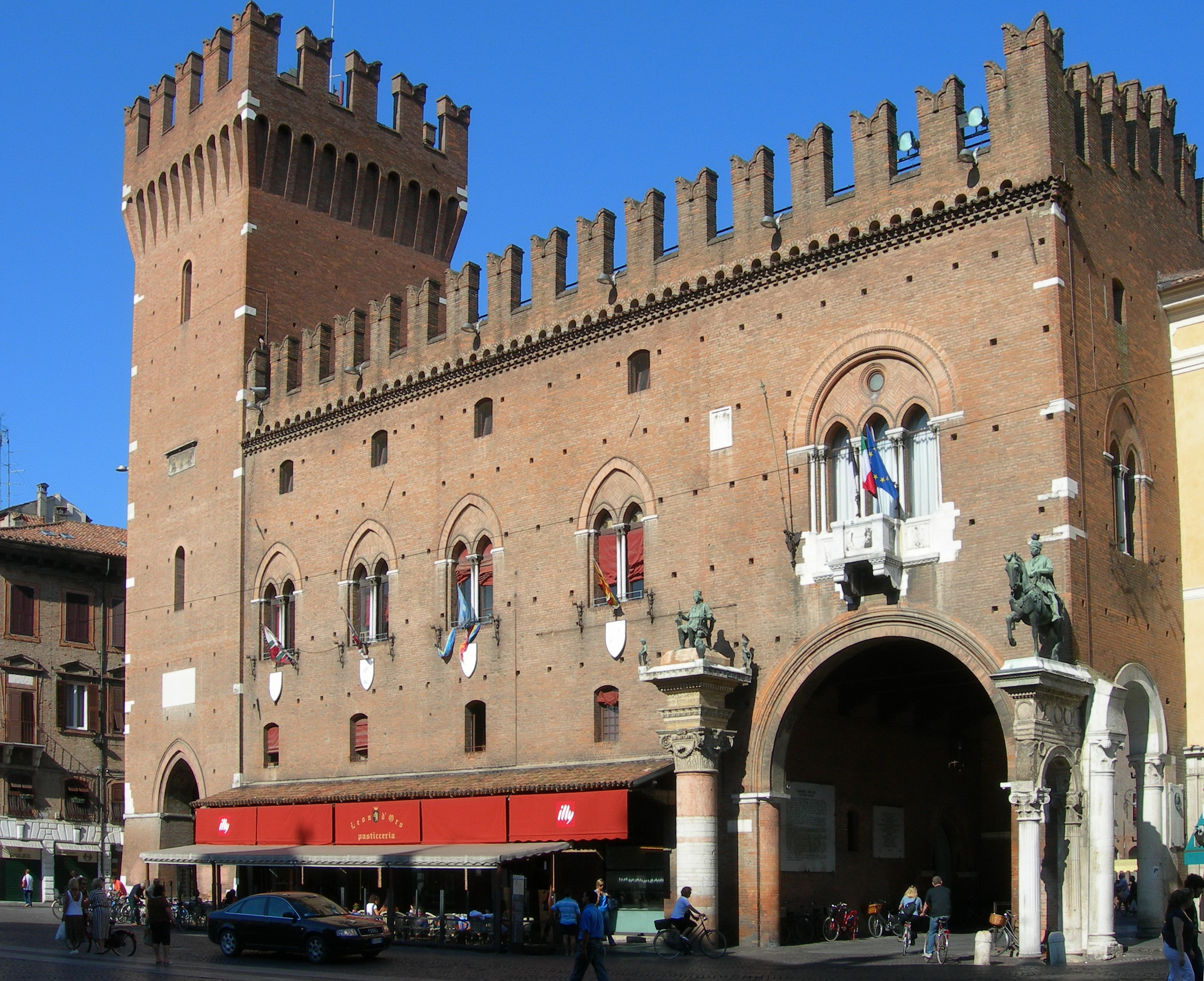
- Town Hall building, façade on Corso Martiri della Libertà
- Interactive map of the Palazzo Municipale area
- Alternative names: Palazzo Ducale Estense

General information
- Status: In use
- Type: Palace
- Architectural style: Renaissance, Gothic
- Location: Ferrara, Italy, 2, Piazza del Municipio
- Coordinates: 44.8361°N 11.619153°E
- Current tenants: Municipality of Ferrara
- Construction started: 15th century

The Municipal Palace of Ferrara is located in Piazza del Municipio 2. It was the ducal residence of the Este family until the 16th century, when the court moved to the nearby Castello Estense. It is the seat of the municipality of Ferrara.

== Description ==
The original core of the building was begun in 1245 along via Cortevecchia and assumed its final dimensions between 1472 and 1481. The main entrance, placed in front of the Cathedral of San Giorgio called the Volto del Cavallo, is flanked by the equestrian statue of the marquis Niccolò III and that of the duke Borso d'Este seated on the faldistorio holding a sceptre in the act of administering justice. After the proclamation of 1443, on 2 June 1451 the equestrian statue of Nicolò III was hoisted on an unusual type of support inspired by Roman triumphal arches or according to another hypothesis by column-shaped pedestals that would recall Roman imperial models found in Constantinople. The construction of the monument was entrusted to the Florentine sculptors Antonio di Cristoforo (the figure of the marquis), Nicolò Baroncelli (the horse), who cast both the animal and the statue, and Meo di Checco, better known as Bartolomeo di Francesco, assisted by Lazzaro di Padova and Baccio de Netti from Florence for the transposition into marble of the base designed by Leon Battista Alberti, to whom the marquis Leonello d'Este turned for advice and judgement regarding the designs.

The statue of Borso, also completed in 1453 by Baroncelli, who in the meantime had become Niccolò del Cavallo, was perfected by his son Giovanni and brother-in-law Domenico di Paride in the family workshop due to the death of the author, and completed with the addition of four shield-bearing geniuses in 1456, executed by Domenico, with the Este and City coats of arms placed at the corners of the base. Inaugurated on 19 December 1454, it was first placed in front of the Podestà's residence (to the right of the then Palazzo della Ragione) and a year after Borso's death, in 1472 it was moved next to his father's, where it remained until its destruction in October 1796 to obtain bronze for cannons. The Este family’s coat of arms was added to the base in 1456.

Seismic events and military occupations led to considerable changes over the centuries. Between 1924–1928, the façade in front of St George’s Cathedral was rebuilt in neo-medieval style, while the remaining part along today’s Corso Martiri della Libertà had already been remodelled in 1738. The façade in front of the cathedral and the tower of Victory, in place of which, until the earthquake of 1570, the Rigobello tower had once stood, then collapsed, were designed by the engineer Carlo Savonuzzi, who was in charge of completing the work on the main façade of the Palazzo Comunale begun by Venceslao Borzani in 1923 and completed in 1928.

The city administration, represented by the podestà Renzo Ravenna, in turn supported by Italo Balbo, played a large part in this reconstruction. One episode to be remembered concerns the repositioning on the ancient columns on either side of the Volto del Cavallo of copies of the bronze statues of Borso d’Este enthroned and Niccolò III d’Este on horseback, destroyed in 1796 during the French occupation, which the Antiquities and Fine Arts Directorate-General opposed. The podestà, Nello Quilici in the pages of the Corriere Padano and the entire citizenship protested until they obtained ministerial authorisation.

The statues observable today are bronze copies, executed in 1927 by the sculptor Giacomo Zilocchi, inspired by some sketches collected by the erudite Patrizio Antolini as well as based on other statues, frescoes, medals and theatre costumes. Zilocchi was the modern artist who most resonated with the aesthetic and moral tastes of Giuseppe Agnelli, then director of the Biblioteca comunale Ariostea. Between 1924 and 1930 there was a dense correspondence between the two, mainly concerning the execution of the two statues, also strongly desired by Agnelli and paid for by the engineer Giuseppe Maciga. Zilocchi was the artist who most found Giuseppe Agnelli's aesthetic and moral tastes.

As for the wall decoration, the author of the renovation was Giulio Medini, contrary to what was believed until some time ago when it was indicated as having been carried out by Adolfo Pagliarini. In 1927 Medini was commissioned to carry out the decorative reconstruction, being able to work on the faint traces of fragments of the original frescoes found during restoration work. These traces were copied, providing the decorator with an almost precise trace. In the infradoxes of the Volto del Cavallo, he executed the ornaments depicting the Este coats of arms (referable to Niccolò and Borso) and phytomorphic elements: red flowers divided into groups of three in which one towered above the others, reminiscent of those present in the upper loggia of Casa Romei (attributed to Desiderato da Lendinara), to which Medini probably drew direct inspiration. In 1927 he also decorated the entrance to the nearby Torre della Vittoria.

Interestingly, on the north side of the building is the so-called via Coperta, a protected, five-arched walkway connecting the palace with the Castello Estense. Near the access to this street Alfonso I d'Este created the famous Alabaster Chambers.

== See also ==
- Torre della Vittoria

== Sources ==
=== Italian sources ===
- Jadranka Bentini (a cura di), Bastianino e la pittura a Ferrara nel secondo Cinquecento - Catalogo della Mostra tenuta a Ferrara, Palazzo dei Diamanti, dal 1 settembre al 15 novembre 1985, Bologna, Nuova Alfa editoriale, 1985, SBN IT\ICCU\RAV\0004607.
- Adriano Franceschini, Giurisdizione episcopale e comunità rurali altopolesane: Bergantino, Melara, Bariano, Trecenta, Bologna, Patron, 1986, SBN IT\ICCU\MIL\0064981.
- Lucio Scardino, Giacomo Zilocchi: valente rifacitore delle statue de' principi estensi: il carteggio con Giuseppe Agnelli, Ferrara, Liberty house, 1991, SBN IT\ICCU\CFI\0163878.
- Comune di Ferrara, Il Volto del Cavallo - Palazzo municipale di Ferrara - Rilievi ricerche restauri, Ferrara, Liberty house, 1993, pp. 117-140
- Barbara Ghelfi, Ferrara estense. Guida storico-artistica, Silvana editoriale, 2004 pp. 36-39, ISBN 88-8215-751-2.
- Marcello Toffanello, Ferrara. La città rinascimentale e il delta del Po, Libreria dello Stato, Istituto poligrafico e Zecca dello Stato, 2005 pp. 28–33, ISBN 88-240-1113-6.
- Sul problema attributivo dell'attività di Leon Battista Alberti a Ferrara cfr. Francesco Ceccarelli, Leon Battista Alberti, gli Este e Ferrara, in Massimo Bulgarelli, Arturo Calzona, Matteo Coriana, Francesco Paolo Fiore (a cura di), Leon Battista Alberti e l'Architettura, catalogo mostra Mantova Casa del Mantegna 16/09/2006 - 14/01/2007, Milano, 2006, pp. 245–249. ISBN 8836607322
- Ilaria Pavan, Il podestà ebreo: la storia di Renzo Ravenna tra fascismo e leggi razziali, Bari, Laterza, 2006, ISBN 8842078999.
- Per i plastificatori fiorentini cfr., Marcello Toffanello, Le arti a Ferrara nel Quattrocento. Gli artisti e la corte, Edisai, Ferrara, 2010, pp. 300–314. ISBN 8895062892
