= Fireworks (Boldini) =

Painting by Giovanni Boldini

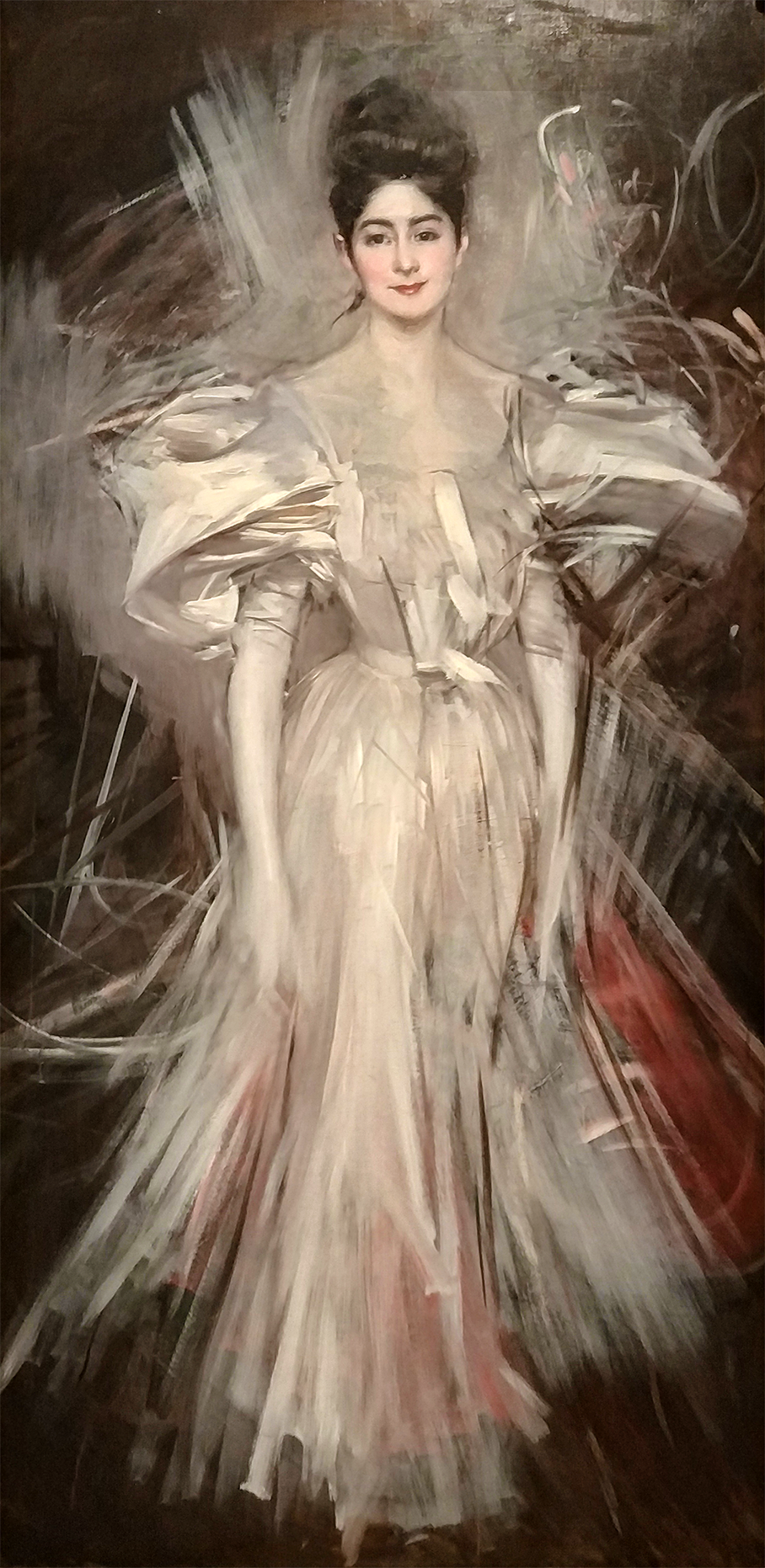
- Artist: Giovanni Boldini
- Year: c. 1892-1895
- Medium: Oil on canvas
- Dimensions: 200 cm × 99.5 cm (79 in × 39.2 in)
- Location: Museo Giovanni Boldini; Ferrara

Fireworks (Italian: Fuoco d'artificio) is an oil painting on canvas by the Italian painter Giovanni Boldini, dated from c. 1892–1895. It is held at the Museo Giovanni Boldini, in Ferrara, since its acquisition from the collection of Emilia Cardona in 1974.

== Description ==
This imposing canvas represents in life size an unidentified beautiful woman with large dark eyes and black hair worn in a bun. Barely smiling, her face enlivened by thick scarlet lips and rosy cheeks, the female figure stands out against a dark background; she is wearing a very elegant white silk evening dress whose shimmering tones change from pink to purple, and her arms are held between long gloves and puffed sleeves. She acquires the consistency of an apparition that is both ethereal and real.

Executed most likely in the 1890s, and therefore representative of Boldini's mature portraits, Fireworks owes its title to the broad brushstrokes of light color, real "saber strokes", which the painter used and seem to dematerialize the dress of its model and wrap its silhouette in a sort of vaporous halo. The notable audacity of the chromaticism and the composition, combined with a touch which appears as the pictorial seal of the artist and which seems to touch on abstraction, denotes a formal freedom entirely unusual for the time.

This unknown lady of high society, framed by a shimmer of white satin, is striking in its expressive softness; an image constructed through free brushstrokes that resemble flowing ribbons and a limited range of colors masterfully harmonized against a dark background.
