= Torre della Vittoria =

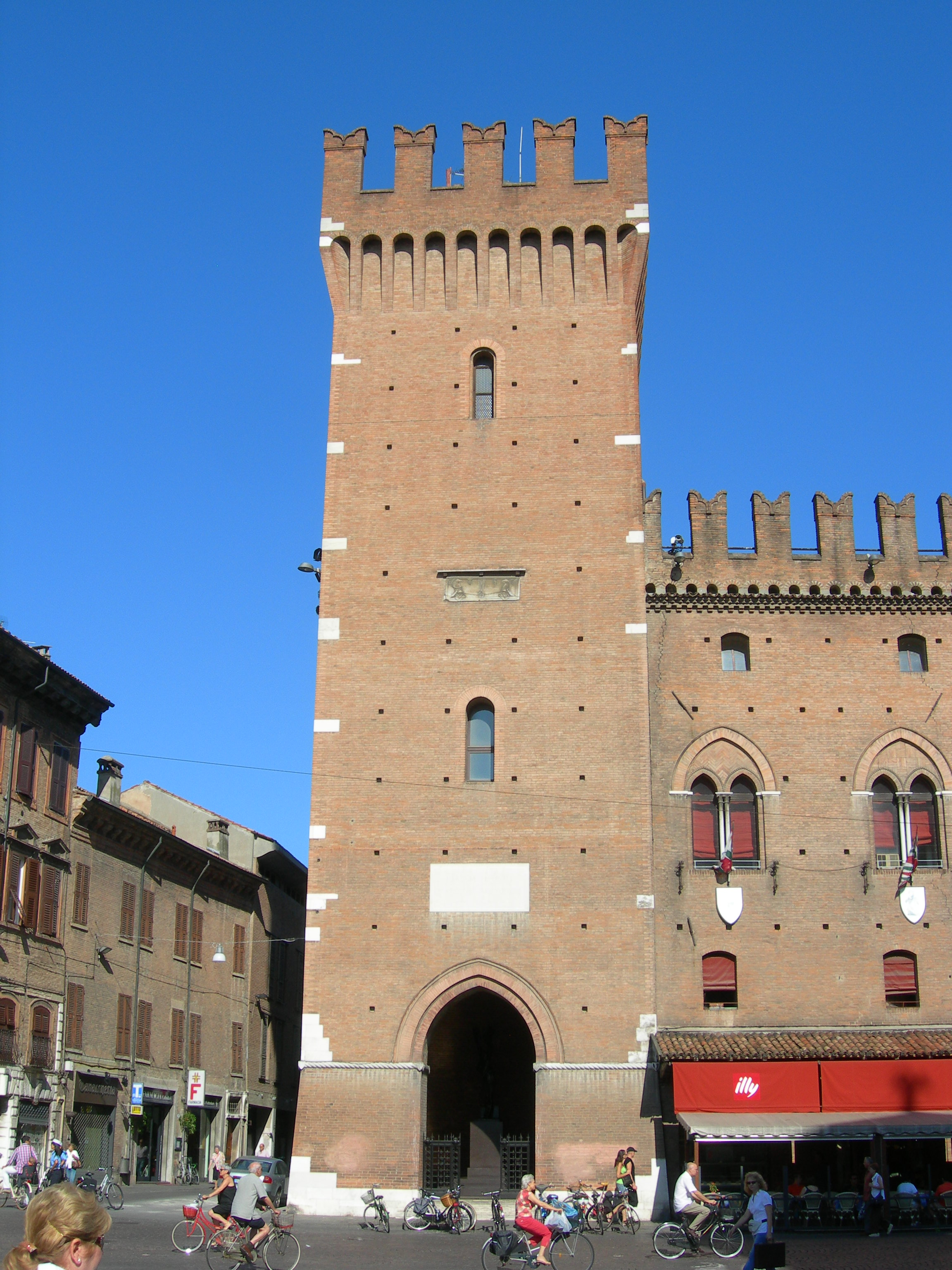
- Torre della Vittoria
- Interactive map of Torre della Vittoria
- 44.835696°N 11.618986°E
- Periods: High Middle Ages
- Location: Ferrara, Italy

History
- Built: 1924-1928

Site notes
- Condition: Restored

The Torre della Vittoria is a historical building in Ferrara that adjoins the Palazzo Municipale. It is distinguished by its scale, by the fact that it was rebuilt centuries after the collapse of the earlier tower on the site, and by its association with celebrations portrayed in films of the Fascist-era. It stands at the corner of Piazza Trento e Trieste and Via Cortevecchia, at the beginning of Corso Martiri della Libertà.

== History ==
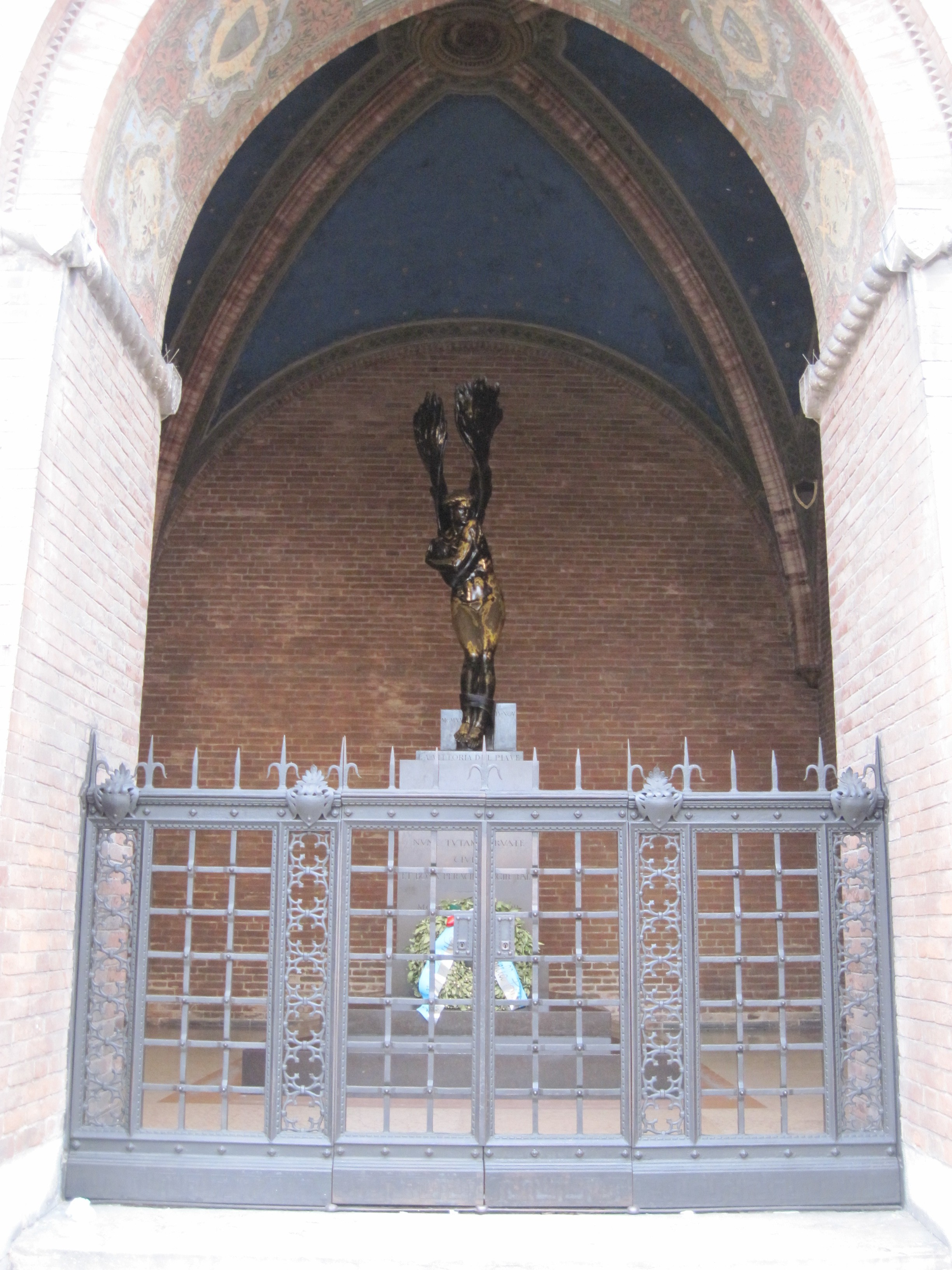
Torre della Vittoria, Loggia della Statua della Vittoria del Piave, by Minerbi

As part of the action aimed at recovering and enhancing the city's building heritage, begun in the early 1920s, in Ferrara, which began with the restoration of two public buildings that are emblems of the city, namely the Castello Estense and the Palazzo Municipale, radical work was carried out on the latter's façade, the one facing the Duomo. In particular, a new Tower of Victory was erected to replace the original one, designed by Rigobello, which had collapsed during the seventeenth century, in 1570, at the beginning of the seismic swarm that struck the city until 1574.

The will of the municipal administration was, at that time, to recover the ancient appearance of the Municipal Palace to recall the glory of the Este period and, in addition, to celebrate Victory in the First World War with a commemorative monument. This was identified in the gilded bronze statue La Vittoria del Piave by Arrigo Minerbi, which was placed at the base of the tower, a copy based on the 1917—1918 model. The decoration of the entrance to the tower was entrusted in 1927 to Giulio Medini, who was also the author of the renovation of the exterior decorations of the Palazzo Municipale.

== The inauguration of the Tower ==
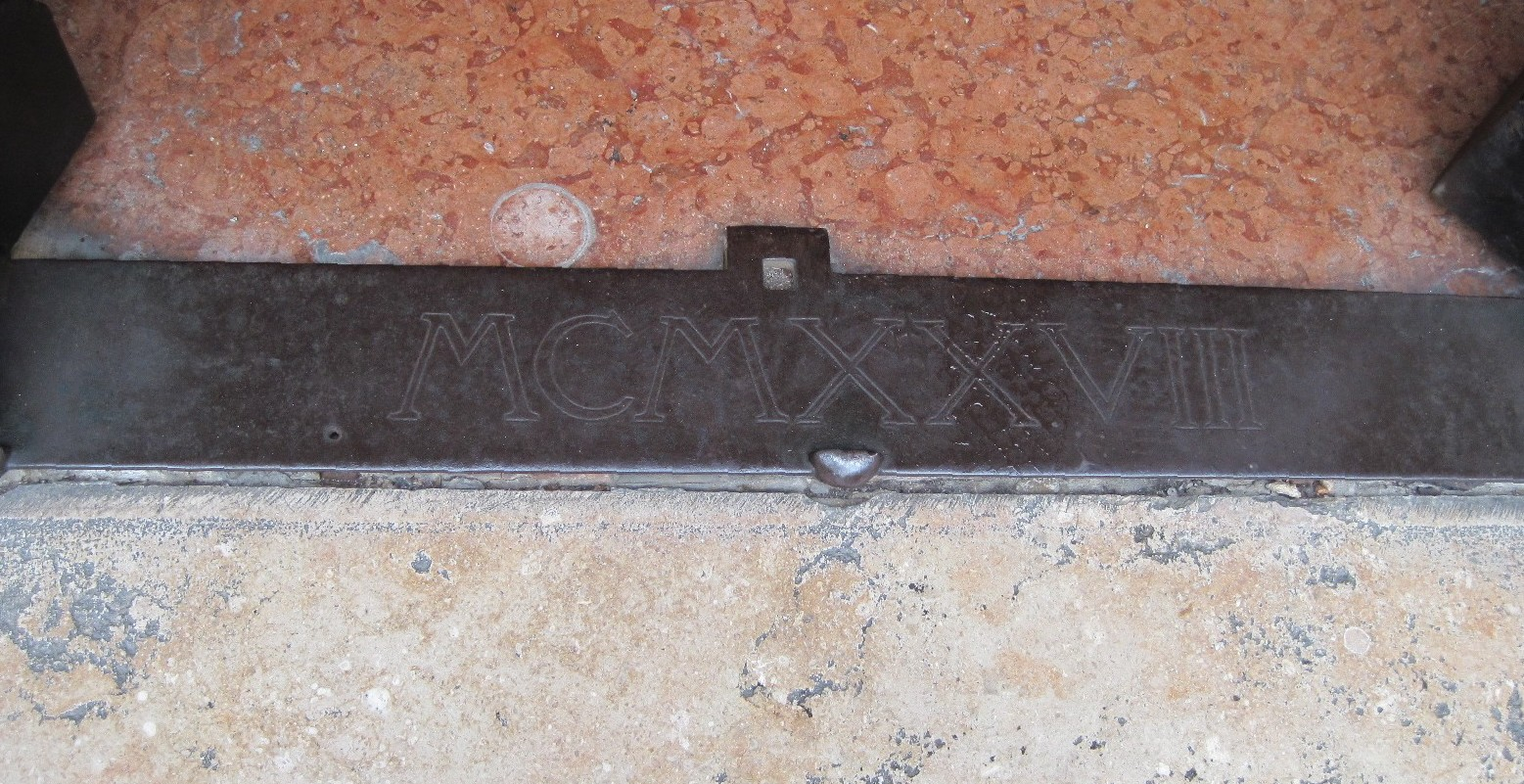
Torre della Vittoria, Entrance loggia of the statue of Victory of Piave, detail

The inauguration of the Tower was an important celebratory moment for Fascism in Ferrara, in November 1928, and for the occasion, in addition to Italo Balbo, Renzo Ravenna and the main civil, military and religious personalities, the king, Vittorio Emanuele III, also took part.

== Architectural Aspects ==
Built on a 14th-century model, in Gothic style and with materials reminiscent of the Este Castle, it is 57 m high and the top is crenellated, like the reconstructed façade of the Town Hall.

== See also ==
- Palazzo Municipale of Ferrara

== Sources ==
=== Italian sources ===
- Ilaria Pavan (2006). Il podestà ebreo. La storia di Renzo Ravenna tra fascismo e leggi razziali. Roma-Bari: Laterza.
- Gerolamo Melchiorri (2009). Nomenclatura ed etimologia delle piazze e strade di Ferrara e Ampliamenti, a cura di Carlo Bassi. Ferrara: 2G.
- Archivio storico del Comune di Ferrara - Ufficio Ricerche Storiche
