= Palio of Ferrara =

Festivals Historic reenactments

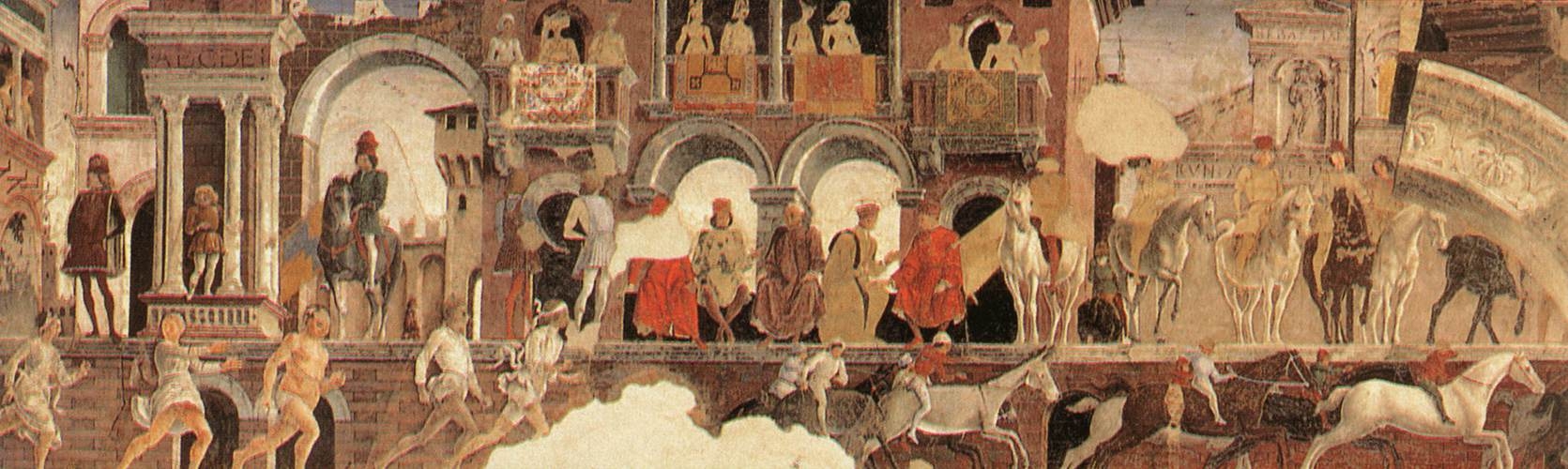
- Francesco del Cossa, Aprile (specifically the palio race), fresco, 1470 circa, Salone dei Mesi (Hall of Months) , Palazzo Schifanoia, Ferrara.
- Frequency: Last Sunday in May
- Location: Piazza Ariostea
- Country: Italy
- Years active: 1259–1600; 1933–1939 since 1967
- Sponsor: Ente Palio di Ferrara
- Website: www.paliodiferrara.it

The Palio of Ferrara is a competition among the 8 neighborhoods (contrade) of the town of Ferrara, Emilia-Romagna, Italy. Four of these neighborhoods correspond to four wards located inside the medieval town fortifications. The remaining four correspond to external boroughs. The Palio is an historical reenactment based on 1259 celebrations for the return from Rome of Borso d'Este after receiving the duchy investiture from Pope Paul II. The celebrations were repeated regularly until around 1600. After a long interruption the tradition was briefly reenacted in 1933, stopped again during World War II and eventually restarted in 1967.
