= Palazzo di San Crispino =

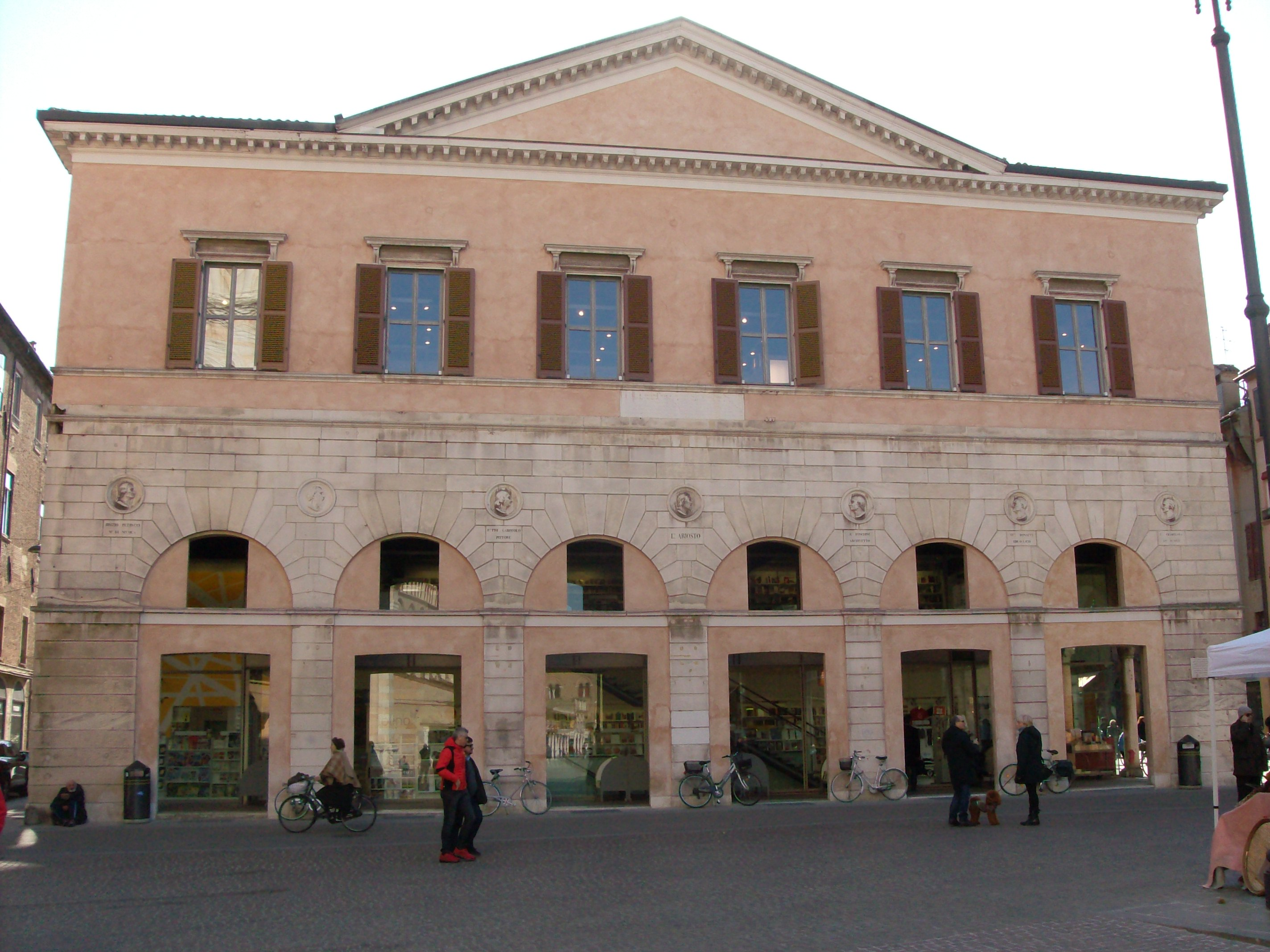
- Facade of the San Crispino Palace
- Interactive map of the Palazzo di San Crispino area

General information
- Status: In use
- Type: Palace
- Architectural style: Neoclassical architecture
- Location: Ferrara, Italy, Piazza Trento e Trieste
- Coordinates: 44.834832°N 11.621234°E
- Current tenants: Bookshop
- Construction started: 15th century
- Renovated: 19th century

The palazzo di San Crispino, also known as the oratorio dei calzolai o di San Crispino, is located in Piazza Trento e Trieste, on the corner of via Mazzini and via Contrari in Ferrara.

== History ==
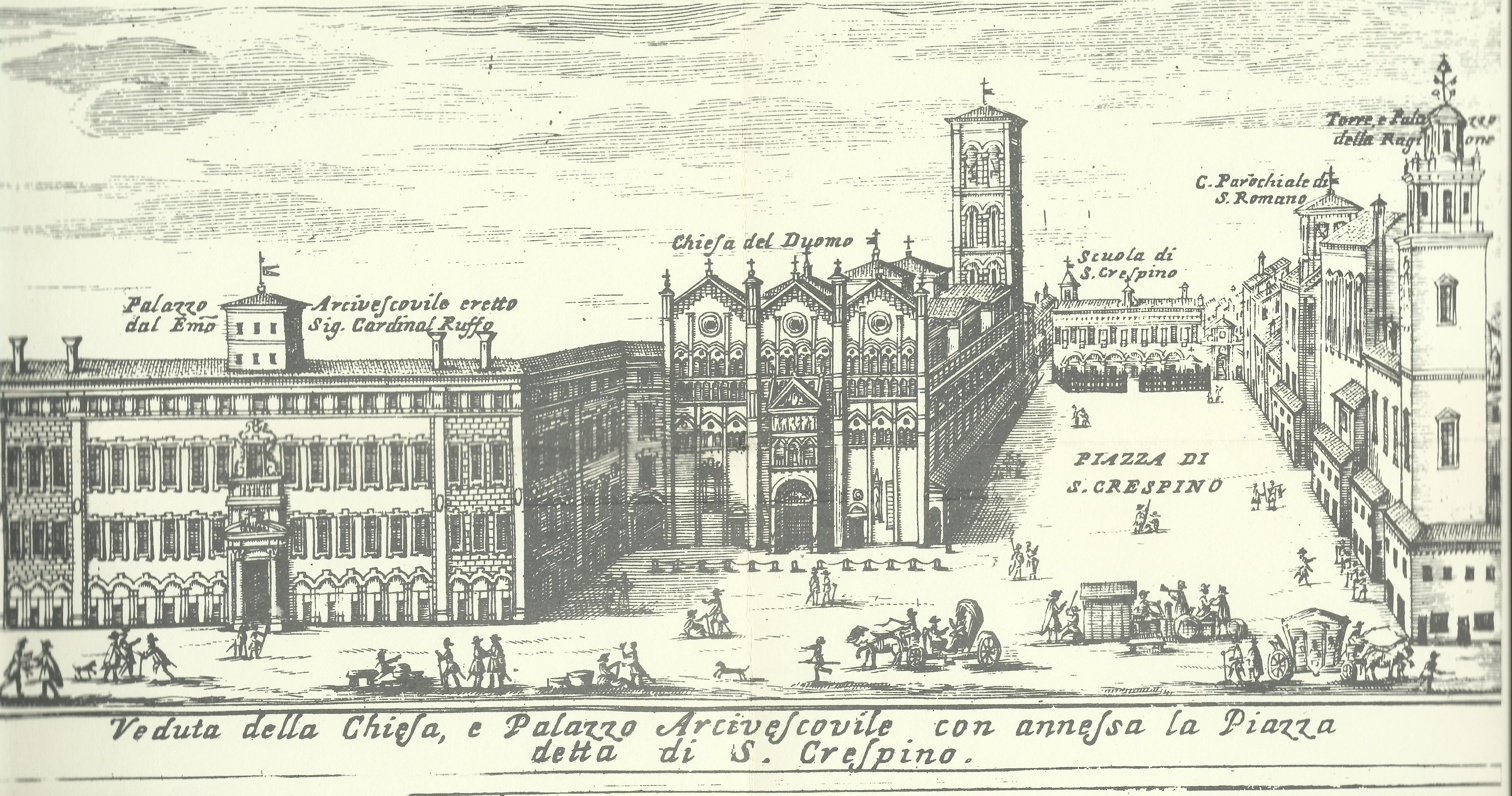
Piazza Trento e Trieste with the oratory of San Crispino, from an engraving by Andrea Bolzoni of 1747.

Popular tradition would have it that Charlemagne on his passage through Ferrara dedicated it to the art of shoemaking in 808 as a reward to a shoemaker for the services he had offered him. Historically speaking, it is certain that until 1561 it was the seat of public schools of fine arts, linked to the Studium of Ferrara, later partially destroyed by fire. Later, by decision of the shoemakers' guild, it was reduced to an oratory, while the public school from 1567 was moved to the new location of the Palazzo Paradiso.

The oratory was dedicated to the saints Crispinus and Crispinianus and this name has remained, even being used for a time to indicate the square on which it stands. According to tradition, Crispinus and Crispinianus were two young Christians sent from Rome as missionaries who were shoemakers by trade. During the period of the persecution of Christians in the Roman Empire they were urged to deny their faith but, not accepting it, the emperor Maximian condemned them to death. Their bodies were then hidden and preserved by some believers until the end of the persecutions. Deposited in two neighbouring sepulchres, the two saints would later be buried and the basilica dedicated to them in Soissons was built on their tomb. They are credited with the name that was chosen for the building, thus dedicated to the protectors of shoemakers.

=== Ghetto period ===
When the ghetto was established in Ferrara, starting in 1627, in its premises the Jews were required to take part in predica obbligatorie.

== Restoration ==
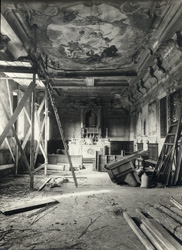
Interior of the San Crispino Palace after the fire

During the 19th century, the palace underwent major renovation by architect Giovanni Tosi, who transformed the previous historical loggia, giving it a neoclassical appearance that it still retains, and arranged some shops inside.

In the middle of the 1970s, work began to restore the ancient portico, but the operation was suspended after a short time due to various difficulties related to the property, although in the meantime the 18th-century pictorial and decorative elements were recovered, by Giuseppe Facchinetti and Francesco Pellegrini. Both painters around 1750 depicted the Glory of Saints Crispinus and Crispinianus in the vault of the hall. Despite various changes of ownership a 16th-century wooden ceiling in the loggia and the remains of medieval workshops on the back wall were preserved.

Work resumed at a later date after interruptions due to legal issues. The Regional Administrative Court in 1985 decided to award the building to the public authority, but the ruling was annulled shortly afterwards as illegitimate. The private property sent a plan for the allocation of the space and at ministerial level the response only arrived in 1988.

=== Description ===
In 1675 the façade was frescoed (but such work was lost in the 19th century), above the loggia, by Francesco Ferrari, who depicted Charlemagne on a throne flanked by paladins on horseback.

Architect Tosi wanted to embellish the façade with large medallions representing civic virtues, in line with other decorations in the city. Together with Gaetano Davia, he therefore chose a number of illustrious men from Ferrara to be celebrated: Ludovico Ariosto was placed in the centre and Brizio Petrucci, Alfonso Lombardi, Benvenuto Tisi da Garofalo, Antonio Foschini, Teodoro Bonati and Leopoldo Cicognara were placed on the sides.

A partire dalla fine del XX secolo, il palazzo ospita una libreria.

== Bibliography ==
=== Italian sources ===
- Gerolamo Melchiorri, Nomenclatura ed etimologia delle piazze e strade di Ferrara e Ampliamenti, a cura di Carlo Bassi, Ferrara, 2G Editrice, 2009, ISBN 978-8889248218.
- Letizia Caselli, La loggia di S. Crispino: un ginepraio di progetti, in Bollettino Ferrariae Decus, n. 1, 30 aprile 1992, pp. 13–14.
- Lucio Scardino e Antonio P. Torresi, Post Mortem – Disegni, decorazioni e sculture per la Certosa ottocentesca di Ferrara, Ferrara, Liberty house, 1998, p. 169.
- Lucio Scardino, I medaglioni del palazzo di San Crispino, in Bollettino della Ferrariae Decus, n. 21, 31 dicembre 2004, pp. 59–63.
- L. S. (Lucio Scardino), Aggiunte su Gaetano Davia, in Bollettino della Ferrariae Decus, n. 22, 31 dicembre 2005, pp. 95–101.
