= Luigi Zappelli =

Italian politician

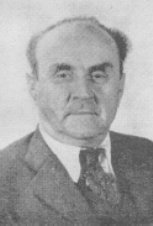
Luigi Zappelli in 1948

Luigi Zappelli (1 January 1886 – 9 August 1948) was an Italian politician who served as Mayor of Verbania (1946–1948), member of the Constituent Assembly (1946–1948) and Deputy (1948).
