= Museo Giovanni Boldini =

Art museum in Ferrara

Coordinates: 44°50′31″N 11°37′29″E

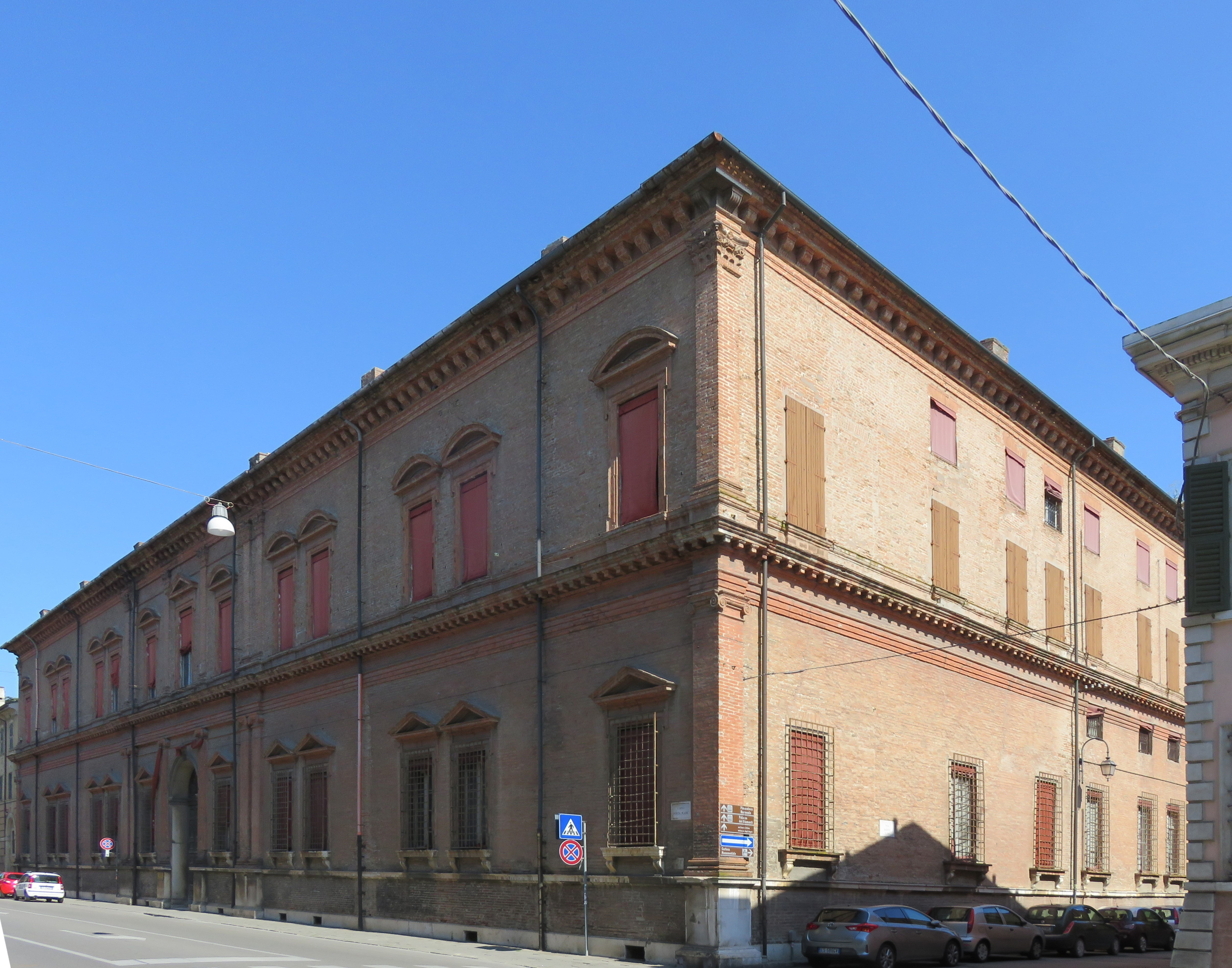
Museo Giovanni Boldini in the Palazzo Massari, in Ferrara

The Museo Giovanni Boldini is a biographical museum, located in the Palazzo Massari, in Ferrara, dedicated to Italian painter Giovanni Boldini. It is one of the three museums located in the palace, being the others the Museo dell'Ottocento and the Museo d'arte moderna e contemporanea Filippo de Pisis. The current museum has been closed for restoration work since the 2012 Northern Italy earthquakes.

== History ==
The museum was inaugurated during the fascist regimen on 20 October 1935 as part of the urban redevelopment of the city and the cultural rebirth of the ancient Estense capital has been defended by Renzo Ravenna, the mayor from 1926 to 1938, and by Italo Balbo's closest collaborators, including the journalist Nello Quilici. Its first location was in the Palazzo dei Diamanti, but later the collection was transferred to the Palazzo Massari.

Giovanni Boldini, born in Ferrara, was one of the best portraitists of European high society of the 19th century and early 20th century. A notable collection of his works, donated by the artist's widow, is located in the halls of the main floor of the palace, together with many drawings, studies and personal objects of the painter. Boldini, although had settled in Paris, was buried in his city of origin.

== Exhibition rooms ==
The museum begins with the baroque chapel of the palace, located beyond the large Festival Hall, then it encompasses three small rooms with early works by the painter, including a Self-Portrait and the oil Two White Horses.

In the fourth room, a sumptuous frescoed environment of vast proportions, five large paintings are exhibited which testify to Boldini's mastery, including the portraits of the Countess Gabrielle del Rasty, and the Infanta Eulalia of Spain, all executed between 1878 and 1891.

After this room there are two rooms without paintings: a long corridor entirely painted with medallions and fake sculptures and a sumptuous rococo living room decorated with white and gold stuccos. The Boldini collection then resumes with drawings and watercolours.

The last room is dominated by the painting The Walk in the Bois. The subsequent rooms contain numerous pictorial studies and personal objects of the artist, including the box of paints and brushes, and the famous painting Lady in Pink.
