= Firework (video game) =

2021 video game

- Developer: Shiying Studio
- Publisher: Gamera Game
- Producer: Moonlight Cockroach
- Composer: wushuicusuantong
- Platform: Microsoft Windows
- Release: February 14, 2021
- Genres: Horror, Puzzle
- Mode: Single-player

Firework (Chinese: 烟火; pinyin: Yānhuǒ) is a horror puzzle game developed by Chinese studio "Moonlight Cockroach" and published by Gamera Game . The trial version was released on July 15, 2020, and was officially released on the Steam platform on February 4, 2021. Players will play the role of criminal policeman Lin Lixun, investigating a funeral arson case in a mountain town, and another family massacre involved in it.

== Gameplay ==
In the game, players will control the detective Lin Lixun from a third-person perspective, and uncover the truth behind the tragedy and the inner stories of each character through exploration in different scenes. During the game, players will encounter a variety of puzzles, and there will also be plot characters joining in to help you get more information. Gradually understand the beginning and end of the story in each scene, and piece together the original appearance of the event with fragments.

Firework features simple controls centered around 2D side-scrolling exploration and click-based interactions. Players move the character with Arrow keys and use an interaction button to examine objects, solve puzzles, or trigger story events. A "spiritual perspective" mechanic allows switching to a supernatural realm to uncover hidden clues. The game eliminates combat and complex mechanics, relying on highlighted prompts and auto-saves to lower barriers, letting players fully immerse in puzzle-solving and narrative. The pacing follows Linear narrative with chapter-based progression, blending suspenseful design—core puzzles every 20–30 minutes, environmental exploration, and story flashbacks. Over its 4-6 hour playtime, alternating tense scenes and slow character movement (enforcing observation) maintain tension while deepening immersion

== Characters ==
=== Lin Lixun ===
The protagonist, a young and upright rookie police officer with a hint of naivety. He arrives in the village to investigate the case and possesses a "spiritual mediumship" ability, allowing him to perceive the memories of the deceased by touching objects. This power helps him gradually uncover the truth behind the incident.

=== Chen Qingsui ===
A newspaper reporter who infiltrates the village to investigate its hidden secrets. She is calm, intelligent, and collaborates with Lin Lixun to advance the investigation. However, she herself harbors personal secrets tied to the village.

=== Zhao Xiaojuan ===
A pivotal figure in the case, the daughter-in-law of the Tian family. Oppressed by her family’s feudal superstitions, she becomes trapped in tragedy. Her character embodies resilience but ultimately falls victim to the village’s archaic customs.

=== Tian Fangfang ===
Zhao Xiaojuan’s daughter, a cheerful elementary school student. Her accidental death serves as the catalyst for the case. The game reveals the twisted yet tender dynamics of her family through her diaries and memories.

=== Ye Jingshan ===
The village doctor, outwardly gentle but with a complex identity. Though seemingly unrelated to the case, he carries a heavy past and holds key clues to unraveling the mystery.

== Development ==
"Firework" is led by the domestic independent developer "Moonlight Cockroach", whose studio "Shiying Studio" has only one person. Moonlight Cockroach was originally a UI designer, but later resigned to devote himself to independent game development. He had previously launched "Tales of the Black Forest", a Japanese-style ghost story theme. Inspired by social mystery novels and Chinese folk culture, he decided to transform and create "Firework", a local horror suspense theme. The development took 1 year and 4 months.The funds came from the sales revenue of the previous work "Black Forest Town Tale" (about 20,000 copies sold)

Due to the shift to Chinese horror style, watercolor style scenes were redesigned, and red and green color matching, funeral elements and other oriental horror symbols were incorporated. The visual style of the classic Hong Kong horror film "The Imp " was referenced during the development process. Influenced by the game "What Remains of Edith Finch", Moonlight tried a narrative from multiple character perspectives for the first time, using different art styles to create a blurred boundary between fantasy and reality.

In the game script, collaborator Yszk describes this local flavor as "nostalgia for one's homeland" and an "earthly vibrancy" tied to personal lived experiences. Even elements designed to provoke lingering fear maintain a dual nature – one end tethered to terror, the other anchored in childhood memories, traditions, and the fading traces of bygone lifestyles and era-defining characteristics. When these opposing ends of the rope become entwined, the resulting emotional resonance forms a peculiar bond, awakening "a subtle understanding shared among Chinese people."

== Release ==
First launched on Steam: February 4, 2021 (Chinese version).

English version updated: December 13, 2021, supporting global players to experience.

Xbox Game Pass (XGP): Join the subscription library in June 2024, players can play directly through XGP

== Film and TV adaptation ==
Start time: September 2021

Beijing Five Pictures Media Co.Ltd is responsible for the production, and plans to be faithful to the core plot of the original work and develop a film and TV series.

The specific release date has not yet been announced, but the official said that the script is being polished, and the producer Moonlight Cockroach is involved in the supervision.

== Response and evaluation ==
In the first year of the Chinese version on Steam, sales exceeded 300,000 copies, with sales reaching RMB 8.8 million（About 1.21 million dollars）. As of 2024, the cumulative sales on Steam exceeded 380,000 copies, and the positive review rate remained at 98% for a long time (more than 38,000 reviews)

Steam reviews in English called it a "narrative-driven masterpiece" and said that "even if you don't understand Chinese, the scene design and music are enough to convey the depth and beauty of the story."

However, it has received some criticism due to poor English translation, Culture gap, and immature technology.

Due to the popularity of the game, some criminals have used pseudonyms as game characters, fabricated tragic stories under the pretext of the game plot to deceive others' sympathy, and then asked for commissions. The victims involved include painters, voice actors, etc. as many as dozens of people. The official made a statement and response in a timely manner, and the account involved was subsequently banned.
