= Venuto =

Venuto is a surname. Notable people with the surname include:

- Michael Di Venuto (born 1973), Australia cricketer
- Sam Venuto (born 1927), former American football running back

== See also ==
- Venuta
- Venuti
- Benvenuto (disambiguation)
- Benvenuta (disambiguation)
