= Benvegnù =

Benvegnù is an Italian surname from Veneto, derived from a given name meaning 'Welcome'. Notable people with the surname include:

- Benoît Benvegnu (born 1985), French football goalkeeper
- Paolo Benvegnù (1965–2024), Italian singer-songwriter

== See also ==
- Benvenuti
- Benvenuto
