= Benevenuto =

Benevenuto may refer to:

- Benevenuto (footballer) (1904–1949), Humberto de Araújo Benvenuto, Brazilian football defender
- Benevenuto Nunes (1913–?), Benevenuto Martins Nuñes, Brazilian Olympic swimmer
- Marcelo Benevenuto (born 1996), Brazilian footballer

== See also ==
- Benvenuto (disambiguation)
- Benevento
