= Giovanni Benvenuti (disambiguation) =

Gianni Benvenuti (1926–2005) was an Italian painter, illustrator, sculptor, printmaker; often referred to as simply "Benvenutti".

Giovanni Benvenuti may also refer to:

- Giovanni Battista Benvenuti, birth name of Ortolano (born c 1480), Italian Renaissance painter
- Giovanni Benvenuti, birth name of Nino Benvenuti (born 1938), Italian former boxer
