= Auditorium Conciliazione =

Concert hall in Rome, Italy

Coordinates: 41°54′10.0″N 12°27′49.1″E

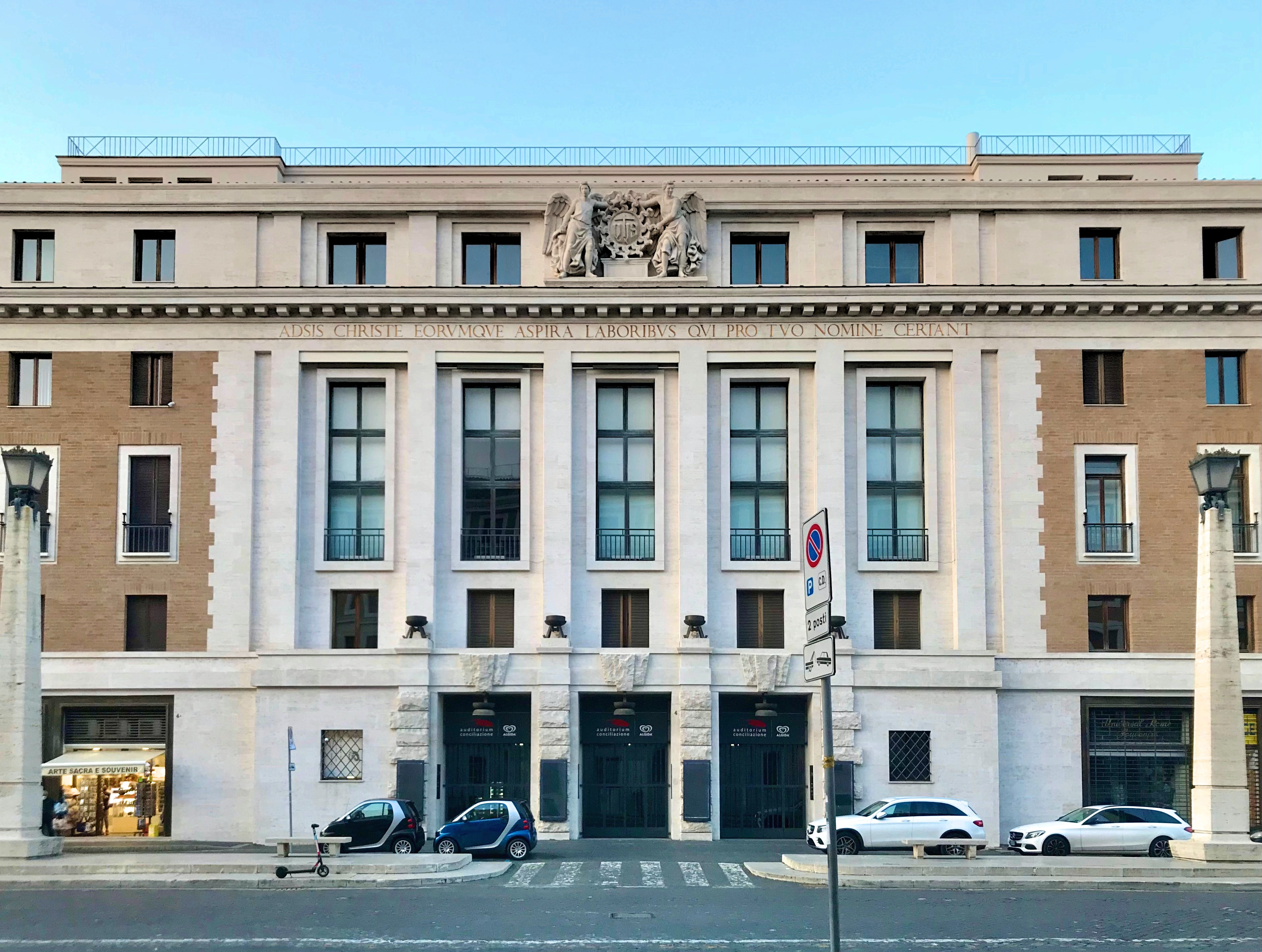
- Facade of the auditorium on Via della Conciliazione
- Interactive map of Auditorium Conciliazione
- Address: Via della Conciliazione, 4 Rome; Italy

Construction
- Opened: 1950
- Architects: Marcello Piacentini and Giorgio Calza Bini

Website
- www.auditoriumconciliazione.it

Auditorium della Conciliazione, also known as Auditorio Pio, is an audience hall and concert hall on the Via della Conciliazione in the Borgo district of Rome. Conceived in the 1930s as part of a vast Mussolini-ordered redevelopment of the district, it was not completed until 1950 after post-World War II work by architects Marcello Piacentini and Giorgio Calza Bini. Surrounding it are wings of the large Palazzo San Pio X, a broadcasting facility also part of the 1930s conception. Both buildings open onto the long perspective from St. Peter's Basilica to the Ponte Sant'Angelo created by the redevelopment.

The venue's role as a pontifical audience hall began when it was inaugurated by Pope Pius XII. But in 1971 it was replaced in this role by the new Paolo VI Audience Hall. As a concert hall it served from 1958 to 2000 as the performing home of Rome's main symphony orchestra, the Orchestra dell' Accademia Nazionale di Santa Cecilia, and in February 2001 it hosted a unique week-long filmed residency by the Berlin Philharmonic and Claudio Abbado. When the Santa Cecilia orchestra too moved away, the building underwent a lengthy refurbishment before reopening on April 29, 2005, with the ceremony of the David de Donatello Awards presented by l'Accademia del Cinema Italiano. The Auditorium hosted the only edition of the event TEDxViaDellaConciliazone, dedicated to the dialogue between different religions.
