= Benvenuti =

Benvenuti is an Italian surname meaning "welcome". Notable people with the surname include:

- Andrea Benvenuti (born 1969), Italian Olympic runner
- Augusto Benvenuti (1839–1899), Italian sculptor
- Beatrice Benvenuti (born 1993), Italian rugby referee
- Gianni Benvenuti (1926–2005), Italian artist, often referred to as "Benvenuti"
- Nino Benvenuti (1938–2025), Italian professional boxer
- Pietro Benvenuti (1769–1844), Italian academic painter
- Tomaso Benvenuti (1838–1906), Italian opera composer
- Tommaso Benvenuti (rugby union) (born 1990), Italian rugby player
