= Federico Oliva (architect) =

Italian architect and urban planner

- Born: 21 June 1945; Viggiù, Province of Varese, Italy
- Died: 8 September 2018 (aged 73); Milos, Greece
- Education: Polytechnic University of Milan
- Occupations: Architect, urban planner, academic

Federico Oliva (21 June 1945 – 8 September 2018) was an Italian architect, urban planner and academic. He was professor of urban planning at the Polytechnic University of Milan, and president of the Istituto Nazionale di Urbanistica (INU) from 2005 to 2013.

== Life and career ==
Oliva was born in Viggiù, in the province of Varese. He graduated in architecture from the Polytechnic University of Milan in 1969, where he later became professor of urban planning at the Faculty of Architecture and Society. He was also president of the master's degree course in Urban Planning and Territorial Policies.

His professional activity focused mainly on urban planning and territorial development. He was involved in numerous urban and territorial plans, including the master plans of Pavia, Ancona, Reggio Emilia, Piacenza, Rome, La Spezia, and Cuneo, as well as territorial coordination plans for several Italian provinces, including Pesaro and Urbino, Perugia, and Forlì-Cesena.

In 2005, he became president of the Istituto Nazionale di Urbanistica, serving until 2013. In 2014, he became director of the journal Urbanistica.

Oliva died in the Greek island of Milos on 8 September 2018.

== Works (selection) ==
- Pavia master plan (1974–1976)
- Ancona master plan (1983–1988)
- Reggio Emilia master plan (1992–1999)
- Territorial coordination plan for the Province of Pesaro and Urbino (1994–1998)
- Piacenza master plan (1995–1997)
- Territorial coordination plan for the Province of Perugia (1995–1999)
- Rome master plan (1996–2003, with Giuseppe Campos Venuti)
- La Spezia master plan (1996–2003)
- Territorial coordination plan for the Province of Forlì-Cesena (1997–2000)
- Ivrea master plan (1999–2004)
- Cuneo master plan (1999–2003)
- Territorial coordination plan for the Province of Piacenza (2004)

== Publications ==
- Oliva, Federico (1993). Cinquant'anni di urbanistica in Italia 1942–1992. Rome–Bari: Laterza.
- Oliva, Federico (1996). La riforma urbanistica in Italia. Milan: Pirola–Il Sole 24 Ore.
- Oliva, Federico; Galuzzi, Paolo; Vitillo, Piergiorgio (2002). Progettazione urbanistica: materiali e riferimenti per la costruzione del piano comunale. Rimini: Maggioli Editore.
- Oliva, Federico (2002). L'urbanistica di Milano: quel che resta dei piani urbanistici nella crescita e nella trasformazione della città. Milan: Hoepli.
- Campos Venuti, Giuseppe; Oliva, Federico (2014). Città senza cultura: Intervista sull'urbanistica. Rome–Bari: Laterza.
