= Palazzo Schifanoia =

Coordinates: 44.831°N 11.629°E

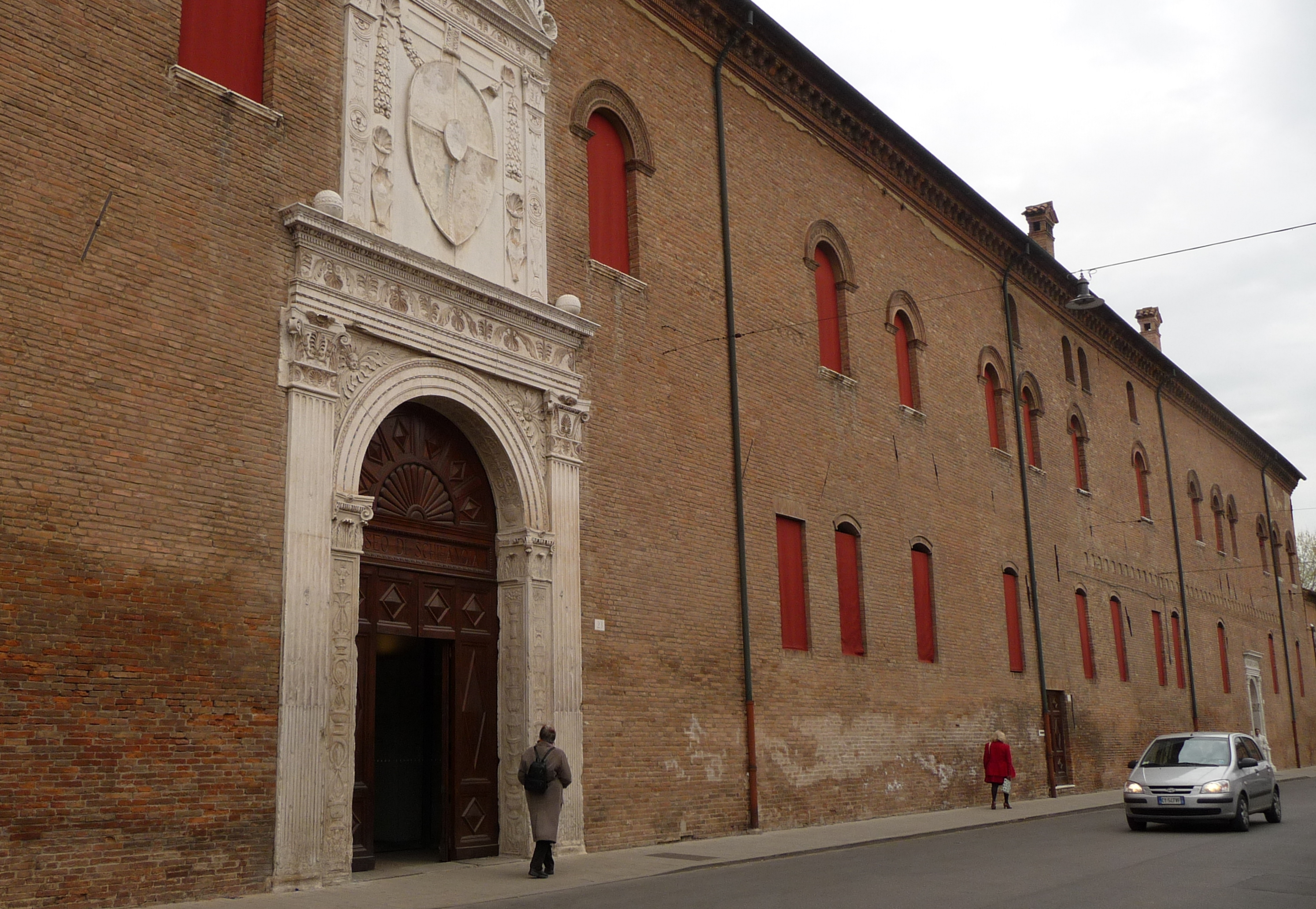
- Main entrance
- Interactive map of the Palazzo Schifanoia area

General information
- Location: Ferrara, Italy, Via Scandiana, 23
- Client: House of Este

Other information
- Facilities: museum

Website
- www.artecultura.fe.it/159/museo-schifanoia

Palazzo Schifanoia is a Renaissance palace in Ferrara, Emilia-Romagna (Italy) built for the Este family. The name "Schifanoia" is thought to originate from "schifare la noia" meaning literally to "escape from boredom" which describes accurately the original intention of the palazzo and the other villas in close proximity where the Este court relaxed. The highlights of its decorations are the allegorical frescoes with details in tempera by or after Francesco del Cossa and Cosmè Tura, executed ca 1469–70, a unique survival of their time.

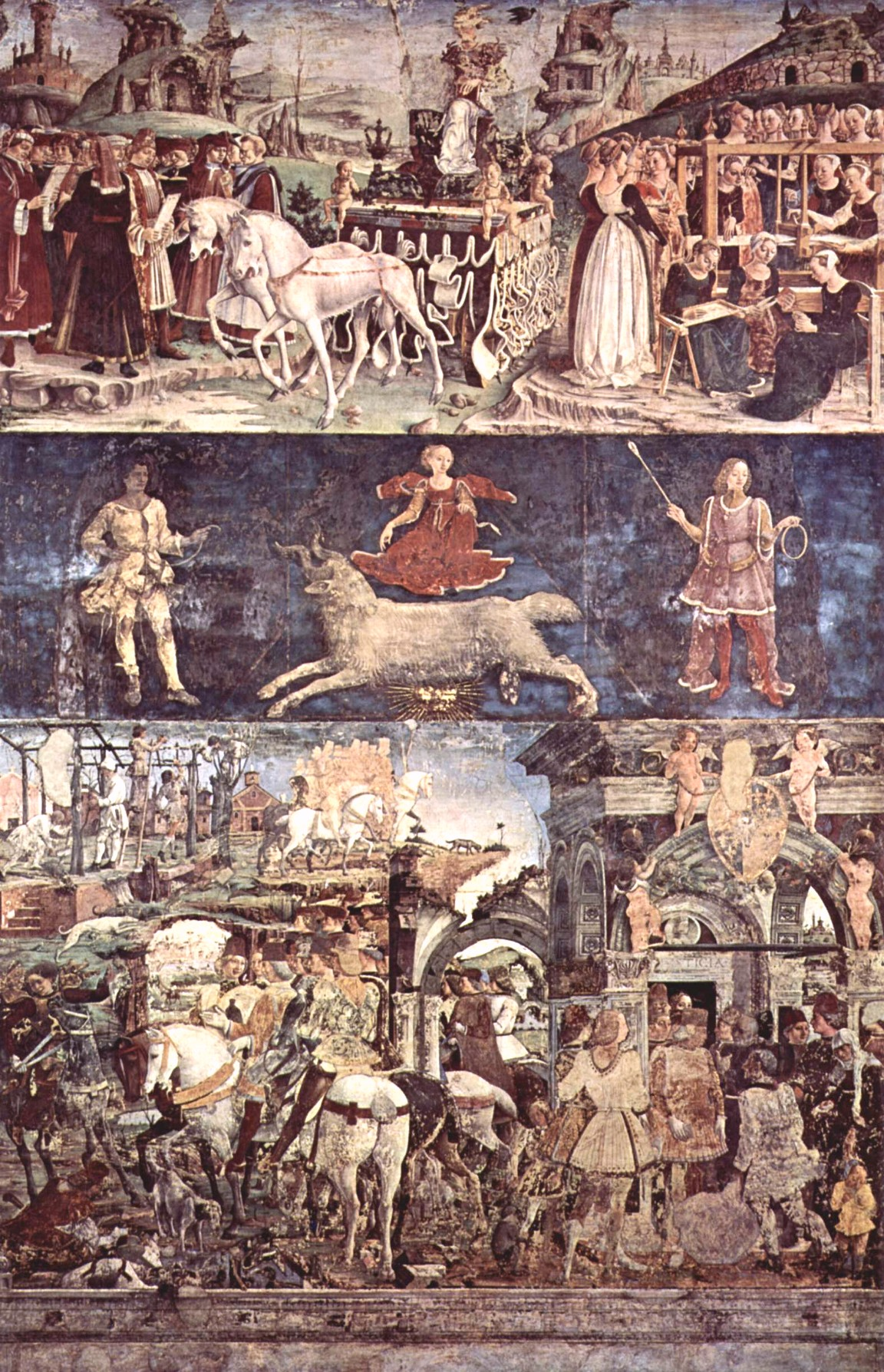
Allegory of March. Francesco del Cossa, Ercole de’ Roberti and Gherardo di Andrea Fiorini. A fresco from the Hall of the Months. Around 1469

This palace forms part of a catalogue of pleasure palaces for the Este family, including the following:

- Delizia di Belriguardo a Voghiera
- Delizia del Verginese a Portomaggiore
- Castello di Mesola a Mesola
- Villa della Mensa a Sabbioncello San Vittore
- Delizia di Benvignante ad Argenta, Italy

The Palace of Belfiore which once held the Studiolo of the Palazzo Belfiore, no longer exists.

== History ==
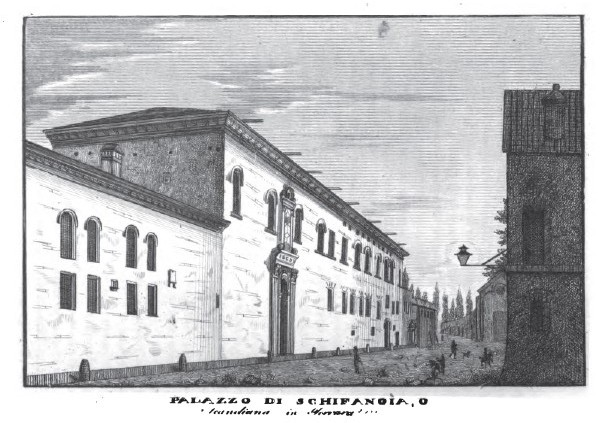
Palazzo Schifanoia in 1838

The palace had its origins in a single-storey structure without wings built for Alberto V d'Este (1385), a small retreat intended solely for suppers and diversions (delizie), as a sort of banqueting house, with an urban front and a garden front. As the equivalent of a Roman villa suburbana, the Palazzo Schifanoia long predated the first such pleasure villa built in Renaissance Rome, the Belvedere built for Nicholas V.

In 1452 Borso d'Este received the title of Duke for the imperial fiefs of Modena and Reggio Emilia that he held from Emperor Frederick III. The occasion for the cycle of frescoes was the expected investiture of Borso d'Este as Duke of Ferrara in 1471 by Pope Paul II. The subtext of the festivities embodied in the fresco cycle is the right ordering of mankind and nature under the good government of the Duke, the guarantor of peace and prosperity in the Este dominions. Under the commissions of Borso d'Este, the architect Pietro Benvenuto degli Ordini was called upon to develop a ducal apartment on an upper level, providing the building with a salone suitable for presentations of ambassadors and delegations, a counterpart of the governing structure of Ferrara housed in the former Palazzo della Ragione, destroyed in World War II. The palace was often used by Marfisa d'Este, a great patron of the arts.

There, in the Salone dei Mesi ("Hall of the Months"), Cosimo Tura's purely pagan cycle of the months presents the cycle of the year as an allegorical pageant with the appropriate Olympian gods presiding on their fanciful cars drawn by the beasts proper to each deity, with appropriate personifications of the constellations of the zodiac. The frescoes were realized circa 1469–70 by artisans of the d'Este household, the larger figures based on cartoons by Cosmé Tura, and the vignettes of the labors of the year and the activities of the Ferrarese court under the benevolent eye of Borso d'Este, flanked by astrological figures to designs by Francesco del Cossa and Ercole de' Roberti. The learned and elaborate scheme of the allegorical presentations must have come from the immediate circle of Borso d'Este, perhaps from the court astrologer, Pellegrino Prisciani, with some details drawn from Boccaccio's Genealogia deorum. These images were mentioned in a lecture by Aby Warburg in 1912, ‘Italian Art and International Astrology in the Palazzo Schifanoia, Ferrara’, to illustrate how visual motifs pass from one culture to another over the centuries.

In the Sala delle Virtù ("Hall of Virtues") nearby, the sculptor Domenico di Paris painted the stucco reliefs in a frieze of putti and symbols of the Cardinal and Theological Virtues, under a painted compartmented ceiling.

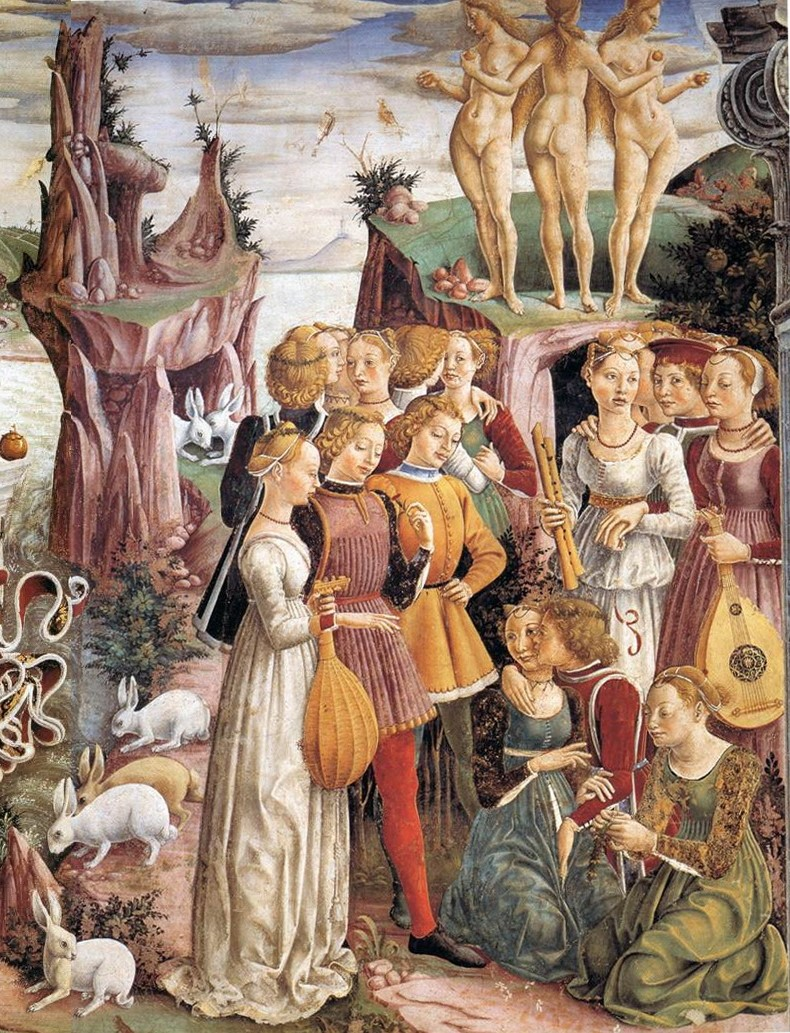
Detail of the Allegory of April. Francesco del Cossa, Ercole de’ Roberti and Gherardo di Andrea Fiorini. A fresco from the Hall of the Months. Around 1469

The façade was originally decorated with a cornice of feigned battlements, its surface smoothly stuccoed and decorated with geometric designs of highly colorful imitation marbles, which have been lost, lending a somewhat dour public face to Palazzo Schifanoia that was not what Borso d'Este intended. The rich white marble entrance door survives, though its tinted colors have weathered away and art historians disagree whether it is to be attributed to the painter-designer Francesco del Cossa or to Biagio Rossetti. Above the arched door, flanked by pilasters, the Este arms are displayed and the unicorn, a symbol of ducal benevolence and the source of patronage. In 1493 the terracotta cornice was added to designs by Biagio Rossetti, who was also commissioned by Ercole I d'Este to extend the palace.

From the Salone dei Mesi the visitor once passed directly into the gardens reached by a monumental stair from the summer loggia, structures that were demolished in the 18th century. After the Este left Ferrara in 1598, the palazzo was inherited through successive heirs, eventually by the Tassoni family, its frescoes whitewashed over. Eventually, during administration of the duchy as part of the Papal States, with a Habsburg garrison, it became a tobacco warehouse and manufactory. When Palazzo Schifanoia came into the possession of the comune of Ferrara in the aftermath of World War I, only seven of the months in the Salone remained legible.

Palazzo Schifanoia forms part of the heritage of Ferrara conserved under the umbrella of the Musei Civici d'Arte Antica di Ferrara. The 14th and 15th century rooms contain collections of antiquities, a numismatic collection and medals cast by Pisanello and other Quattrocento artists to commemorate members of the Este family.
