= Venuti =

Venuti is a surname. Notable people with the surname include:

- Joe Venuti (1903–1978), American jazz violinist
- Giuseppe Campos Venuti (1926–2019), Italian architect and urban planner
- Lawrence Venuti (born 1953), American translator
- Lorenzo Venuti (born 1995), Italian footballer
- Maria Venuti (born 1941), Australian actress, entertainer and author
- Mario Venuti (born 1963), Italian composer
- Ridolfino Venuti (1705–1763), Italian classical archeologist

== See also ==
- Venuta, another surname
- Venuto, another surname
