= Alessandro Tutino =

Italian architect and urban planner (1926–2022)

- Born: 8 August 1926; Milan, Kingdom of Italy
- Died: 15 September 2022 (aged 96); Tregnago, Province of Verona, Italy
- Education: IUAV University of Venice
- Occupations: Architect, urban planner, academic

Alessandro Tutino (8 August 1926 – 15 September 2022) was an Italian architect, urban planner and academic. A leading figure in post-war Italian planning, he served as president of the National Institute of Urban Planning (INU) from 1977 to 1983. He taught at the IUAV University of Venice and later at the University of Calabria, where he directed the Department of Territorial Planning.

His work focused on regional planning, inter-municipal cooperation and the development of Italian urban planning legislation, including early proposals that influenced planning agreements and urban standards.

== Life and career ==
Born in Milan, Tutino joined the Italian Resistance as a teenage volunteer with the partisan brigades in the Aosta Valley during World War II. He was a member of the Italian Communist Party. After the war he studied architecture at the Polytechnic University of Milan before completing his degree at the IUAV University of Venice in 1953.

In the late 1940s, Tutino co-founded the Milan Architecture Collective with a group of young architects and students, including Gae Aulenti and Novella Sansoni. Inspired by the ideas of Franco Marescotti, the collective operated as a cooperative practice focused mainly on public commissions, working on social housing, schools and territorial planning. Active until 1987, it promoted an anti-formalist approach centred on urban management, public services and housing policies.

During the 1960s and 1970s, Tutino was involved in the development of democratic metropolitan planning in northern Italy. He contributed to the Milan Intermunicipal Plan alongside Giancarlo De Carlo and to the Bologna Intermunicipal Plan with Giuseppe Campos Venuti, later working on numerous urban plans in Lombardy and Emilia-Romagna. As president of the Istituto Nazionale di Urbanistica (1977–1983), he promoted debates on land-use reform and defended negotiated planning between public authorities and private actors. His approach influenced the development of urban planning tools such as development charges, urban standards and public works programming, later discussed in his book L'efficacia del piano (1986).

== Selected works ==
- Milan Intermunicipal Plan (1963–1965)
- Bologna Intermunicipal Plan (1963)
- Master plans for Rozzano (1961–1977), Castel Maggiore (1963), Melzo (1970–1978), Cogoleto (1974–1979), and San Donato Milanese (1983–1992)
- Beigua Regional Nature Park planning scheme (1977–1979)
- Verona Adige Park Environmental Plan (2007)

== Selected publications ==
- Secondo schema per il piano intercomunale milanese nel quadro della verifica del modello del 25 luglio 1963 (1965)
- Metodi della pianificazione: metodi della decisione (1985)
- L'efficacia del piano (1986)
- Concordia Sagittaria: un esperimento di piano (1988)
- L'intervento urbanistico nella periferia metropolitana: analisi e proposte per il comune di Rozzano (with Vittorio Erba, 1989)
