= Südstadt (Tübingen) =

Coordinates: 48°30′48″N 9°3′55″E

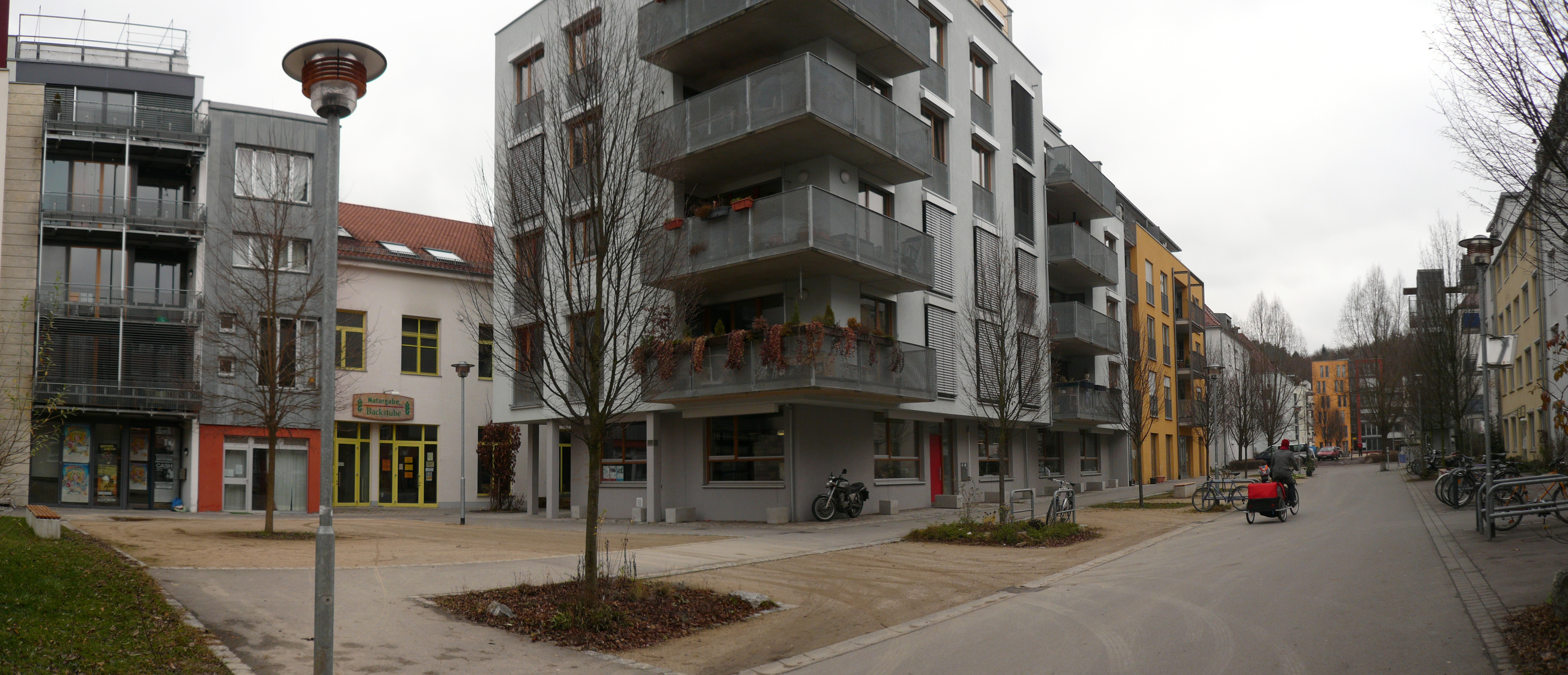
The French Quarter in the Südstadt

Südstadt (German pronunciation: [ˈzyːtˌʃtat], lit. 'south city') is a district of Tübingen, Germany, located south of the city centre. It includes two urban renewal areas, Loretto and the French Quarter, awarded with the European Urban & Regional Planning Award in 2002. Some of its distinct features are that most development lots have been awarded to building partnerships, no land use zoning was used and car parking has been concentrated in three multi-storey automated parking facilities.

== See also ==
- Vauban, Freiburg
