= Paolo Avarello =

- Born: 1948; Rome, Italy
- Died: 17 February 2021 (aged 72–73); Rome, Italy
- Education: Sapienza University of Rome
- Occupations: Urban planner, architect, academic

Paolo Avarello (1948 – 17 February 2021) was an Italian urban planner and academic.

== Life and career ==
Born in Rome in 1948, Avarello graduated in architecture from the Sapienza University in 1972. He began his academic career at the University of Chieti-Pescara. His research focused on urban economics, housing policies, local and regional planning, and urban development policies.

Between 1973 and 1993 he also worked as a professional planner, preparing urban plans, landscape plans and sector plans for several Italian municipalities, including Castelnuovo di Porto, L'Aquila, Atessa, San Giovanni Teatino, Catanzaro, Perano and Giulianova. He also worked on international projects, including the master plan for Constantine, Algeria.

In 1995 he became professor of urban planning at Roma Tre University. He held several positions at Roma Tre, including coordinator of the postgraduate courses, doctoral programmes, and director of the Department of Urban Studies in 2010.

He served as president of the Istituto Nazionale di Urbanistica (INU) from 2001 to 2005, after previously serving as the institute's secretary general (1992–1998). During his presidency he promoted the publication of the Rapporto dal Territorio, expanded INU's research and training activities, and contributed to the creation of Urbanpromo in 2004, an event dedicated to urban transformation projects and public-private partnerships.

Avarello directed the journals Urbanistica informazioni and Urbanistica. He died in Rome in 2021.

== Selected publications ==
- Pescara: contributo per un’analisi urbana (1975)
- Urbanistica, città e piano (1977)
- Urbanistica e mercato edilizio (1982)
- Croissance urbaine et politique foncière: l'expérience italienne (1984)
- Pianificazione del suolo e politica urbanistica (1985)
- La tradizione del piano (1989)
- Una città da ricostruire (1990)
- Le vecchie regole. Cinquant'anni di legge urbanistica 1942-1992 (1993)
- I territori della pianificazione (1994)
- Piano e città nell'esperienza urbanistica (1997)
- Il piano comunale (2000)
- Politiche urbane (2000)
- Roma del Duemila (2000)
- The Medina of Costantine (2009)
- Se esiste l'urbanistica a cosa serve? (2010)
- Paesaggi culturali o cultura del paesaggio (2011)
