= European Council of Spatial Planners =

European umbrella organisation

The European Council of Spatial Planners (ECTP-CEU) is the umbrella organisation for spatial planning institutes in Europe. It was founded in 1985 (when it was called the European Council of Town Planners, hence its initials in English). In June 2014 it had 32 members in 24 European countries. When they join, new member organisations sign an International Agreement on the nature of spatial planning, the responsibilities of planners, common educational standards and a code of conduct. It runs an Awards Scheme every two years, giving prizes for outstanding work in creating attractive places.

Current work of ECTP-CEU includes:

- Dissemination of the Charter of European Planning – a manifesto for planning European cities in the 21st century
- The design of a Vision enhancing the quality and efficiency of cities and urban life in Europe
- The production of a guide to spatial planning and territorial cohesion
- Publishing the proceedings of conferences on European spatial development and the preparation of forthcoming conferences
- Organising the next European Urban and Regional Planning Awards.
- Participation in the organisation of the Biennial of European Towns and Town Planners
- Publishing studies on the Recognition of Planning Qualifications in Europe and proposals on the mutual recognition and mobility of planners across Europe
- Organising workshops for young planners on current urban issues and objectives of the European Union relating to territorial and urban planning

== Members ==
Associate

- (Austria) Bundessektion – Ingenieurkonsulenten / Bundesfachgruppe Raumplanung, Landschaftsplanung und Geographie – bAIK
- (Belgium) Chambre des Urbanistes de Belgique – CUB
- (Belgium) Vlaamse Vereniging voor Ruimte en Planning – VRP
- (Croatia) Association of Croatian Urban Planners – UHU-ACUP
- Cyprus Association of Town Planners – CATP
- (Czech Republic) Asociace pro urbanismus a územní plánování České republiky – AUUP
- (Estonia) Eesti Planeerijate Ühing – EPU
- (France) Société Française des Urbanistes - SFU / Office Professionnel de Qualification des Urbanistes – OPQU
- (Germany) Bundesarchitektenkammer E.V. / Federal Chamber of German Architects – BAK
- (Greece) Association of Greek Urban Planners & Land Planners – SEPOX
- (Hungary) Magyar Urbanisztikai Társaság – MUT
- (Republic of Ireland) Irish Planning Institute – IPI
- (Italy) Associazione Nazionale degli Urbanisti Urbanisti e dei Pianificatori Territoriali e Ambientali – ASSURB
- (Italy) Istituto Nazionale di Urbanistica – INU
- (Malta) Kamra Maltija Ghall-Ippjanar – KMaP
- (Norway) Forum for Kommunale Planlegging – FKP
- (Portugal) Associação Portuguesa de Urbanistas – APU
- (Romania) Registrul Urbaniştilor din Romăniă – RUR
- (Serbia) Udruženje urbanista Srbije – UUS
- (Slovakia) Združenie pre urbanizmus a územné plánovanie na Slovensku – ZUUPS
- (Slovenia) Društvo Urbanistov in Prostorskih Planerjev Slovenije – DUPPS
- (Spain) Asociación Española de Técnicos Urbanistas – AETU
- (United Kingdom) Royal Town Planning Institute – RTPI
- (Poland) Towarzystwo Urbanistów Polskich – TUP

Corresponding

- (Albania) National Territorial Planning Agency – NTPA
- (Spain) Consejo Superior de los Colegios de Arquitectos de España – UAAU
- (Germany) Vereinigung für Stadt-, Regional- und Landesplanung – SRL
- (Republic of Ireland) Downey Planning
- (Republic of Ireland) KPMG Future Analytics
- (North Macedonia) Association of Architects of Macedonia – AAM
- (Poland) University of Gdańsk – Faculty of Architecture
- (Serbia) University of Belgrade – Faculty of Architecture

== Executive Committee Members ==
Autumn 2023 – Autumn 2025

- President: Markus Hedorfer (IT)
- Vice-President: Janet Askew (UK)
- Secretary-General: Henk van der Kamp (IE)
- Treasurer: Gerhard Vittinghoff (AT)
- Administrators: Martin Baloga (SK), Chantal Guillet (FR), Kent Håkull (NO), Catherine Vilquin (BE)

Autumn 2022 – Autumn 2023

- President: Janet Askew (UK)
- Vice-President: Markus Hedorfer (IT)
- Secretary-General: Henk van der Kamp (IE)
- Treasurer: Gerhard Vittinghoff (AT)
- Administrators: Martin Baloga (SK), Chantal Guillet (FR), Kent Håkull (NO), Catherine Vilquin (BE)

Autumn 2021 – Autumn 2022

- President: Janet Askew (UK)
- Vice-President: Markus Hedorfer (IT)
- Secretary-General: Chantal Guillet (FR)
- Treasurer: Gerhard Vittinghoff (AT)
- Administrators: Martin Baloga (SK), Vladan Đokić (RS, resigned on 20/12/2021), Kent Håkull (NO), Catherine Vilquin (BE)

Autumn 2019 – Autumn 2021

- President / Treasurer: Michael Stein (DE)
- Vice-President: Janet Askew (UK)
- Secretary-General: Joris Scheers (BE)
- Administrators: Vladan Đokić (RS), Chantal Guillet (FR), Rachel Ivers (IE, resigned on 22/02/2021)

Autumn 2017 – Autumn 2019

- President: Ignacio Pemán (ES)
- Vice-President / Treasurer: Michael Stein (DE)
- Secretary-General: Joris Scheers (BE)
- Administrators: Janet Askew (UK), Vladan Đokić (RS), Henk van der Kamp (IE)

Autumn 2015 – Autumn 2017

- President: Joris Scheers (BE)
- Vice-President: Henk van der Kamp (IE)
- Secretary-General: Dominique Lancrenon (FR)
- Treasurer: Michael Stein (DE)
- Administrators: Vincent Goodstadt (UK), Ignacio Pemán (ES), João Teixeira (PT)

Autumn 2013 – Autumn 2015

- President: Henk van der Kamp (IE)
- Vice-President: Joris Scheers (BE)
- Secretary-General: Dominique Lancrenon (FR)
- Treasurer: Michael Stein (DE)
- Administrators: Vincent Goodstadt (UK), Ignacio Pemán (ES), João Teixeira (PT)

== Awards ==
The European Urban & Regional Planning Awards were inaugurated in 1990 by the former European Council of Town Planners (ECTP) supported by the European Commission. The biennial awards have the stated objectives to:

- demonstrate successful and innovative planning projects and developments which improve the quality of life of European citizens
- promote the ECTP-CEU Vision of the future of European cities and regions – a way to create and enhance conditions favourable to sustainable development.
- illustrate the diversity and wide scope of planning activity
- demonstrate the advantages of participation in the planning process, facilitated and enabled by professional planners
- the concept of "territorial cohesion"
- explain how stakeholders in spatial development formulate joint strategies to tackle problems in an inter-connected world.

Recipients:

- 1991 1st Planning Awards
  - Citizen participation in urban planning at Solingen, Germany, (Urban Planning)
  - The West Forest Park Project, Denmark, Danish Forest and Nature Agency (Rural Planning)
  - The Development and Planning between France and Geneva, Haute-Savoie (Cross-Border Planning)
  - Programma Risorgive Storga, Italy, Provincia di Treviso (Special Award: Best Planning Document)
  - Barcelona 2000, Spain, Barcelona City Council (Community’s Special Award: Strategic City Planning in a European context)
- 1994 2nd Planning Awards
  - Rehabilitation of the Matera historical site and the facing Murgia high plateau, Italy (Urban Planning)
  - The Lancashire Green Audit, the Lancashire Environmental Action Plan, the Lancashire Structure Plan, UK (Regional Planning)
  - Lyon 2010: Strategic Planning in Action, France (Regional Planning Award)
  - Bedre By – Towards the Sustainable City, Aalborg, Denmark (Best Planning Document)
- 1998 3rd Planning Awards
  - Historic Santiago de Compostela Cherishes its Past, Spain (Local Planning)
  - Popular support for Po Delta Plan, Italy (Regional Planning)
  - Keeping old Toledo Alive, Spain, in association with USA (Planning between EU and other countries)

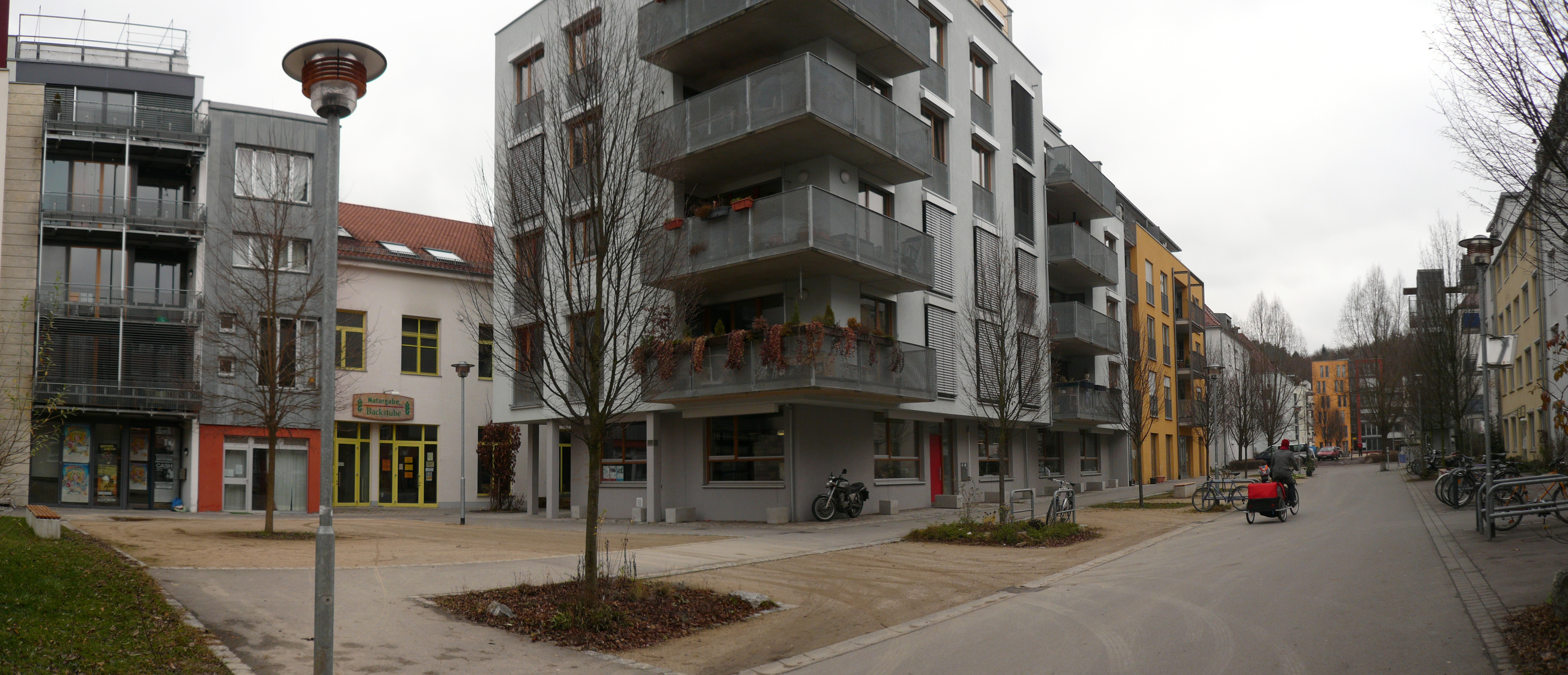
Südstadt Tübingen (2002)

- 2002 4th Planning Awards
  - Land Planning Guidelines for Valladolid, Spain (Category: Planning)
  - The ROM-Project for the Gent canal Zone, Belgium (Category: Regional Planning)
  - Special Plan for the Old City of León, Spain (Category: Urban Design)
  - Südstadt, Tübingen, Germany (Category: Conversion and Renewal)
  - The Village, Caterham-on-the-Hill, England (Category: Conversion and Renewal)
  - Kanaalzone Plan at Apeldoorn, The Netherlands (Category: Water and City)
- 2004 5th Planning Awards
  - Abandoibara regeneration project and new southern railway line (OAVS), Bilbao, Spain (Category: Local Plans: Re-development)
  - Urban Restructuring: Workshop for the City's Future, Leinefelde, Germany (Category: Local Plans: Re-development)
  - Master Plan Steigereiland, Amsterdam, Netherlands (Category: Local Plans: New Development )
  - Child-Friendly Urban Renewal in Prenzlauer Berg, Berlin, Germany (Category: Urban & Neighbourhood Management)
- 2006 6th Planning Awards

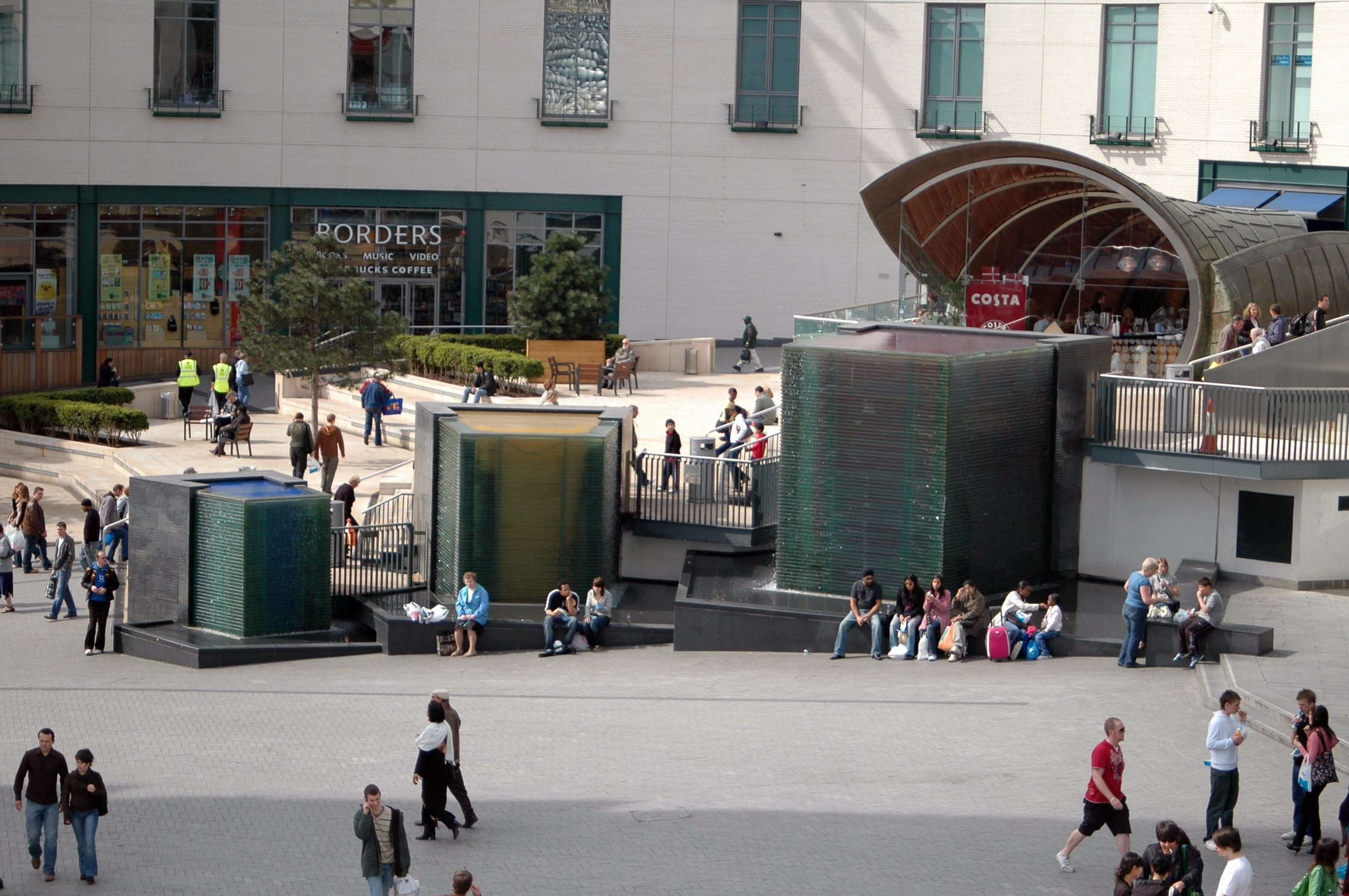
Bullring, Birmingham (2006)

  - Asturias Coastal Zone Protection Plan (POLA), Spain (Category: Regional Planning )
  - The Basque Regional Strategy, Spain (Category: Regional Planning )
  - Local Spatial Plan for Wzgórze Św. Bronisławy (St. Bronisława Hill), Poland (Category: Local Planning)
  - Parc Saint-Léonard, Liège, Belgium (Category: Urban Design)
  - The Bullring, Birmingham (Category: Urban Design)
- 2008 7th Planning Awards
  - The Green Metropolis – tri-national regional development project, Germany-Netherlands-Belgium (Category: Cross-Border Planning / Regional Planning / Territorial Cohesion)
  - Drammen, Norway (Category: Urban Region)
  - Rombeek-Enschede, Netherlands (Category: Public Participation in Planning)
  - Stonebridge, London, UK (Category: Public Participation in Planning)
  - Ecocity of Sarriguren, Spain (Category: Environmental / Sustainability)
- 2010 8th Planning Awards, presented in Brussels

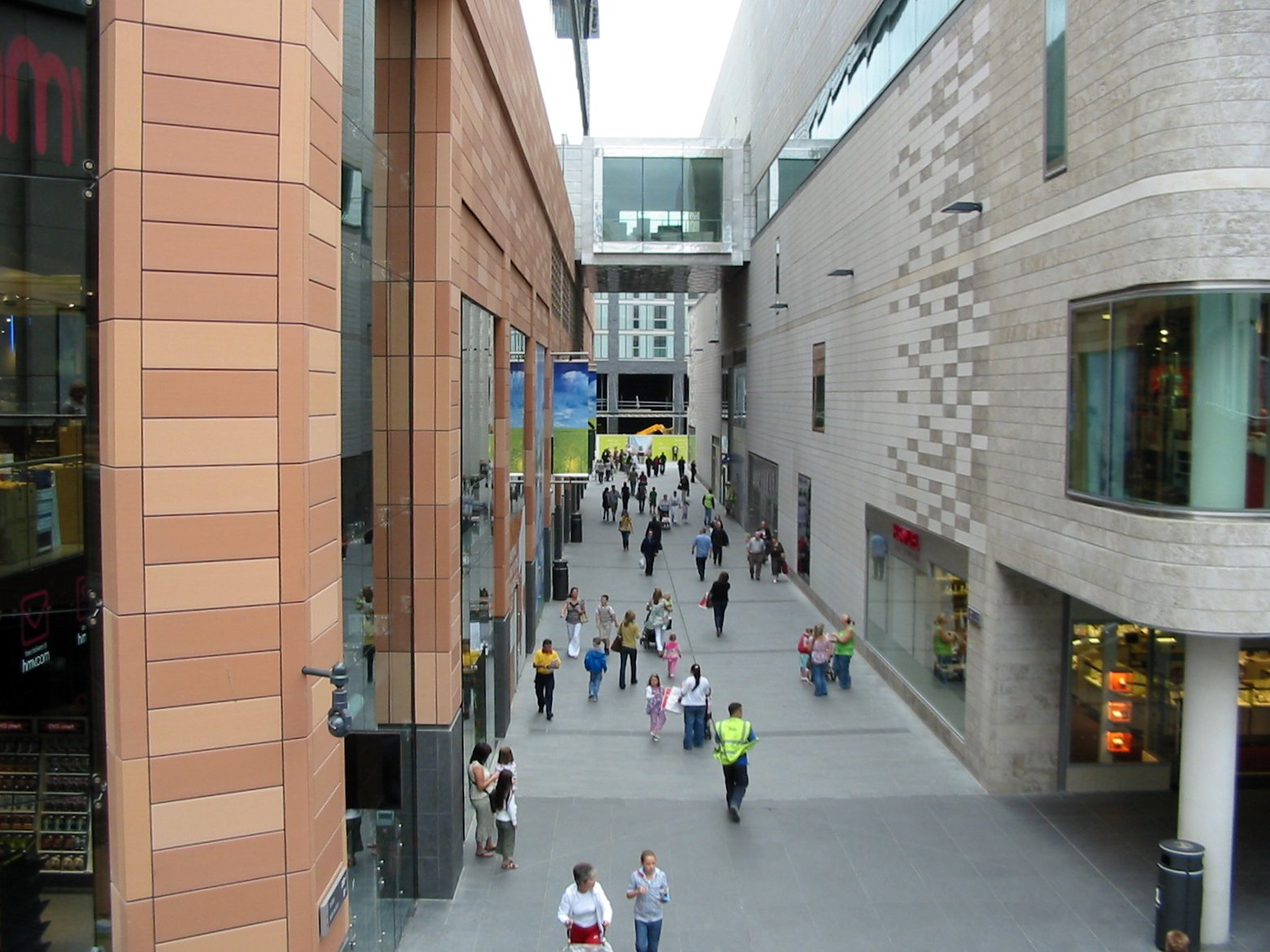
Liverpool One (2010)

  - Cross-border Geneva: an urban project as the cornerstone for a united conurbation, Geneva
  - Progetto Po – Plans, programmes and projects for the protection and enhancement of the Po River in Piedmont, Italy
  - Liverpool One – Regeneration, Renewal, Reinvention, UK
  - Turin Town Plan, Italy
  - Transformation plan of La Mina neighbourhood in the Barcelona conurbation, Spain
- 2012 9th Planning Awards
  - Central Madrid Project, Spain
  - The Garden City – Jardin Plessis Robinson, France
- 2014 10th Planning Awards
  - Embarking the Whole Territory on the Path of Sustainability – Department of Town and Country Planning, Housing and Energy, Republic and State of Geneva, Switzerland
  - Montmélian and its future Triangle Sud solar area, France
  - Fornebu green town built on outstanding national and international expertise, Norway
  - Limburg Territorial Development Programme, Belgium
