= Alberto Calza Bini =

Italian architect, painter and politician (1881–1957)

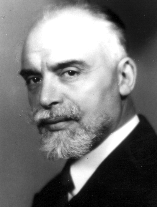

Senator of the Kingdom of Italy
- In office 6 February 1943 – 2 August 1943

Member of the Chamber of Fasces and Corporations
- In office 1939–1943

Member of the Chamber of Deputies
- In office 1929–1939

Personal details
- Born: 7 December 1881 Rome, Kingdom of Italy
- Died: 25 December 1957 (aged 76) Rome, Italy
- Party: National Fascist Party
- Children: Giorgio Calza Bini
- Occupation: Architect, painter, academic

Alberto Calza Bini (7 December 1881 – 25 December 1957) was an Italian architect, painter, academic and politician. He taught architecture in Rome and Naples, served as president of the Accademia di San Luca, and founded the Istituto Nazionale di Urbanistica in 1930.

Calza Bini was elected to the Chamber of Deputies, later served in the Chamber of Fasces and Corporations, and was appointed a Senator of the Kingdom of Italy in 1943. He is noted for his contribution to Italian urban planning and public housing.
