= Giorgio Calza Bini =

- Born: 4 November 1908; Livorno, Kingdom of Italy
- Died: 26 September 1999 (aged 90); Rome, Italy
- Education: Sapienza University of Rome
- Occupations: Architect, urban planner
- Father: Alberto Calza Bini

Giorgio Calza Bini (4 November 1908 – 26 September 1999) was an Italian architect and urban planner.

== Life and career ==
Born in Livorno, he was the son of architect and politician Alberto Calza Bini. He graduated in architecture from the Sapienza University of Rome in 1933, receiving the Valadier Prize for the highest academic result of the year. He obtained his professional qualification at the Polytechnic University of Milan in the same year. From 1934 he worked as an assistant at the Faculty of Architecture in Rome, obtained a teaching qualification in urban planning in 1941.

He designed service stations along the Genoa–Serravalle motorway (1934–1936) and drafted the master plan for Guidonia Montecelio (1935), where he designed the central square and the town hall.

Between 1947 and 1952 he collaborated with the studio of Marcello Piacentini, and from 1951 to 1955 he was director of the architecture and urban planning services for the development of the EUR district. In 1952, he became lecturer in urban planning techniques at Rome University.

Throughout his career Calza Bini participated in numerous urban planning competitions and prepared plans for cities including Salerno, Taranto, Anzio, Lecce, Bari and Bologna. He was also involved in professional institutions, including the National Institute of Urban Planning (INU), the Pontifical Commission for Sacred Art and the Order of Architects of Rome, of which he became dean in 1992.

Calza Bini died in Rome on 26 September 1999.

== Archives ==
His professional archive, covering the period 1930–1980, was donated by his heirs to the Central Archives of the State in 2016. It contains drawings, project documents, photographs and personal papers relating to his architectural and urban planning activity.

== Sources ==
- Giorgio Calza Bini: Decano 1992 (in Italian). Rome: Kappa. 1992.
- Bizzotto, R.; Chiumenti, L.; Muntoni, A. (1983). 50 anni di professione (in Italian). Rome: Ordine degli architetti di Roma. pp. 65–68, 158.
- Currà, E.; Paolini, C., eds. (2005). Ingegnerie a Guidonia: dal centro studi ed esperienze al polo aerospaziale (in Italian). Rome: Gangemi.
- Guccione, M.; Pesce, D.; Reale, E., eds. (2007). Guida agli archivi di architettura a Roma e nel Lazio (in Italian). Rome: Gangemi. p. 85.
- Currà, E. (2012). "Alcune opere di Giorgio Calza Bini all'EUR: la ricerca di una nuova identità per l'E42". Rassegna di architettura e urbanistica (in Italian). XLV (134/135): 45–54.
- Currà, E. (2017). "Le sale per lo spettacolo di Giorgio Calza Bini. Realizzazione e progetto di architetture polifunzionali". In Turco, M.G. (ed.). Dal teatro all'italiana alle sale cinematografiche: questioni di storia e prospettive di valorizzazione (in Italian). Rome: Quasar. pp. 147–154.
