= Edoardo Salzano =

Italian engineer and urban planner (1930–2019)

- Born: 5 February 1930; Naples, Kingdom of Italy
- Died: 23 September 2019 (aged 89); Venice, Italy
- Education: Sapienza University of Rome
- Occupations: Engineer, urban planner, academic

Edoardo Salzano (5 February 1930 – 23 September 2019) was an Italian engineer, urban planner and academic. One of the leading figures in post-war Italian urban planning, he was professor at the IUAV University of Venice, president of the Italian National Institute of Urban Planning (INU) from 1983 to 1991, and founder of the journal Urbanistica Informazioni. He was noted for his advocacy of public-interest planning and the protection of historic cities and landscapes.

Salzano contributed to the preparation of numerous planning instruments across Italy, including master plans for cities such as Grosseto, Giulianova, Venice, Carpi, Imola, Sesto Fiorentino and Duino-Aurisina. He also worked on territorial planning for the provinces of Teramo, La Spezia, Salerno, Foggia and Latina, and contributed to the Regional Landscape Plan of Sardinia (2006).

== Selected works ==
- Urbanistica e società opulenta (1969)
- Fondamenti di urbanistica (2004)
- Memorie di un urbanista. L'Italia che ho vissuto (2010)
