= Ivanka Popović =

Serbian academic

PhD Ivanka Popović
- Иванка Поповић
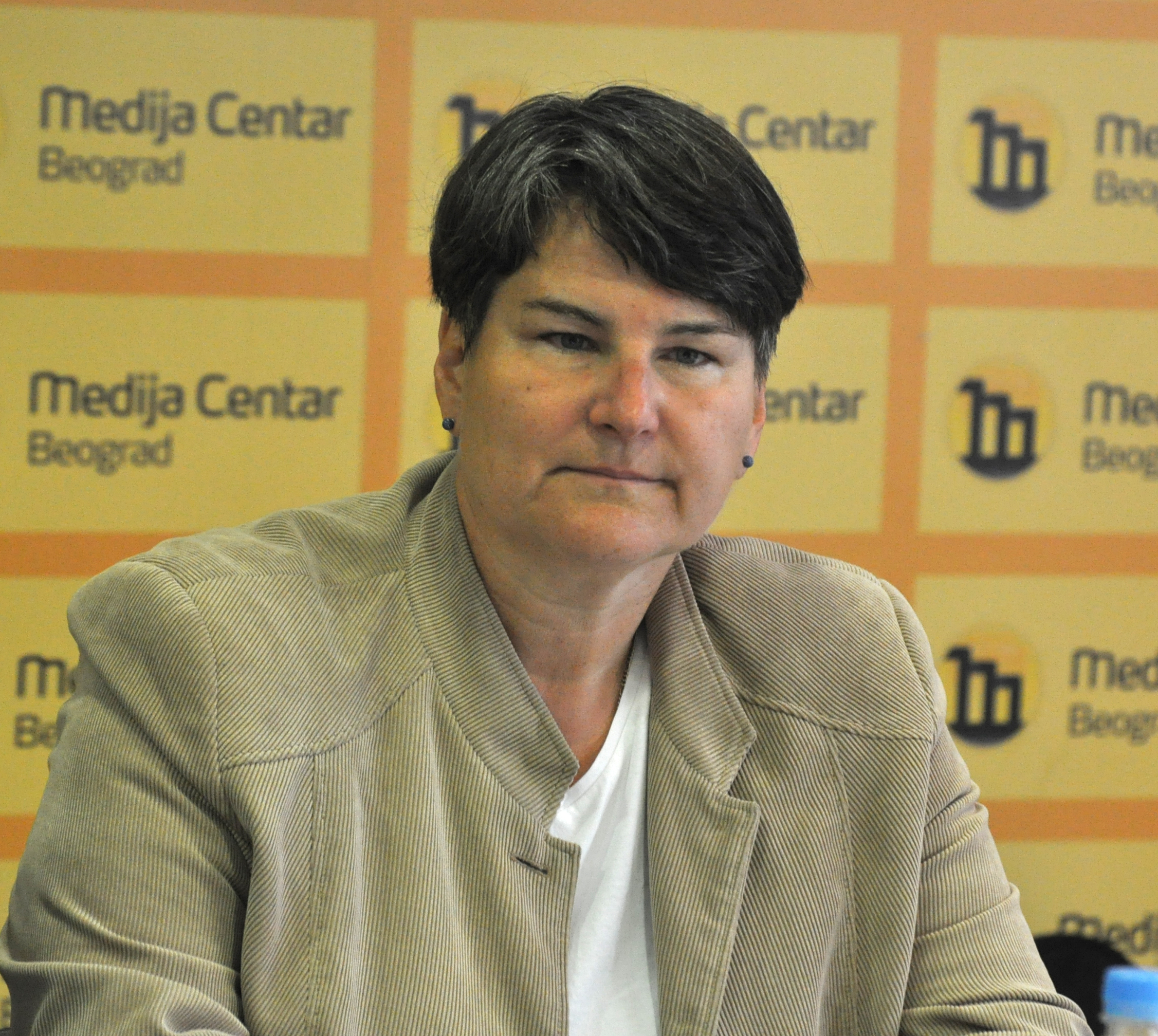
- Ivanka Popović in 2015

Rector of the University of Belgrade
- In office 1 October 2018 – 1 October 2021
- Preceded by: Vladimir Bumbaširević
- Succeeded by: Vladan Đokić

Personal details
- Born: 1959 (age 66–67) Rio de Janeiro, Brazil
- Education: University of Belgrade (MD, PhD); University of Maryland (BD)
- Alma mater: University of Belgrade

Ivanka Popović (Serbian Cyrillic: Иванка Поповић; born 1959) is a Serbian professor and former rector of the University of Belgrade. She has authored and co-authored more than 85 scientific papers.

== Biography ==
She was born in Rio de Janeiro to a prominent family. Her father was Yugoslav ambassador and diplomat, while her grandfather was Daka Popović, a member of the Senate of the Kingdom of Yugoslavia. She studied chemical engineering at the University of Maryland and completed her studies at the Faculty of Technology and Metallurgy of the University of Belgrade, where she earned her doctorate. She became a professor at the University of Belgrade in 2001. In May 2018, she was elected rector of the University of Belgrade and was sworn on 1 October 2018. On 1 October 2021, she was succeeded by Vladan Đokić.
