= Gianluigi Nigro =

Italian architect and urban planner (1936–2012)

- Born: 22 August 1936; Ortona, Italy
- Died: 14 February 2012 (aged 75); Rome, Italy
- Education: Sapienza University of Rome
- Occupations: Architect, urban planner, academic

Gianluigi Nigro (22 August 1936 – 14 February 2012) was an Italian architect, urban planner, academic, and president of the National Institute of Urban Planning (INU) from 1990 to 1992.

== Life and career ==
Born in Ortona, Nigro graduated in architecture from Sapienza University of Rome in 1963 and joined the Order of Architects of the Province of Rome the following year. From 1963 to 1979 he served as a consultant to the Directorate-General for Urban Planning of the Ministry of Public Works and, from 1968, was listed in the ministry's register of territorial planning experts.

Nigro began teaching at the Faculty of Architecture of Sapienza University in 1964. He became an associate professor of urban planning in 1983 and was promoted to full professor in 2000, serving until his retirement in 2007. He also coordinated the university's doctoral programme in territorial and urban planning and chaired the master's degree programme in territorial and environmental planning.

A member of the National Institute of Urban Planning (INU) from 1973, Nigro served on its National Executive Council from 1980. He was the institute's secretary general from 1981 to 1990 and its president from 1990 to 1992.

Throughout his career Nigro was involved in the preparation of numerous urban and regional planning projects across Italy. He served as consultant and coordinator for the landscape plans of the regions of Basilicata, Abruzzo, and Molise between 1985 and 1991, and later for the Territorial Strategic Plan and the Regional Landscape Plan of Umbria (2007–2012). He also contributed to the reconstruction planning in Umbria following the 1997 earthquake. As an urban planning consultant, he worked on master plans for several Italian municipalities, including Rome, Bari, Ravenna, Cosenza, Roseto degli Abruzzi, Foligno, Todi, Città di Castello, and Matera, where he also designed the Agna Le Piane district.

Nigro died in Rome on 14 February 2012.

== Selected publications ==
- I padroni della casa. Coines, Rome, 1972.
- Territorio e pianificazione. Esperienze di ricerca e formazione. Officina, Rome, 1972.
- Regioni, programmazione, pianificazione territoriale. Edizioni delle Autonomie, Rome, 1981.
- Recupero e pianificazione urbana. Nuova Italia Scientifica, Rome, 1981.
- Innovazione in urbanistica: Abruzzo, Emilia Romagna, Lazio. Gangemi, Rome, 1996.
- Urbanistica: innovazione possibile. Gangemi, Rome, 1997.
- PRG di ultima generazione. Argomenti di riflessione e letture di piani locali. Gangemi, Rome, 1999.
- Ricostruire la complessità. I PIR e la ricostruzione in Umbria. Alinea, Florence, 2002.
- Politiche, programmi e piani nel governo della città. Integrazione e percorsi strategici alla ricerca dell'efficacia. Gangemi, Rome, 2003.
- Il territorio rinnovato. Uno sguardo urbanistico sulla ricostruzione post-sismica in Umbria 1997–2007. Quattroemme, Perugia, 2007.

== Sources ==
- Bruni, Alessandro; Marini, Franco; Nigro, Francesco, eds. (2015). Gianluigi Nigro e venti anni di urbanistica in Umbria. Bilanci e prospettive. Rome: INU Edizioni.
- Fazzio, Francesco; Bondesan, Benedetta, eds. (2007). I paesaggi nell'Umbria del terremoto 1997–2007. Un atlante. Perugia: Quattroemme.
