= Venuta =

Venuta is a surname. Notable people with the surname include:

- Benay Venuta (1910–1995), American actress, singer and dancer
- Gianpaolo Venuta (born 1978), Canadian actor

== See also ==
- Venuti, another surname
- Venuto, another surname
