= Vladan Đokić =

Serbian architect (born 1963)

- Владан Ђокић
- Vladan Đokić in 2026

Rector of the University of Belgrade
- Incumbent
- Assumed office 1 October 2021
- Preceded by: Ivanka Popović

Dean of the Faculty of Architecture
- In office 1 October 2012 – 1 October 2021
- Preceded by: Vladimir Mako
- Succeeded by: Vladimir Lojanica

Personal details
- Born: 20 September 1963 (age 62) Belgrade, SR Serbia, SFR Yugoslavia
- Education: University of Belgrade (BD, PhD); University of Southern California (MD)
- Alma mater: University of Belgrade

Vladan Đokić (Serbian Cyrillic: Владан Ђокић; born 20 September 1963) is a Serbian university professor and architect, who has served as rector of the University of Belgrade since 2021.

== Early life and education ==
Đokić was born on 20 September 1963 in Belgrade, SR Serbia, SFR Yugoslavia. He graduated from the Faculty of Architecture of the University of Belgrade in 1988. As a student, he completed an internship at the architectural firm MM Architectes in Montreal. He obtained a master's degree in 1991 from the USC School of Architecture and a PhD in 1998 from his alma mater, the University of Belgrade.

== Career ==
In April 1992, he has been employed as a teaching assistant, and in 1994, he was appointed as an assistant professor in the field of Urban Environment and Urbanization at the Department of Urbanism and Spatial Planning, Faculty of Architecture, University of Belgrade. Between 1992 and 1999, as a junior lecturer, he was involved in teaching courses at the Department of Urbanism and Spatial Planning, including "Urban Environment and Urbanization," "Urban Structure and Zoning," "Urban Functions," and "Urban and Spatial Planning." In addition to his work in these courses, he participated for six years in the implementation of integrated teaching for courses such as "Integrated Project 1," "Integrated Project 2," and "Integrated Project 3," at the Department of Architectural and Urban Planning Design.

He was appointed associate professor in the field of Urbanism and Spatial Planning in 2004, and in 2010, he became a full professor at the Department of Urbanism at the Faculty of Architecture. From 2006 to 2012, he served as the Vice Dean for Research at the Faculty of Architecture. In 2012 Đokić was elected Dean of the Faculty of Architecture. He was re-elected twice, in 2015 and 2018, and served all three terms in full, until 2021.

In 2014, he was appointed to the working group for the expert review of the Draft Spatial Plan for the Special Purpose Area for the Development of the Belgrade Riverfront, as part of the Belgrade Waterfront project. However, due to being unavailable, he did not attend the session at which it was decided that the plan could proceed to the next stage of adoption, thereby enabling the commencement of construction of the controversial development along the Sava Riverbank.

He was a member of the Assembly of Red Star Football Club during the 2017–2021 term. From 2017 to 2021 he was a member of the executive committee of the European Council of Spatial Planners. Since 2017 Đokić has been the president of the Serbian Network of Urban Morphology.

In 2020, Professor Dragana Vasiljević Tomić from the Faculty of Architecture filed a complaint against Dean Đokić with the Ethics Committee of the University of Belgrade, accusing him of unethical conduct. She also appealed to the university's highest authority on matters of ethical violations, claiming that Đokić, with the help of his associates, had obstructed her promotion to full professor by favouring another candidate. The complaint was dismissed in April 2021.

On 25 May 2021 at the session of the University of Belgrade Council, Vladan Đokić, was elected as rector with 23 votes, while the incumbent, Ivanka Popović, received 17 votes. BIRN reported that, since the process to elect a new rector began in January, the election had been marred by procedural irregularities and pressure.

== Serbian anti-corruption protests ==
During 2024–2026 Serbian anti-corruption protests Đokić stated that students have the absolute support of the university and the entire academic community. Due to his support for the student-led protests and his refusal to suppress them, government officials and pro-government tabloid tried to portray Đokić as the mastermind behind the protests, alleging he was using them to build his political career from protest. After minister Darko Glišić stated that Đokić "must be arrested," the next threat came from the President of the National Assembly, Ana Brnabić, who declared that the rector would have to be held accountable. She accused him of violating the Constitution and laws for four months, insisting that such actions cannot go unpunished.

On 17 April 2025 Đokić was called for an informational interview by the police as part of a preliminary investigation concerning alleged abuse of office. The Network for Academic Solidarity and Engagement called on members of the academic community to show their support for Đokić by gathering in front of the Directorate of Criminal Police. On 18 April 2025, Marta Kos, the European Commissioner for Enlargement, expressed concern over the charges being sought against Đokić, stating: "I am concerned that criminal charges are being sought against the Rector of Belgrade University".

On 20 April 2026 Đokić met with Marta Kos in order to discuss ongoing autonomy of the University of Belgrade, election process in Serbia and Serbia's accession to EU.
