= Palazzo della Ragione (Ferrara) =

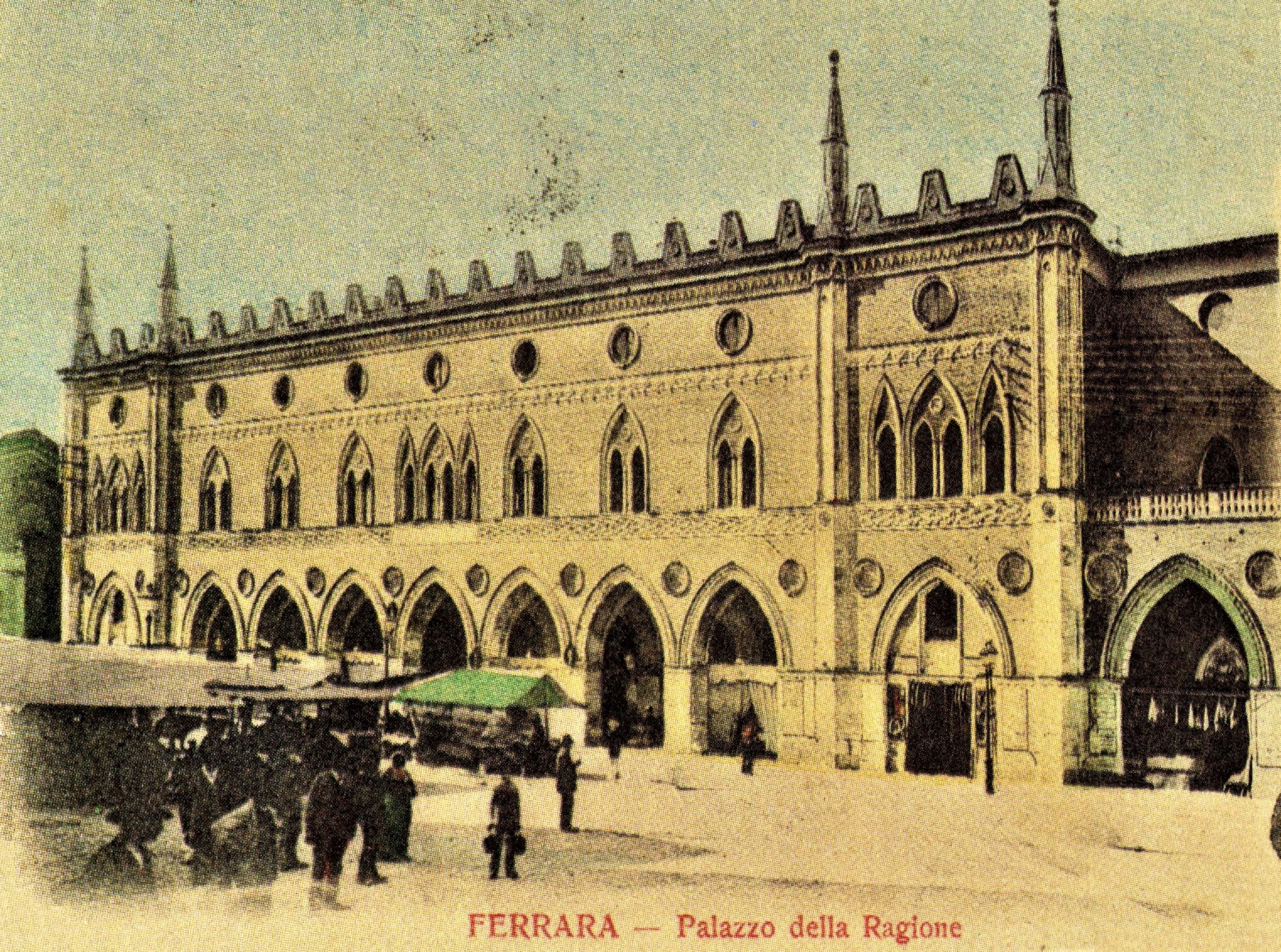
- Palazzo della Ragione in Ferrara as it appeared at the beginning of the 20th century
- Interactive map of the Palazzo della Ragione area

General information
- Status: In use
- Type: Palace
- Architectural style: Gothic architecture
- Location: Ferrara, Italy, Piazza Trento e Trieste
- Coordinates: 44.835237°N 11.61946°E
- Construction started: 14th century
- Renovated: Rebuilt in different forms and with different functions in the second half of the 20th century

The Palazzo della Ragione of Ferrara was located in Piazza Trento e Trieste on the corner of Corso Porta Reno. It was built between 1315 and 1325, modified several times and finally demolished after the fire that destroyed it in 1945. A new palace was built in its place, designed by Marcello Piacentini.

== History ==
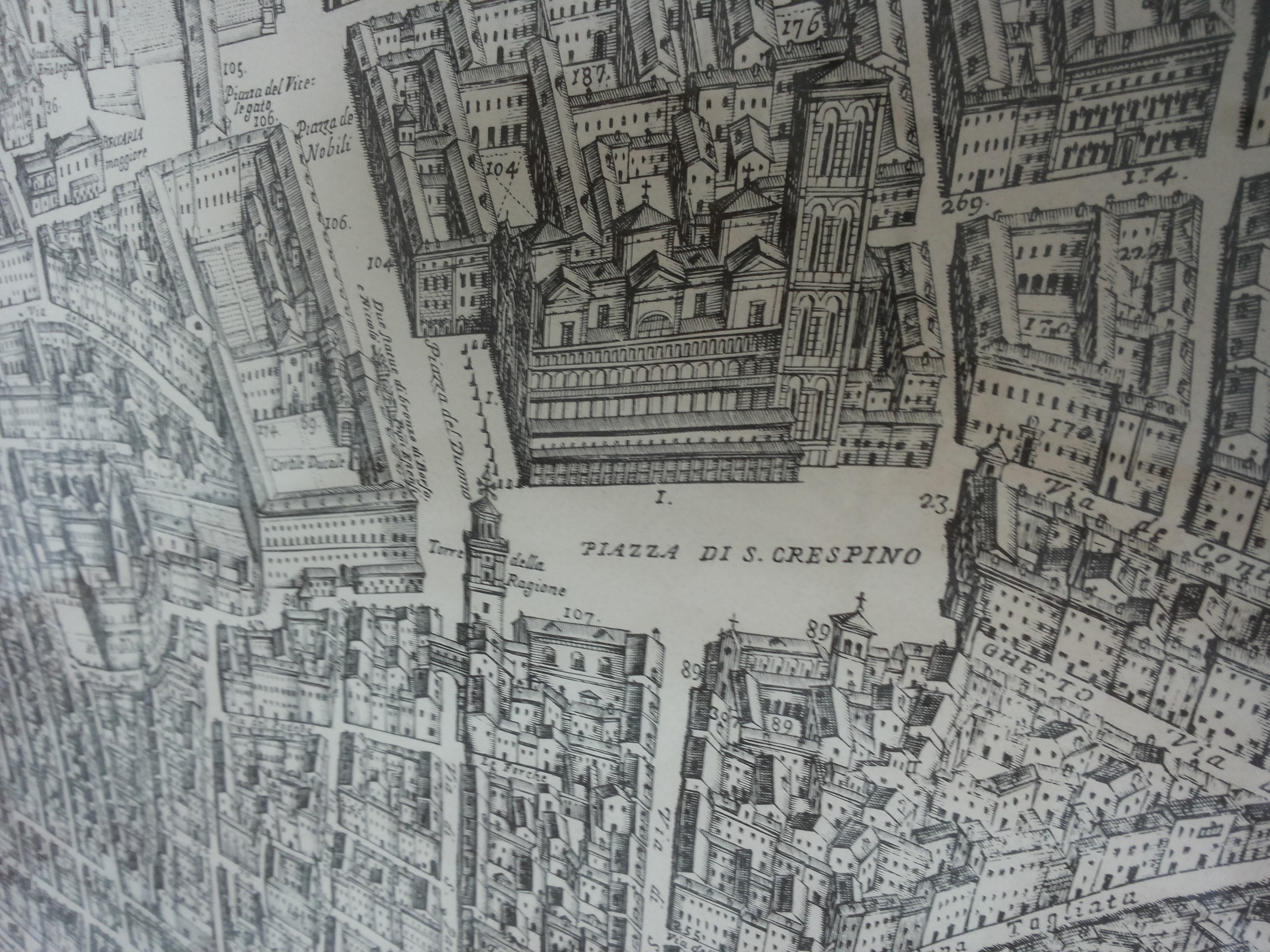
The then Piazza di San Crispino with the Palazzo della Ragione in the Pianta ed alzato della città di Ferrara by Andrea Bolzoni of 1747

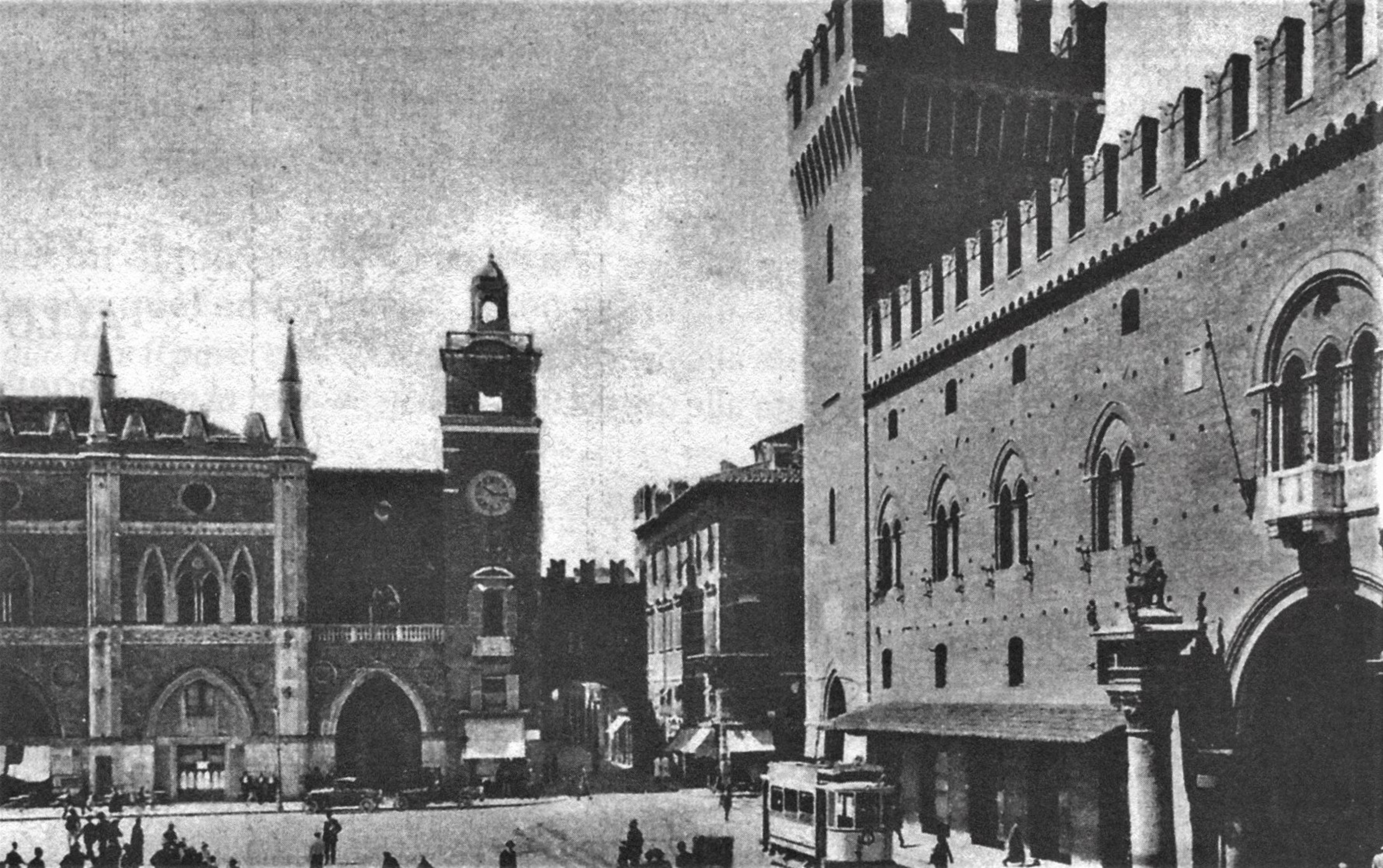
Palazzo della Ragione in Ferrara in the brief interval between the building of the Torre della Vittoria, completed in 1928, and the fire that destroyed it, shortly after the city was liberated by British troops in 1945

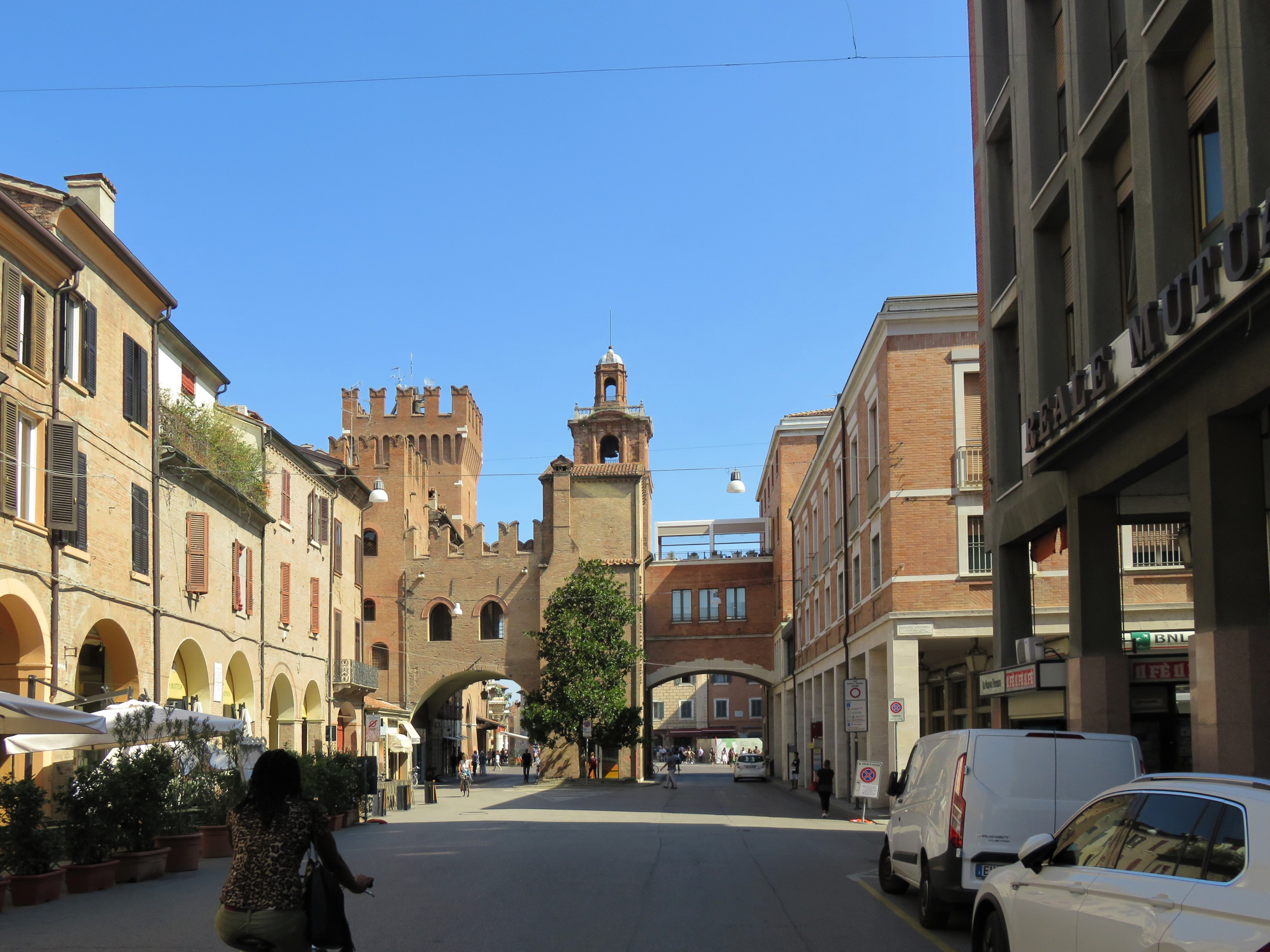
Northern part of Corso Porta Reno. In the centre the Clock Tower between the two faces of access to the square. On the right the part built in the 1950s, with the Palazzo della Ragione and other buildings

It was the seat of the court of Ferrara and also of execution of death sentences. The palace was actually a set of buildings that included the tower of the Rebels and the palace of the Notaries. It was built from 1315 onwards, located next to the Cathedral of San Giorgio (Ferrara), on the other side of the then Piazza delle Erbe.

The bodies of the executed were hung from its windows for a long time and during the rule of the Este all those involved in conspiracies and plots were judged and executed there. In the aftermath of the conspiracy organised by Giulio and Ferrante d'Este against duke Alfonso I all the rebels were executed and their heads impaled on spears placed on top of the palace. This episode was later also cited by Ludovico Ariosto.

It had a Gothic structure and the original palace was probably similar to the palazzo della Ragione di Mantova, which is still intact. It was damaged by a fire in 1472 and by the earthquake that struck the city in 1570.

=== 19th-century reconstruction ===
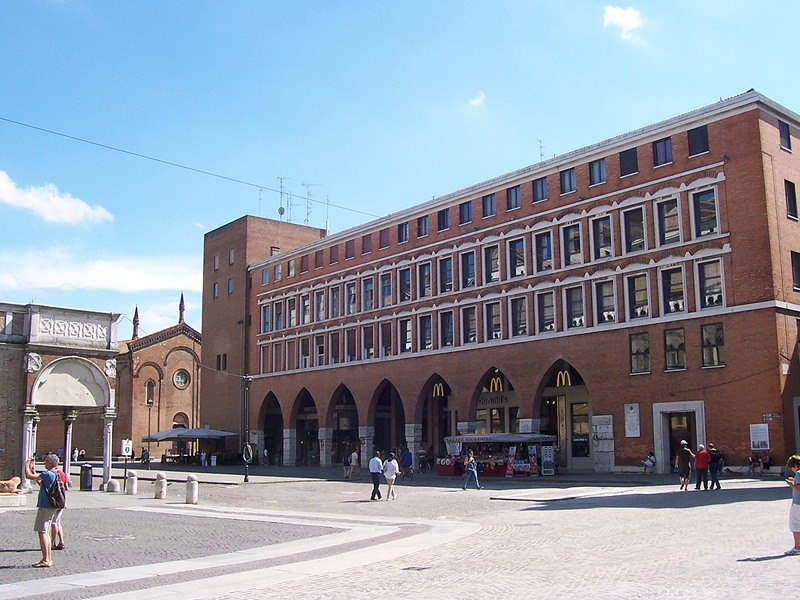
Recent forms of the palazzo after 20th-century reconstruction

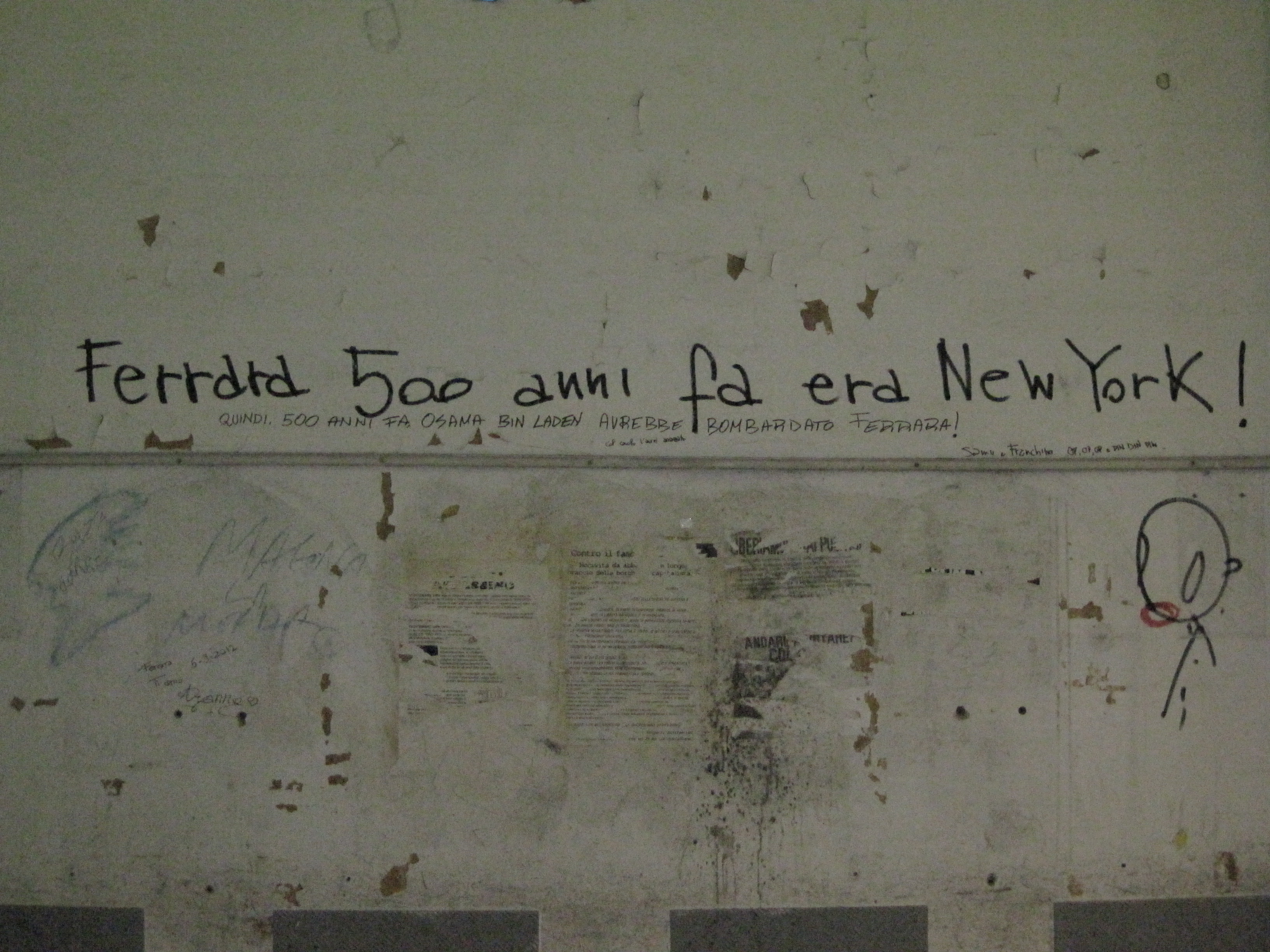
Graffito present for a brief period in 2012 on an internal wall of the portico of the Palazzo della Ragione in Ferrara at the corner with Corso Porta Reno with the inscription Ferrara 500 years ago was New York' cited by Giovanni De Mauro in the magazine International.

Its reconstruction in the 19th century was entrusted to the town's architect and chief engineer Giovanni Tosi who respected the original architectural form in his design. The old structure, after the abandonment of the Este family with the devolution of Ferrara, had slowly fallen into a state of decay and its reconstruction in neo-Gothic forms, which brought back the pointed arches of the 14th-century building, gave Ferrara back an important architectural monument, enriched with a grand entrance staircase.

=== 20th century reconstruction ===
In 1921, the archives of the courthouse were partially destroyed by fire and the structure was also partly damaged by interventions to contain the flames. On 22 April 1945, two days before the arrival of the allied troops and thus the liberation of Ferrara, the structure was seriously damaged by another fire which reduced the building to just the external walls, causing the floors and roof coverings to collapse. On this occasion much of the documentation relating to the previous decades of the fascist period was lost.

In a photographic image from the Archive of the Ferrara Ethnographic Centre, a section of Scottish troops can be seen parading in Piazza Duomo, with the still apparently intact palace in the background.

The building was rebuilt almost ten years later, between 1954 and 1956, while the entire district was heavily modified with the widening of Corso Porta Reno and the demolition of most of the buildings on its eastern side.

Reconstruction combined with urban planning changes led to the opening of a second large access face to Piazza Trento e Trieste, thus isolating the Clock Tower, located in the centre of the double passage. The project for the new palace was entrusted to Marcello Piacentini che a Ferrara eseguì uno dei suoi ultimi lavori, poiché morì solo quattro anni più tardi.

== Use of the palace ==
In early times, the building served as a court and as a place for the execution of sentences. Both its premises and its façade in the central square of Ferrara were used as a 'theatre stage' at the time of the Este, and also to hold important public ceremonies, such as the celebrations in 1502 for the marriage of Alfonso I and Lucrezia Borgia. After the fire of 1512, it was rebuilt and from then on also became a part of the city prison, while the first commercial shops were opened on the ground floor. It slowly lost importance until its reconstruction in the 19th century. The lower part of the structure continued to be used for commerce, while the upper part retained its function related to justice, with the seat of the court, magistrates' courts and other judicial offices and archives. From the second half of the 20th century, with the last reconstruction entrusted to Marcello Piacentini, its use was changed. The lower part was still used for commercial activities while the upper part became a hotel. The entire structure was since then private property.

== Bibliography ==
=== Italian sources ===
- Gerolamo Melchiorri (2009). Carlo Bassi (ed.). Nomenclatura ed etimologia delle piazze e strade di Ferrara e Ampliamenti. Ferrara: 2G Editrice.
- Francesca Bocchi, ed. (1989). Storia illustrata di Ferrara. 3. Diego Cavallina (coordinamento), Angela Ghinato (ricerca iconografica e redazione). Milano: Nuova Editoriale AIEP. OCLC 963856385.
- Dino Tebaldi, Francesco Pozzati, Roberta Falchieri (2007). Il Palazzo della Ragione di Ferrara. Ferrara: 2G Editrice. OCLC 955974914.
