= Benvenuta =

Benvenuta may refer to:

- Benvenuta (film), a 1983 Belgian-French-Italian romantic drama film.
- Benvenuta Bojani, an Italian Roman Catholic of the Third Order of Saint Dominic.
- Medley Hall, a residential college of the University of Melbourne in Australia. Originally called Benvenuta.
