= Istituto Nazionale di Urbanistica =

Italian urban planning association

- Abbreviation: INU
- Formation: 1930
- Type: Public law association
- Headquarters: Rome, Italy
- Members: European Council of Spatial Planners
- President: Michele Talia
- Website: www.inu.it

The Istituto Nazionale di Urbanistica (INU, National Institute of Urban Planning) is an Italian public law association founded in 1930 to promote research, education and professional development in the fields of urban and regional planning. Its headquarters are on Via Castro dei Volsci in Rome.

The institute is organised as a non-profit association of public bodies and individual members. Its legal status as a public law institution was established by Presidential Decree No. 1114 of 21 November 1949. In 1997 it was officially recognised by the Italian Ministry of the Environment as an environmental protection association.

The INU is a member of the European Council of Spatial Planners (ECTP-CEU).

The institute publishes several scholarly and professional journals, including Urbanistica, its official journal since its early years, Urbanistica Informazioni, Urbanistica Dossier, and Urbanistica Quaderni. In 2001 it also promoted the launch of Planum, one of Europe's first online journals dedicated to urban and regional planning.

== Presidents ==
President	Term of office	
President	Start	End
Alberto Calza Bini	1930	1944
Domenico Delli Santi (Note: Special Commissioner)	1944	1948
Leone Cattani	1948	1950
Adriano Olivetti	1950	1960
Camillo Ripamonti	1960	May 1969
Paolo Barile	May 1969	February 1970
Edoardo Detti	February 1970	1977
Alessandro Tutino	1977	1983
Edoardo Salzano	1983	1990
Gianluigi Nigro	1990	1992
Giuseppe Campos Venuti	1992	1993
Stefano Stanghellini	1993	2001
Paolo Avarello	2001	2005
Federico Oliva	2005	2013
Silvia Viviani	December 2013	July 2019
Michele Talia	July 2019	Incumbent
