= Pietro Benvenuto degli Ordini =

Pietro Benvenuto degli Ordini of Ferrara (working second half of the 15th century) was the court architect of Borso d'Este, Duke of Ferrara. In the Castello Estense, Ferrara, he was responsible for the courtyard and the splendid external staircase of honour erected in 1481; it dominates the piazza.

He was also responsible for the Palazzo Schifanoia, where he was called upon in 1465 to remodel and extend the structure and to develop a ducal apartment on an upper level. At Schifanoia he was succeeded by his assistant Biagio Rossetti.
