= Augusto Benvenuti =

Italian sculptor

Augusto Benvenuti (January 8, 1839 – February 7, 1899) was an Italian sculptor, born and active in Venice and the Veneto.

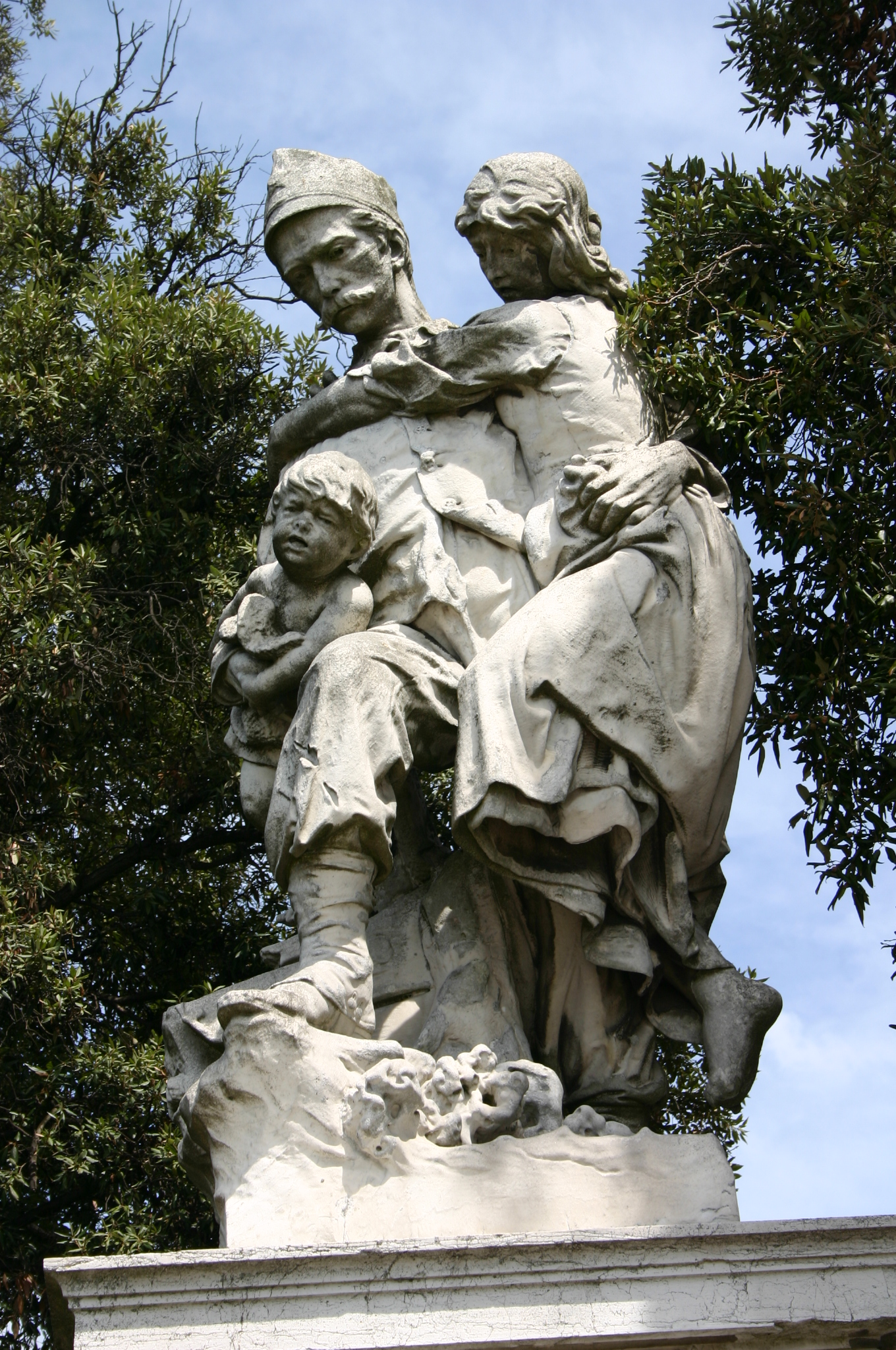
Monument to the Army, Venice

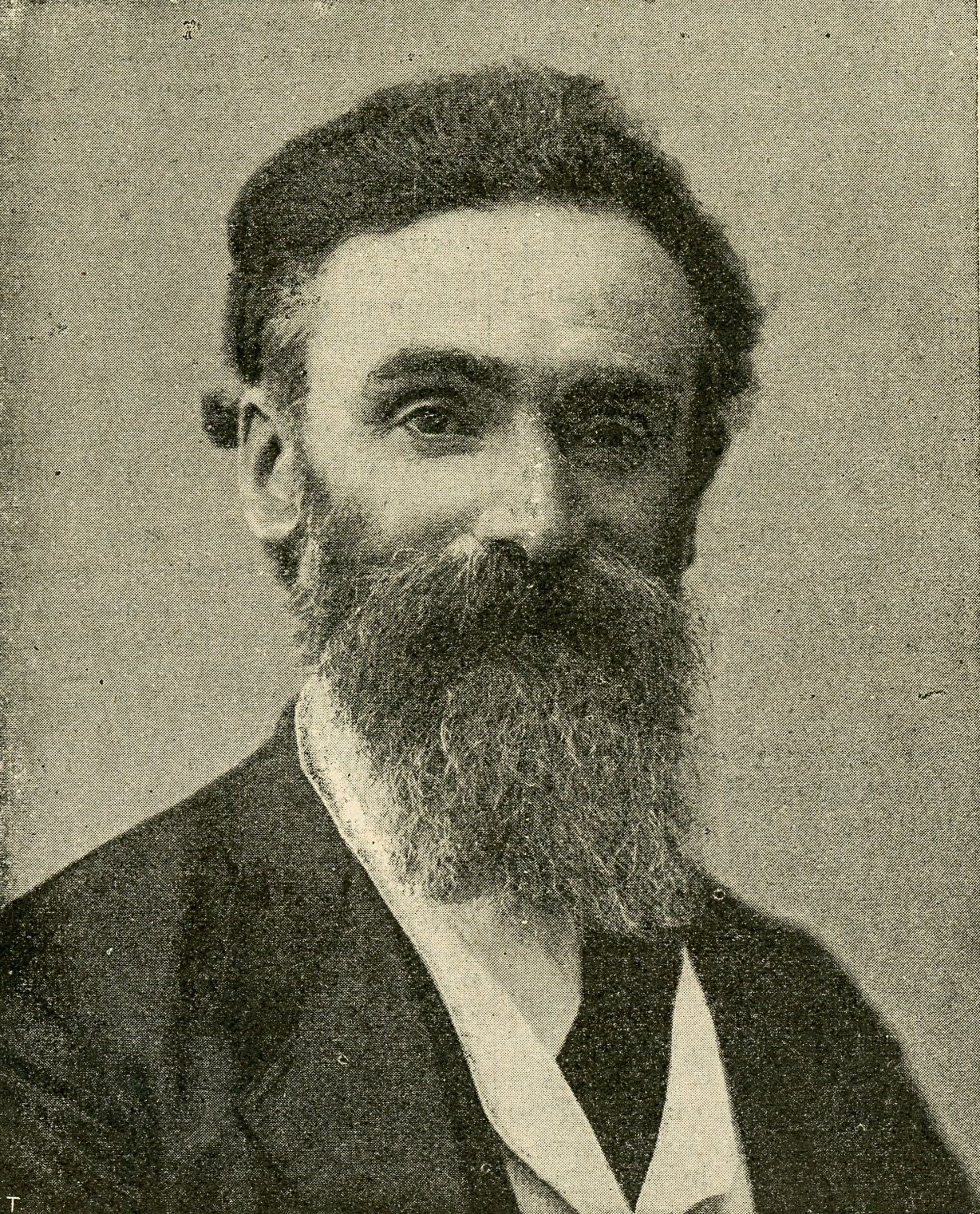
Augusto Benvenuti

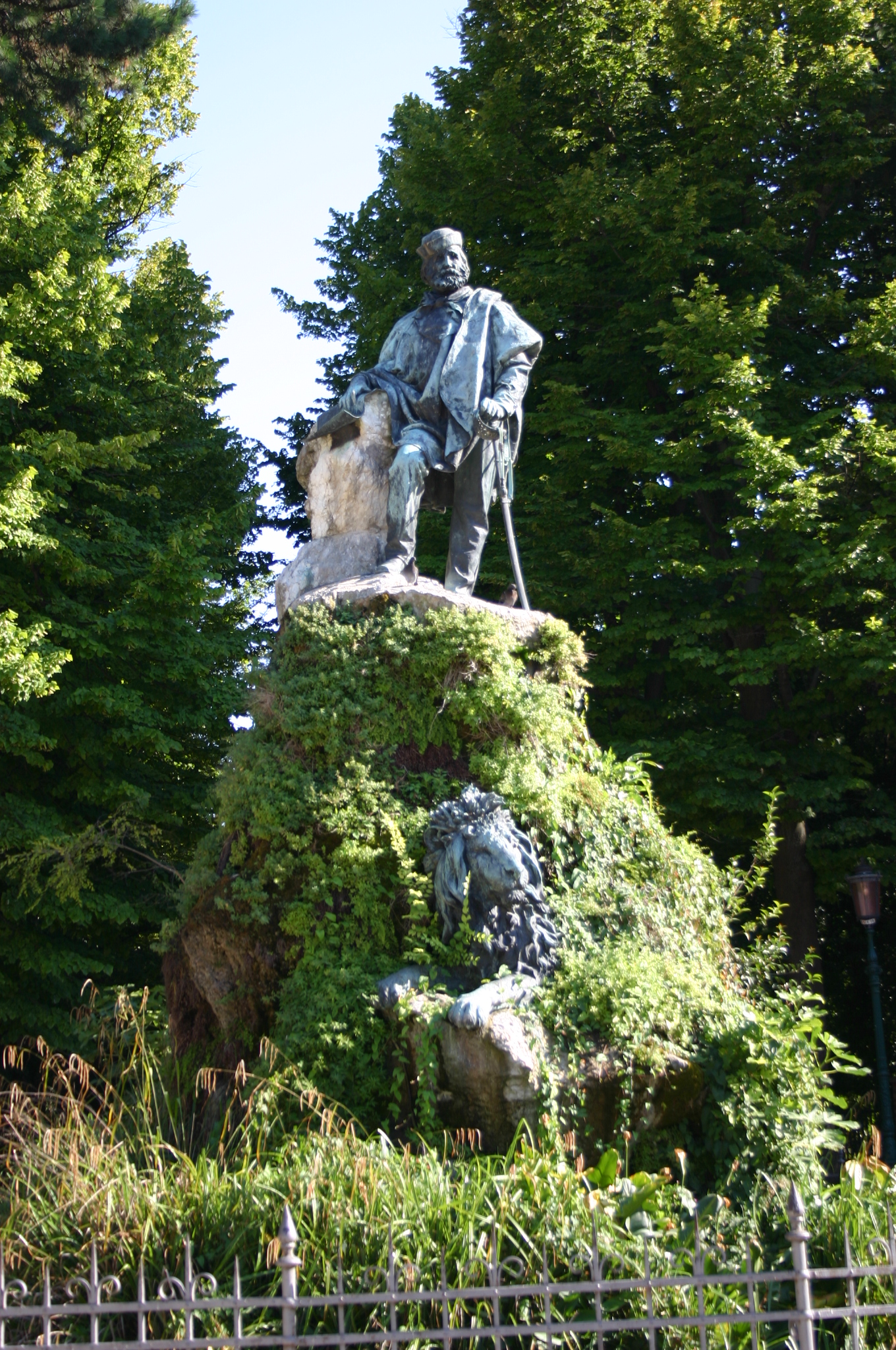
Monument to Garibaldi, Venice

== Biography ==
Born to a poor family, he was apprenticed first as a wood engraver, where he learned also to sculpt. Among his works are the Monument to Giorgione (1878) in Castelfranco Veneto, the Monument to Vittorio Emanuele (1880) in Vicenza, the Monument to the Army (1885) in the Riva degli Schiavoni of Venice, and also the Monument to Garibaldi (1887) in Venice, and a statue depicting Berta che fila, exhibited in Vienna in 1888, once belonged to Senator Alessandro Rossi of Schio. He also completed the statues in front of the Theater of Fiume. he completed a number of bronze portrait busts. He completed a bust of the Innominato (1881). His Monument of the Army in Venice depicts a soldier saving a woman and child, recalling the efforts of the army during a flood of 1882. He died in extreme poverty.
