= Gianni Benvenuti =

Italian artist, painter, illustrator, sculptor (1926–2005)

- Born: Giovanni Benvenuti; 26 June 1926; Pisa, Italy
- Died: 15 September 2005 (aged 79); Philadelphia, Pennsylvania, US
- Education: Vittorio Veneto Scientific Lyceum; University of Milan (architecture)
- Years active: 1950s to 2005
- Known for: painting, sculpture, printmaking, illustration, cartooning
- Spouse: Elfie Harris

Giovanni "Gianni" Benvenuti (26 June 1926 – 15 September 2005), commonly known as Benvenuti, (Note: For many of the children's books he illustrated, he is simply known as "Benvenuti".) was an Italian artist whose career spanned multiple decades and diverse art forms, including painting, sculpture, printmaking, illustration, and comics. His work earned recognition across Europe and the United States. He is best known for his work as an illustrator of children's books, having done illustrations for classics such as Grimms' Fairy Tales, Winnie the Pooh, and Mother Goose.

== Life and career ==
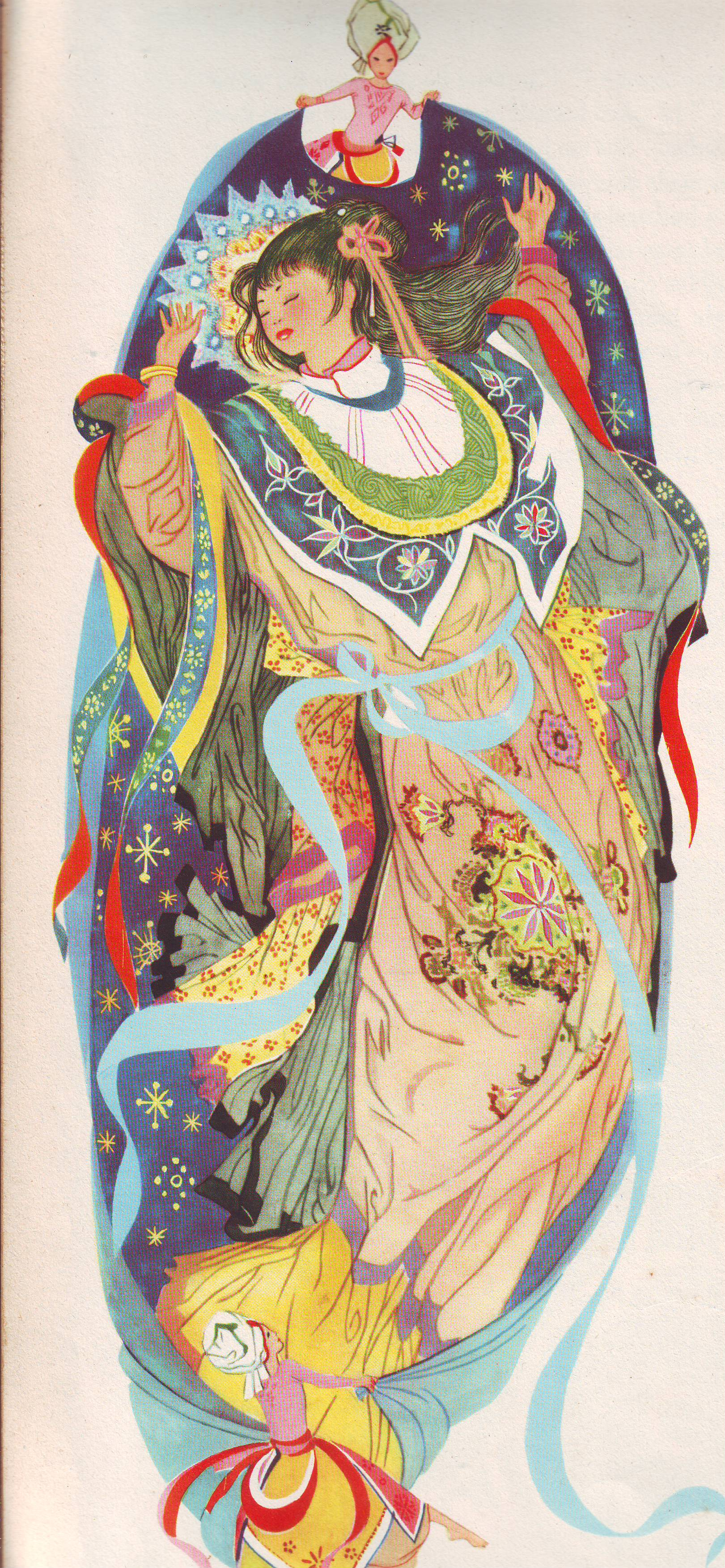
Benvenuti illustration from Le Mille e una Notte

Giovanni Benvenuti was born on 26 June 1926 in Pisa, Italy, to Lida (née Pistelli) and Francesco Benvenuti. During World War II, his family relocated to Milan, where he completed his studies at the Vittorio Veneto Scientific Lyceum. He later attended the University of Milan, where he studied architecture, a discipline that would influence his work in the visual arts.

Benvenuti began his career as cartoonist for the Italian publishing house Arnoldo Mondadori Editore, with an adaptation of L'Ultimo dei Mohicani for in their comic Topolino. He continued working for Mondadori, illustrating Gli Albi d'Oro (Golden Books) short stories. By the 1950s, Benvenuti gained prominence as an illustrator of children's books. He illustrated over fifty books. His works included The Bible, Winnie the Pooh, Don Quixote, Grimms' Fairy Tales, and Mother Goose. These works were translated into numerous languages. Benvenuti was featured in the Italian National Catalogue of Sculpture, the History of Italian Art in the 1900s, and the Illustrations and Cartoonists of the 1950s.

In 1975, Benvenuti moved to Pietrasanta, a town known for its tradition in marble and bronze sculpting. There, he shifted his focus to sculpture, a medium that defined much of his later work. He played a role in founding Scultori e Artigiani in un Centro Storico, an annual sculpture exhibition in Pietrasanta, which showcased works from Europe's sculptors. Benvenuti continued to direct this exhibition until 1980.

In 1980, Benvenuti moved to the United States, where he married artist Elfie Harris. In 1981, they established Harris Benvenuti Inc., a design studio and gallery in Philadelphia. The studio, located in a converted American Legion building, became a center for the couple's artistic endeavors. During his years in the United States, his work centred around sculpture, painting, and design projects. Benvenuti's artistic style evolved throughout his career. His early works were more monochromatic and figurative, while his later pieces were more colourful and abstract. Similarly, his sculptures, which initially "were jagged with aggressive lines", became more simplified and abstract over time.

== Death ==
Benvenuti died from stomach cancer on 15 September 2005 at his home in Philadelphia. He was survived by his wife, Elfie Harris.

=== Legacy ===
Benvenuti is recognized as a significant figure in 20th-century Italian art. His work, encompassing painting, sculpture, printmaking, illustration, and comics, has been exhibited in major galleries across Italy, France, and the United States. His pieces are held in private collections and museums, including the Museum of Modern Italian Art in Milan. Following his death in 2005, Benvenuti's wife, Elfie Harris, initiated plans to establish a museum in their former studio in Germantown, Philadelphia, to honour his work.

== Selected illustrated books ==
Benvenuti is known for children's book illustrations, including:

- Goulden, Shirley (1950). Tales from the Arabian Nights. Illustrated by Benvenuti. Grosset & Dunlap. ASIN B002ESBQMM.
- King, Léon (1959). The Enchanted Princess and Other Fairy Tales. Illustrated by Benvenuti. Golden Press. ISBN 978-1258520427.
- Andersen, Hans Christian (1959). The Hans Christian Andersen Fairy Tale Book. Illustrated by Benvenuti. Golden Press. ASIN B00118XENK.
- Milan, Fabbri (1960). Japanese Fairy Tales A Giant Golden Book. Illustrated by Benvenuti. Golden Press. ASIN B0011809JW.
- Pyle, Howard (1962). The Merry Adventures of Robin Hood. Illustrated by Benvenuti. Golden Press. LCCN 62009848.
- Dalmais, Anne-Marie (1972). 101 Animal Stories, A Golden Book. Illustrated by Benvenuti. Golden Press. ASIN B000TFQJ1K.
- Dalmais, Anne-Marie (1972). Mr. Porcupine's Marvelous Flying Machine (A Golden Book). Illustrated by Benvenuti. Golden Press. ISBN 978-1122705882.
- Ponsot, Marie (1973). Russian Fairy Tales. Illustrated by Benvenuti. Golden Press. ASIN B000H8AAU0.
- Carruth, Jane (1977). The Golden Book of Grimms Fairy Tales. Illustrated by Benvenuti. Golden Press. ISBN 0307165434.
- Rhymes from Mother Goose. New York: Illustrated by Benvenuti. Knopf. 1980. LCCN 79018898.
