= Benvenuto =

Benvenuto may refer to:

== People ==
- Andrea Koch Benvenuto (born 1985), Chilean tennis player
- Benvenuto Cellini (1500–1571), Italian goldsmith, painter, sculptor, soldier and musician
- Benvenuto Rambaldi da Imola (circa 1320–1388), Italian writer
- Benvenuto Tisi (1481–1559), Italian painter
- Giorgio Benvenuto (born 1937), Italian politician
- Pietro Benvenuto (1769–1844), Italian painter
- Pietro Benvenuto degli Ordini (15th century), Italian architect
- Emil Benvenuto (1931–2011), American businessman and politician

== Music ==
- "Benvenuto" (song), a 2011 song by Italian singer-songwriter Laura Pausini
- "Benvenuto", song by Vasco Rossi Nessun Pericolo...Per Te 1996
