= Giuseppe Campos Venuti =

Italian architect and urban planner (1926–2019)

- Born: 3 August 1926; Rome, Kingdom of Italy
- Died: 29 September 2019 (aged 93); Bologna, Italy
- Education: Sapienza University of Rome
- Occupations: Architect, urban planner, academic

Giuseppe Campos Venuti (3 August 1926 – 29 September 2019) was an Italian architect, urban planner and academic. One of the leading figures in post-war Italian urban planning, he taught at the Polytechnic University of Milan and developed reform-oriented master plans for several cities, notably Bologna, as well as Florence, Naples and Madrid. He also served as president of the National Institute of Urban Planning (INU) from 1992 to 1993.

== Selected publications ==
- Amministrare l'urbanistica (1967)
- Urbanistica e austerità (1978)
- La terza generazione dell'urbanistica (1987)
- Cinquant'anni di urbanistica in Italia (1993)
