= Renaissance in Ferrara =

Aspect of the Italian Renaissance

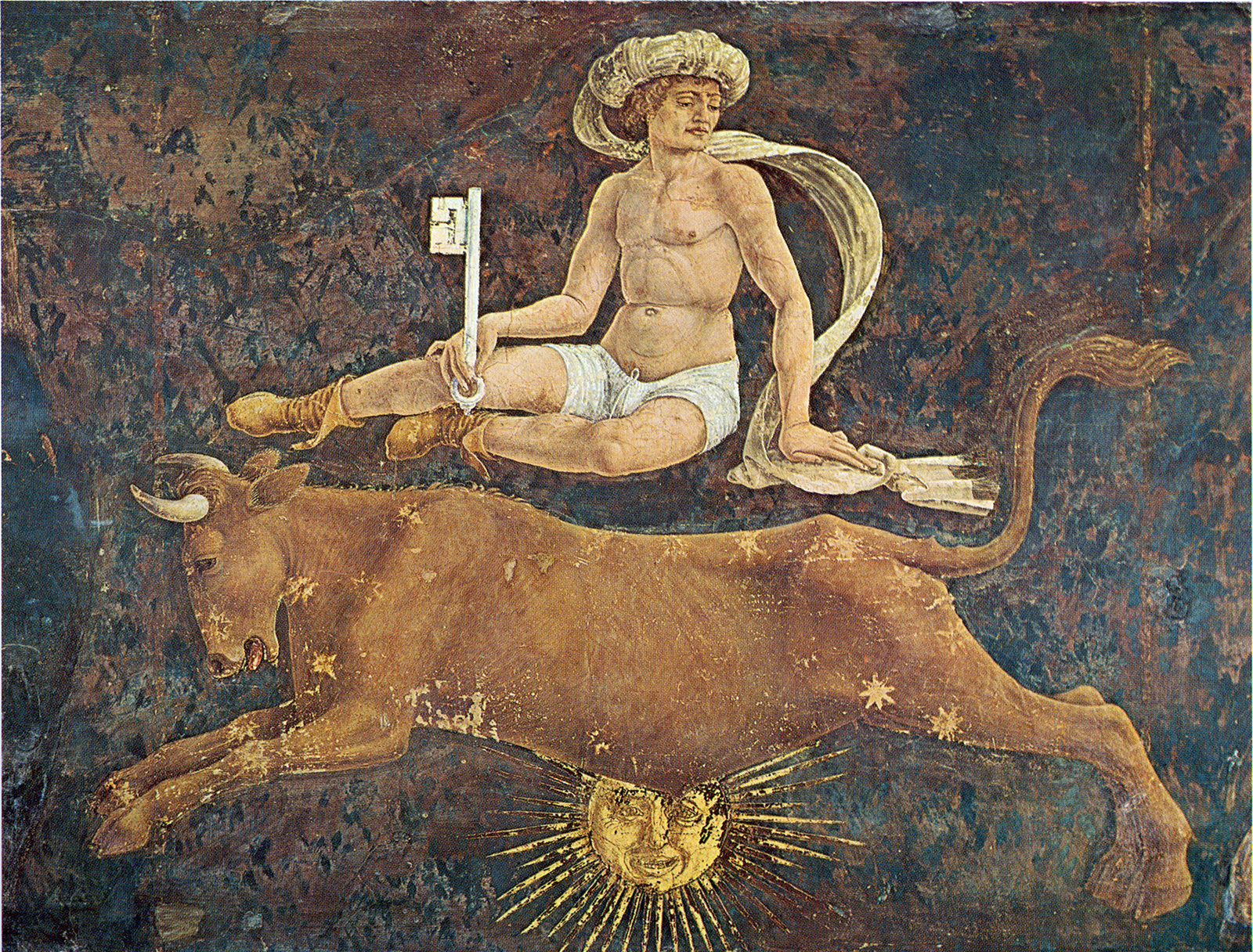
Francesco del Cossa, April, Salone dei Mesi, Palazzo Schifanoia

The Renaissance in the Italian city of Ferrara is considered to have begun with the rule of Leonello d'Este in around the mid-15th century. Under Leonello's patronage, Ferrara became a hub for the arts and intellectual thought, attracting prominent artists and scholars. A significant contribution came from the Ferrarese school of painters, including Cosmè Tura, Francesco del Cossa, and Ercole de' Roberti. These artists were known for their use of innovative colours, intricate detail, and emotive expressions, and are considered influential figures in defining early Italian Renaissance art.

The 16th century witnessed the emergence of another branch of the Ferrarese artistic school, led by Dosso Dossi, who became known for his imaginative and often fantasy-driven depictions of landscapes. In addition to painting, Ferrara developed into a vibrant center for literature, music, and architecture. The Este family supported artists, poets, and musicians, contributing to the development of this cultural environment.

== History ==
The House of Este established its presence in Ferrara in the late 14th century, when the nobleman Niccolò d'Este funded the University of Ferrara and started the construction of the Castello Estense. The family cultivated an interest in courtly literature, as evidenced by their library's collection of chivalric stories, which reflected an interest in the world of medieval fable. Texts on astrology and esotericism were also prominently represented in the collection.

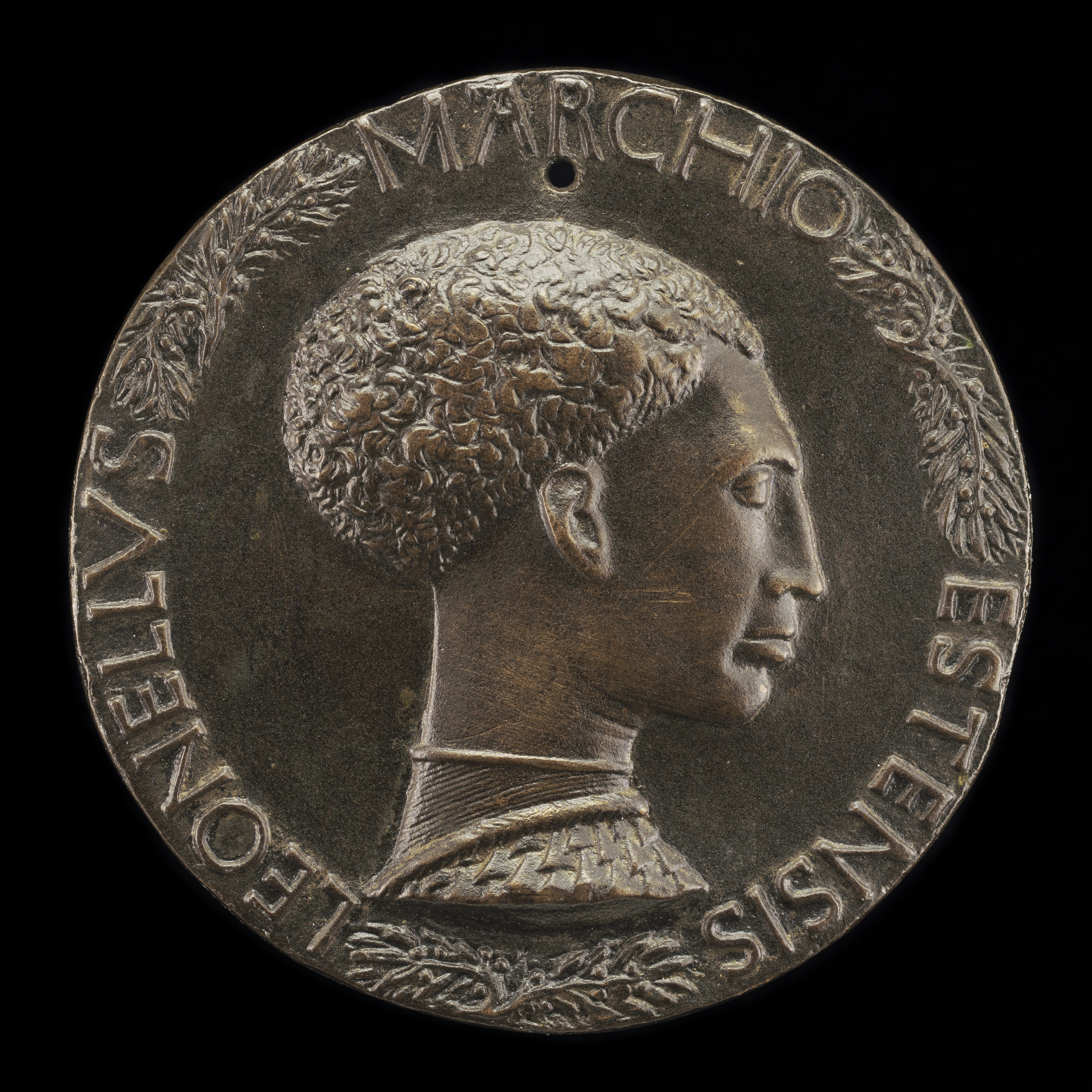
Pisanello's first medal of Leonello d'Este (1441–1443)

Artistic pursuits were widely patronised by the Este family. Pisanello (Antonio Pisano), for example, produced several medals for Leonello d'Este, the Marquess of Ferrara, Modena and Reggio in the mid-15th century, and was highly regarded by his contemporaries. The Este court also supported both the ornate international style, exemplified by Belbello da Pavia (creator of the Bible of Niccolò d'Este), and the humanist style, represented by Taddeo Crivelli (creator of the Bible of Borso d'Este).

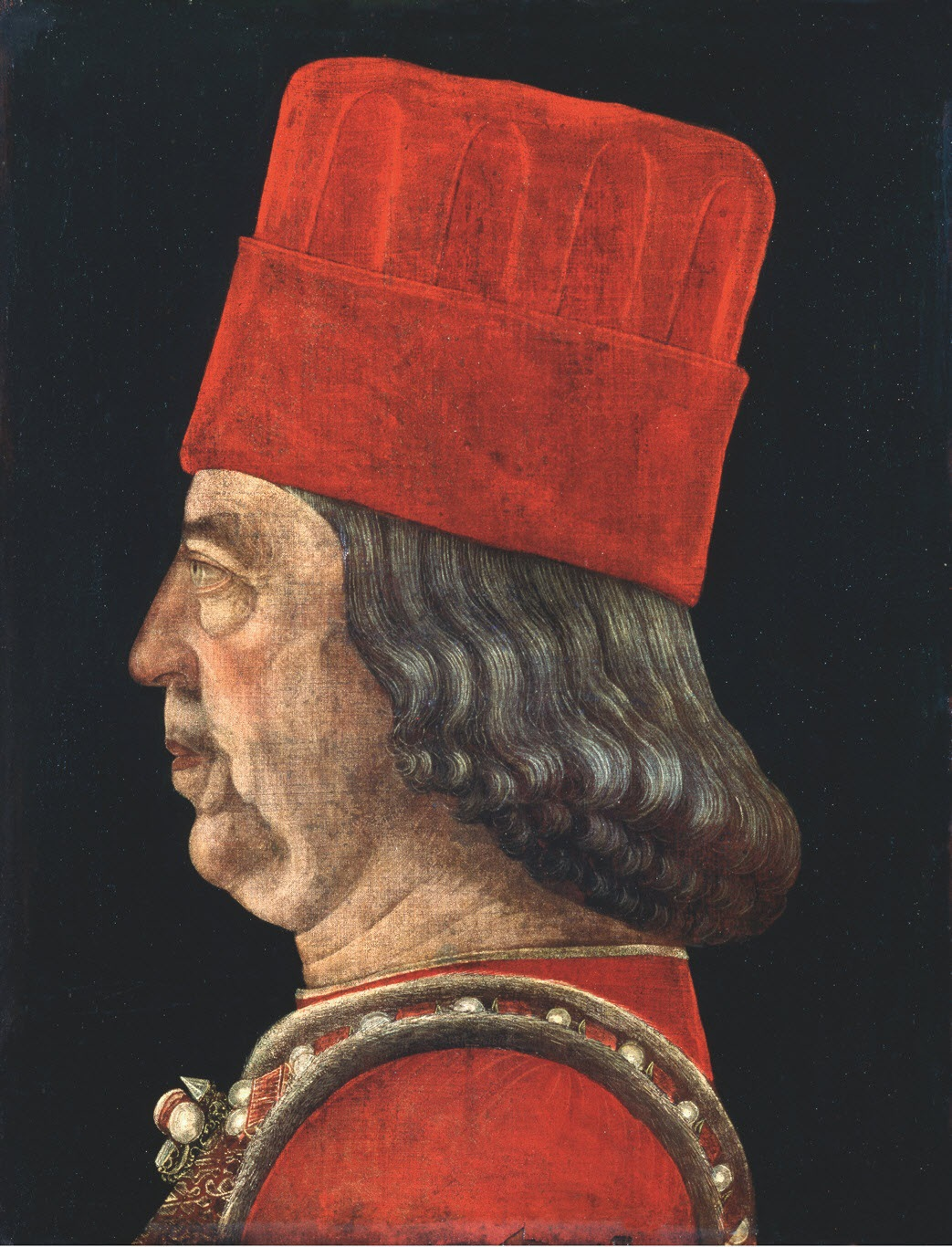
Baldassarre d'Este, Portrait of Borso d'Este

The reign of Leonello d'Este (1441–1450) further expanded the House of Este's cultural influence. His patronage encompassed a wide range of emerging artistic movements and humanist scholarship within Renaissance Italy. Educated by the humanist Guarino Veronese, Leonello cultivated relationships with prominent artists of the time, including Leon Battista Alberti, Jacopo Bellini, Piero della Francesca, and Andrea Mantegna (who was active in Ferrara between 1449 and 1451) and Pisanello. He also established a collection of antiquities and a tapestry manufactory, strengthening ties with Flanders. Several Northern artists, such as Rogier van der Weyden and Jean Fouquet, were resident in Ferrara during this period. The Este collections, containing works by these artists, also attracted the attention of visiting Italian artists, facilitating a dialogue between the internationalist and humanist artistic schools.

== Painting ==
During the rule of Borso d'Este (1450–1471) a distinct local style of Ferrarese painting developed, incorporating a number of artistic influences. This style fused courtly influences with elements associated with the works of Piero della Francesca, particularly his use of perspective and light. The meticulous realism of Early Netherlandish painters and the influence of Donatello are also evident. Artists trained in the workshop of Francesco Squarcione further contributed to this movement. Ferrarese artists elaborated upon this approach, integrating characteristics such as defined lines, heightened emotional expression and a fusion of elegance and expressiveness.

=== The Studiolo di Belfiore ===
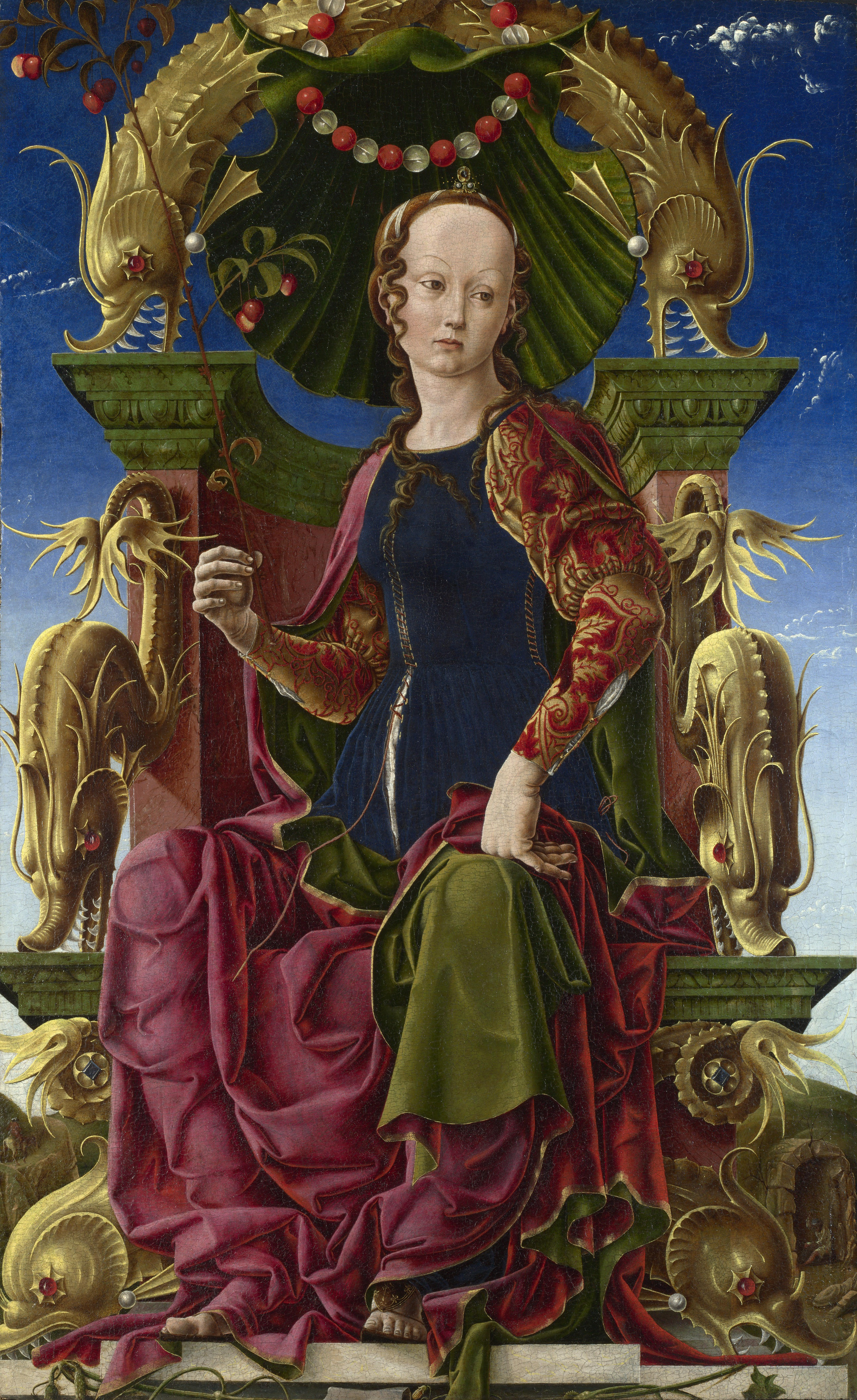
Cosmè Tura, Calliope, National Gallery, London

The development of the school of Ferrara is documented in surviving decorations from the Studiolo di Belfiore. Commissioned by Leonello d'Este, the Studiolo was completed during the reign of Borso following the dismantling of the Delizia di Belfiore palace. These decorations included intarsia work by the da Lendinara brothers (Lorenzo and Cristoforo Canozzi) and a cycle of panel paintings depicting the Muses, which were dispersed or destroyed after the disappearance of the palace.

Michele Pannonio's Thalia exemplifies the stylistic features of the Ferrarese school. The painting's slender figure and folded drapery reflect the influence of the International Gothic style. The imposing throne and the ornate decoration also recall the Paduan Renaissance aesthetic.

Polyhymnia, once attributed to Francesco del Cossa, is now believed to be the work of an anonymous Ferrarese artist and indicates the influence of Piero della Francesca, particularly in its open landscape setting.

Cosmè Tura's Calliope incorporates several features that became characteristic of the Ferrarese school. The work employs a carefully structured perspective, a low-lying vantage point and an intricately detailed throne. The work integrates elements associated with the Paduan style of Francesco Squarcione, particularly in the use of light, giving a sense of heightened sense of tension.

=== Cosmè Tura ===
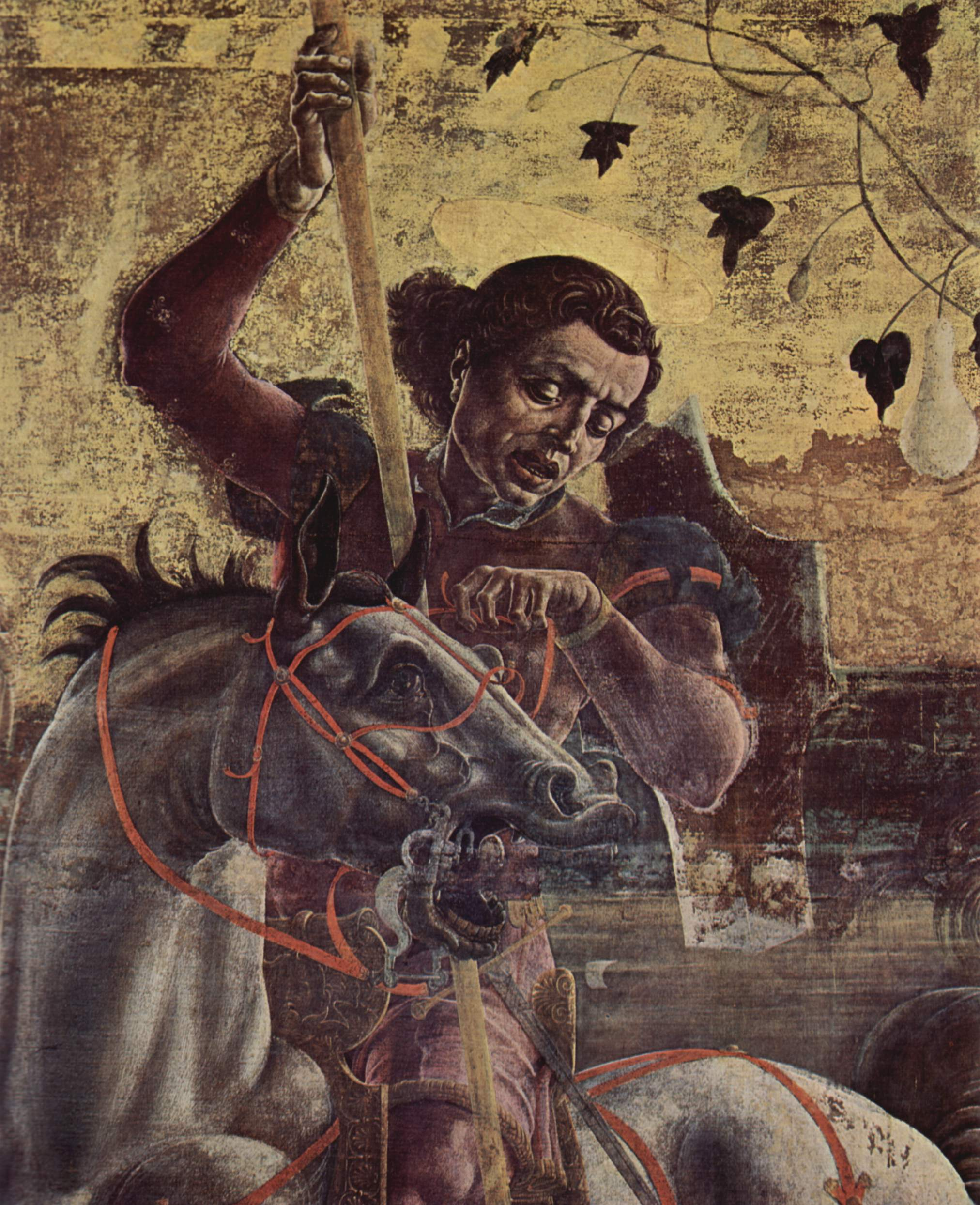
Cosmè Tura, Saint George, from the Ferrara Cathedral Organ Case

Cosmè Tura is considered the founder of the Ferrarese school. He was later joined by Francesco del Cossa and Ercole de' Roberti. Although the three artists' styles diverged somewhat, they all favoured carefully detailed figures, sharp profiles, and the liberal use of chiaroscuro that gave the illusion of materials resembling carved metal or polished stone.

Cosmè Tura's artistic style is visible in the Ferrara Cathedral Organ Case, completed in 1469. This double-sided work depicts the Annunciation when opened and Saint George and the Princess when closed. The architectural elements of the Annunciation recall the influence of Andrea Mantegna, particularly in the sculptural draper and rocky background. The work closely pays attention to natural detail. The planetary bas-reliefs below the arches are likely to be a reference to the culture of the Ferrarese court. Tura combines these influences into a cohesive artwork, without surrendering the composition's unity. In the Saint George and the Princess panel, sharp outlines, strong highlights and exaggerated facial features and depictions of animals present the scene as replete with energy and emotional intensity.

=== Francesco del Cossa ===
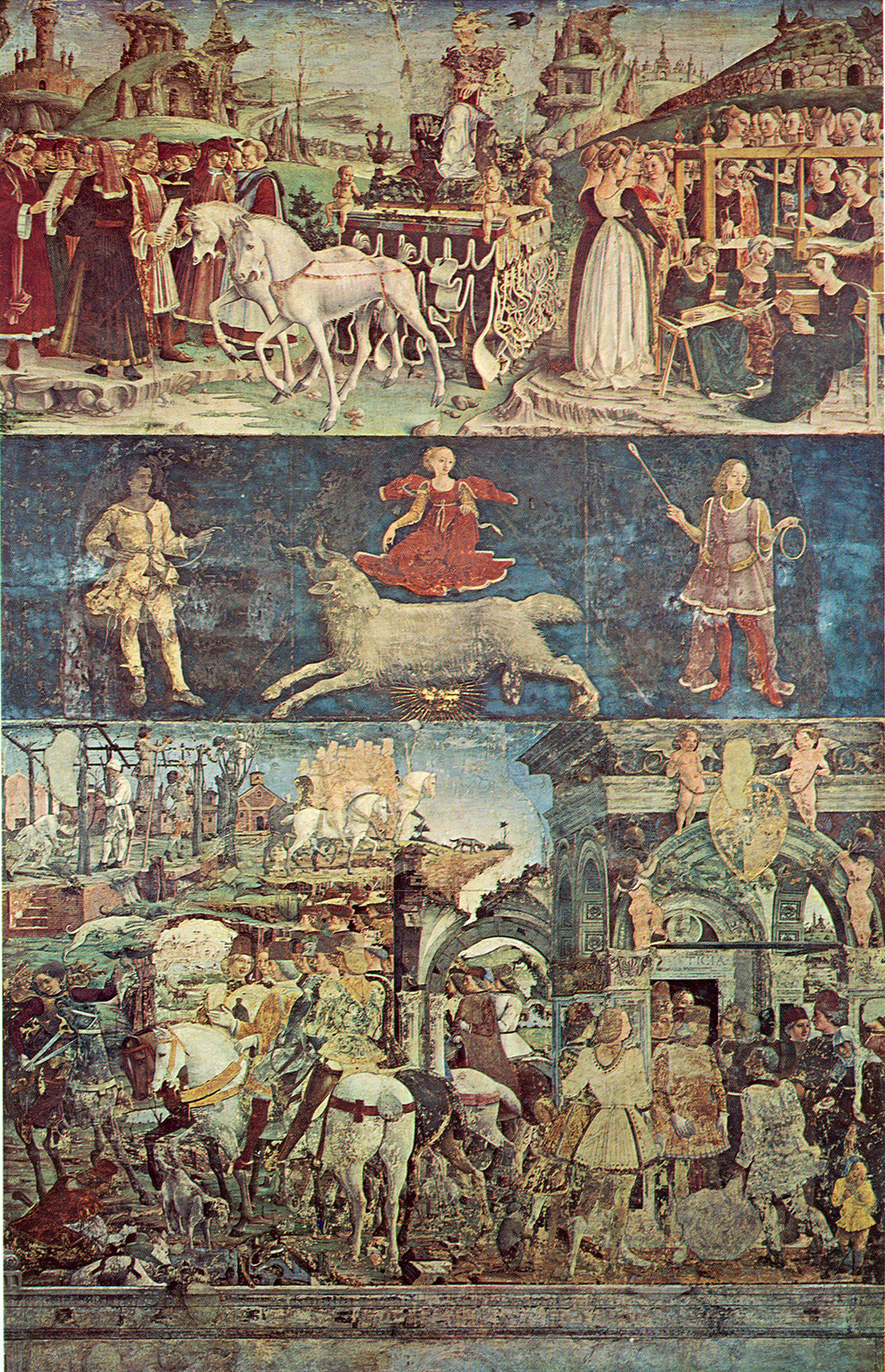
Francesco del Cossa, March

Francesco del Cossa trained under Cosmè Tura but gradually developed his own artistic style. He was more strongly influenced by Piero della Francesca, resulting in more composed and monumental figures. Although it remains unclear whether del Cossa worked on the Studiolo of the Palazzo Belfiore, he verifiably took part in the other major Ferrarese painted scheme of this time, the frescoes of the Salone dei Mesi in Palazzo Schifanoia. Several artists participated in the fresco cycle, probably under the direction of Cosmè Tura. Pellegrino Prisciani designed the program, incorporating ideas from astronomy, philosophy and literature.

The decoration originally comprised twelve sections, one for each month, of which only seven survive today. Each section is divided into three levels: the upper tier depicts that month's patron deity, surrounded by activities associated with the month. The central section, set against a blue background, displays the zodiac sign and three decans (astrological subdivisions). The lower level showcases scenes associated with Borso d'Este. Through glorifying Borso d'Este and his governance, the frescoes served to celebrate Ferrara's civic and political character.

Francesco del Cossa's frescoes in the Salone dei Mesi clearly show these differences exemplifies this distinction. His March fresco applies simplified forms, luminous colours and a carefully organised perspective. Unlike Tura's characteristically stylized, if not rigid, figures, del Cossa's forms appear more natural and steadier.

=== Ercole de' Roberti ===
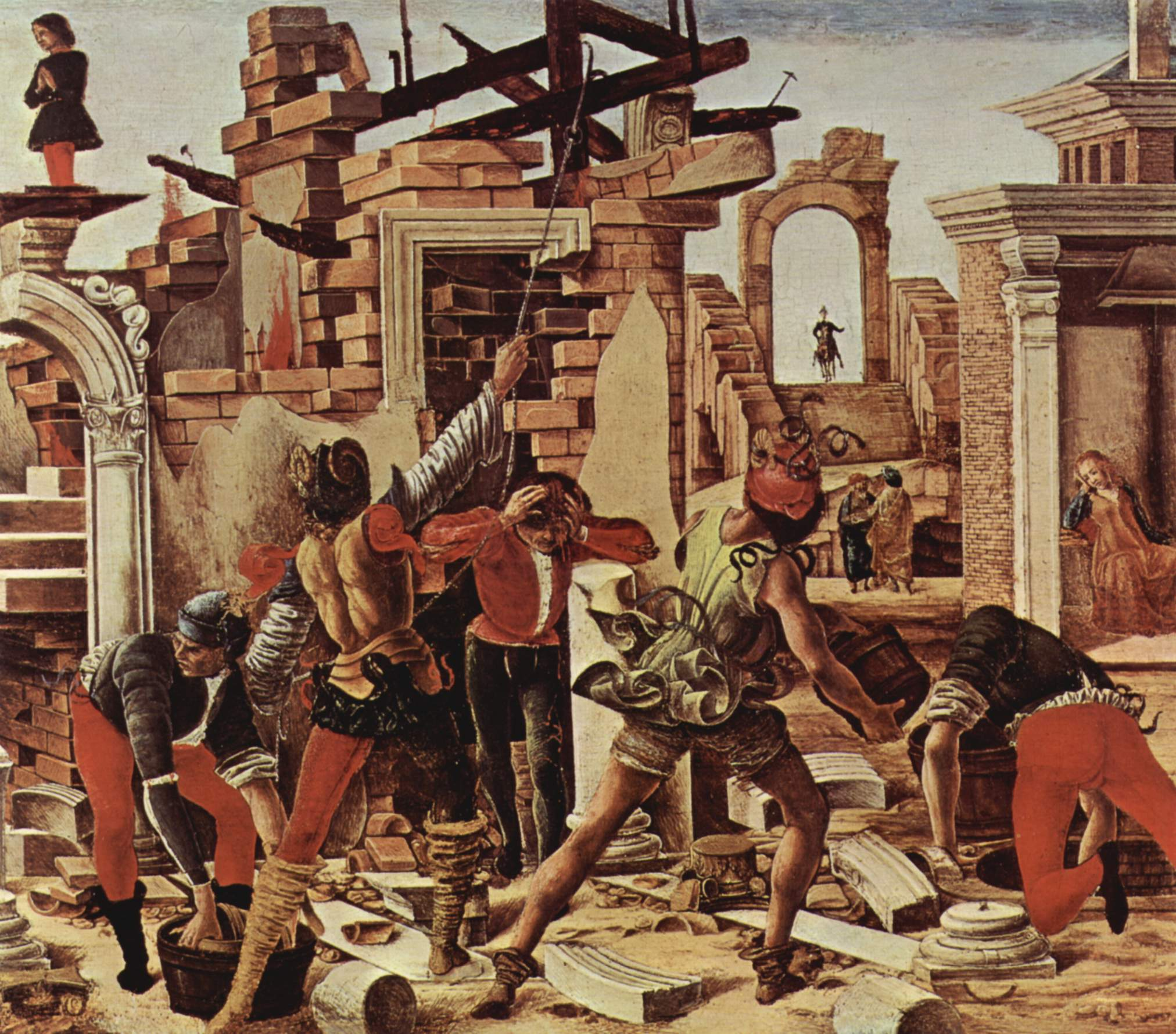
Details of the Miracles of Saint Vincent Ferrer from the Griffoni Polyptych

The third prominent figure of the Ferrarese school is Ercole de' Roberti, who also contributed to the Salone dei Mesi. The September fresco attributed to him uses geometric forms and energetic figures which inject an unusual dynamism into the scene. Sharp, tense contours convey the forceful energy, even as it departs from more naturalistic representation.

Ercole de' Roberti's Stories of Saint Vincent Ferrer panels, painted in 1473, reveal the development of his style. The architecture is more orderly and carefully arranged than in the artist's earlier paintings. Nonetheless, Roberti retained broken figure outlines, sharply folded drapery and dreamlike landscapes. When taken together, these characteristics create an unsettling sentiment that captured the growing tensions in the late 15th century, including a questioning of Renaissance ideals.

The Santa Maria in Porto Altarpiece (executed between 1479 and 1481) in the church of Santa Maria in Porto near Ravenna adopts a very different approach. In this work, most of the emotional intensity is restricted to several bas-reliefs at the base of the Virgin's throne. The composition instead projects a calm balance through the use of symmetrical colour arrangements. The animated structure of the throne introduces movement and opens onto a landscape below. The lower section alludes to the mythical foundation of the church and features marble columns painted with delicate attention to light.

=== 16th century ===
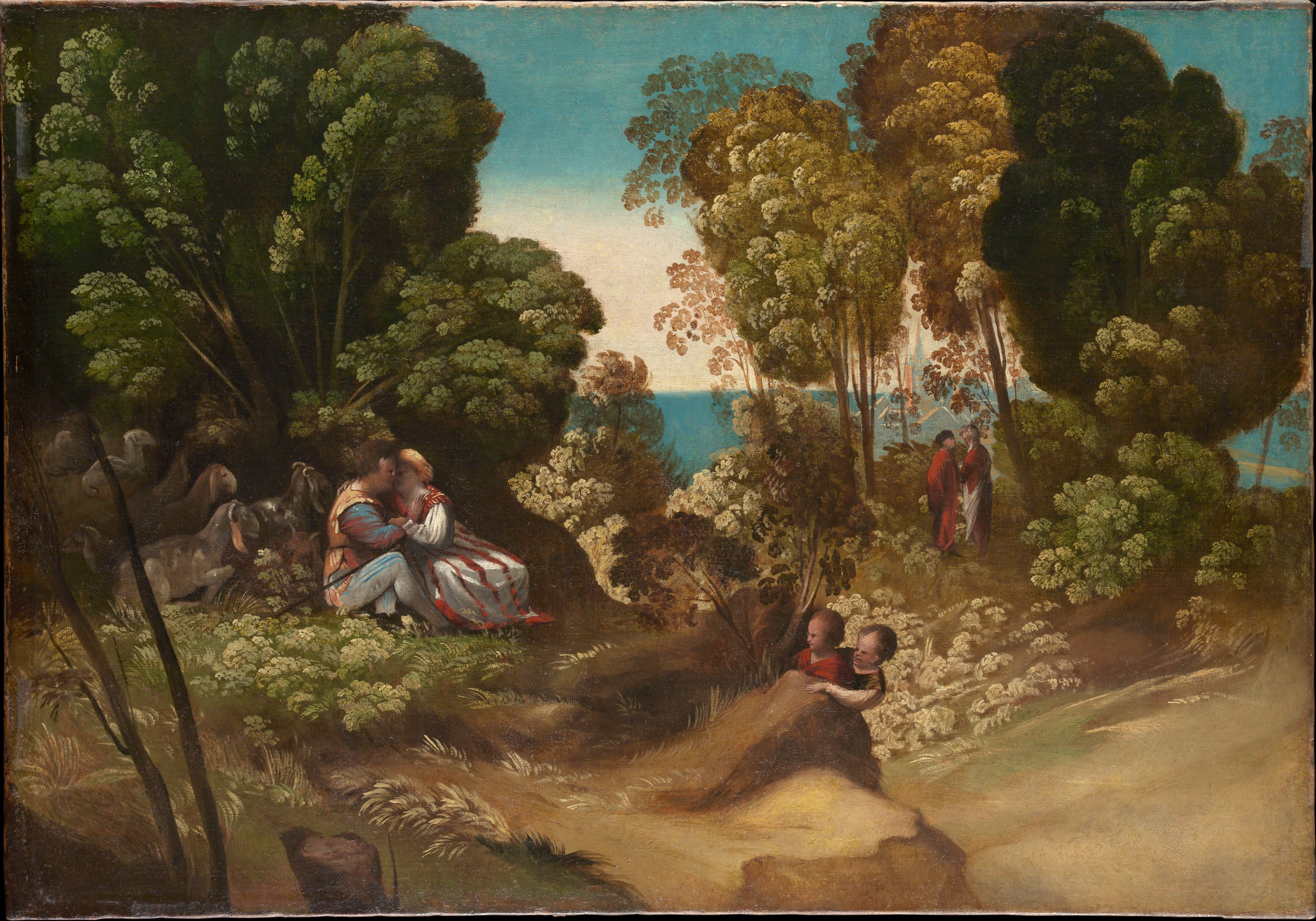
Dosso Dossi, Three Ages of Man (1515)

The artistic lineage established by the 15th-century masters of the Ferrarese school had waned by the 1590s, with a decline in the production of high-caliber artworks. At the turn of the 16th century, the House of Este began to patronize artists with diverse training backgrounds. These artists were familiar with the latest artistic developments of the Roman and Venetian Renaissance. The major court painters of this period were Il Garofalo, Ludovico Mazzolino, and Dosso Dossi. The presence of writers such as Ludovico Ariosto cultivated an atmosphere that favored fantastical imagery, a trend particularly evident in the design of Alfonso II d'Este's extraordinary studiolo and the camerini d'alabastro which was destroyed in 1598. Directed by Dosso Dossi, the decoration of the camerini included a series of remarkable Baccanali canvases by various artists including Giovanni Bellini and Titian. Dosso's style demonstrably absorbed certain elements from Titian, such as a rich colour palette and expansive landscapes. However, Dosso also incorporated an inventive approach, particularly in his depictions of literary and mythological subjects. These mythological motifs by Dosso remained influential even for early 17th-century Emilian painters, such as Annibale Carracci.

Lorenzo Costa, another prominent painter, established himself as the court painter in Mantua following the death of Andrea Mantegna.

The latter half of the 16th century witnessed a period of artistic transition in Ferrara. Following the death of Dosso Dossi and the decline in commissions from the Este court, the artistic community maintained a degree of vitality. This was due in part to the presence of the Filippi family. Among them, Sebastiano Filippi, also known as Bastianino, achieved recognition for his Last Judgment adorning the apse of Ferrara Cathedral. Later, the local artistic scene benefited from the contributions of Carlo Bononi. However, with the annexation of Ferrara by the Papal States and the subsequent transfer of the Este capital to Modena, the city's prominence as a leading artistic center diminished. This decline coincided with the dismantling of the famed camerini d'alabastro, resulting in the dispersal of its decorative elements to various museums.

== Architecture and urban planning ==
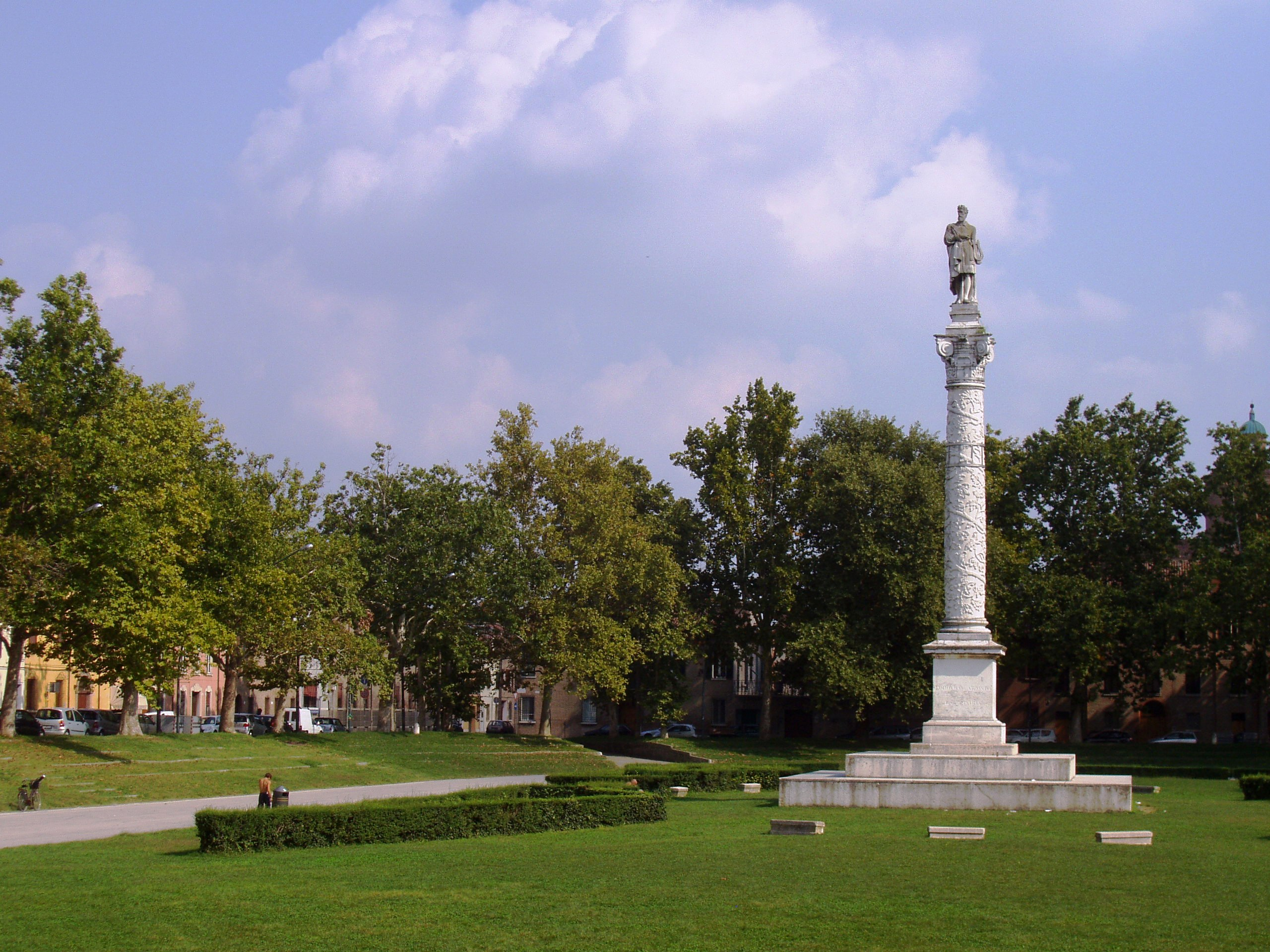
Piazza Ariostea

In 1443, Leonello d'Este commissioned Leon Battista Alberti to design the bell tower of the Duomo and to arrange the base of the equestrian monument to Niccolò III. However, Alberti's influence on the city's architectural landscape remained limited. The overall character of Ferrara's architecture continued to be defined by the late 14th-century tradition, particularly evident in the use of decorative terracotta. Due to defensive needs and the growing demand for housing, the interventions in the city by the Este focused mainly on urban planning issues rather than the construction of individual buildings. Ferrara was a medieval city with a core of narrow, winding streets, with squares and enclosed to the south by the Po di Volano and to the north by the Giovecca canal, with the only landmarks being the Duomo, the Este residence and the Castle of San Michele.

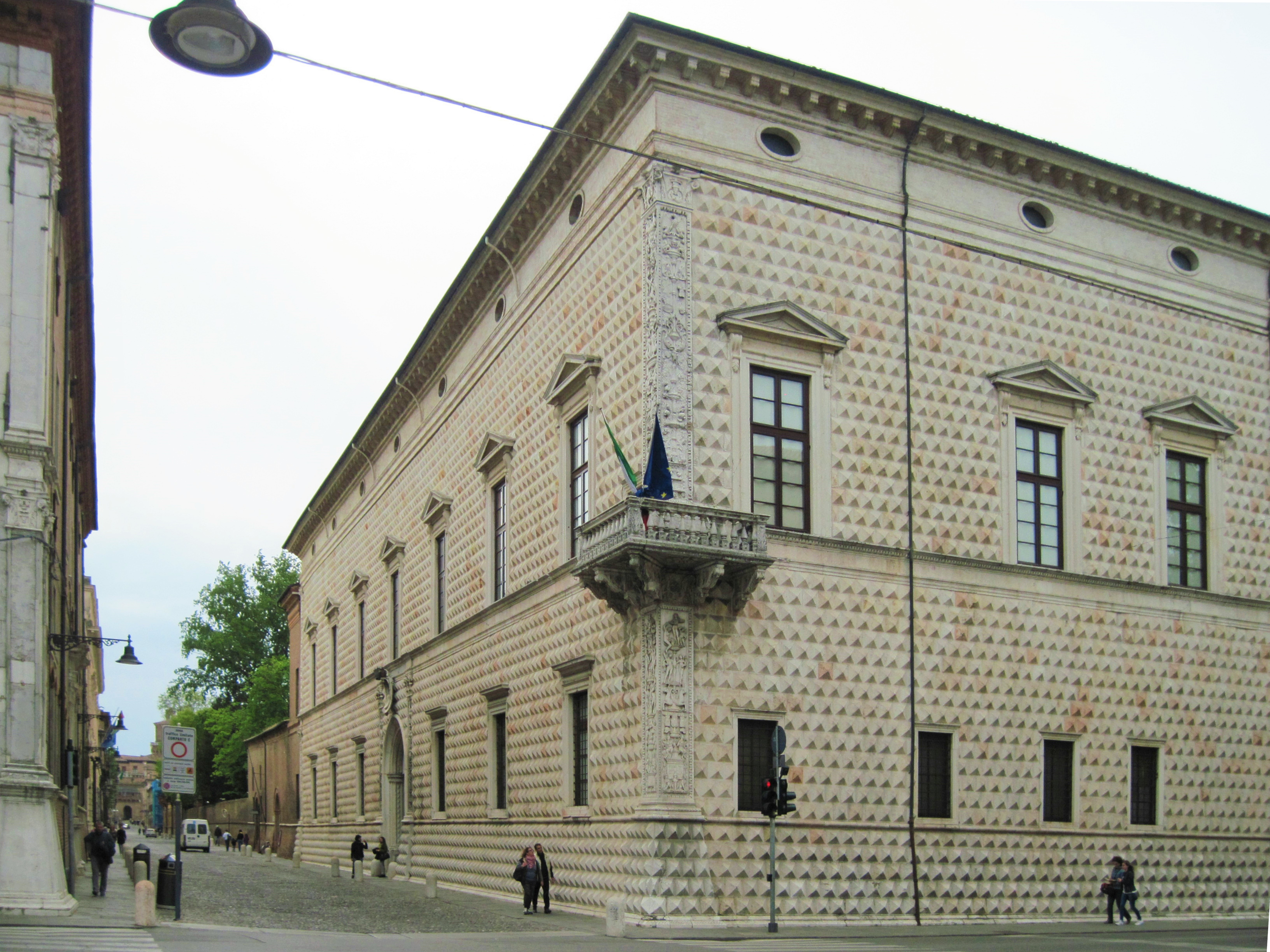
Palazzo dei Diamanti

The mid-15th century witnessed the city's first significant expansion under the rule of Borso d'Este. However, it was Ercole I who spearheaded a transformative urban planning project heavily influenced by the Renaissance concept of the "ideal city." This project, known today as the Addizione Erculea, is recognized as one of the earliest examples of its kind in Europe and has contributed to Ferrara's designation as a UNESCO World Heritage Site. Ercole commissioned the architect Biagio Rossetti to design a doubling of the city according to a new rational scheme, the Addizione Erculea.

The Giovecca canal was filled in and transformed into a wide avenue, the Corso della Giovecca. This thoroughfare served as a vital connection between the new and old quarters of the city. Regular extensions were designed at the intersections with existing medieval streets, facilitating a smooth merging of the old and new urban fabric. Drawing on the principles outlined by the Roman architect Vitruvius, the new city area was laid out in an orthogonal grid pattern. This rational approach resulted in a network of streets that intersected at right angles. The orthogonal grid was further defined by two principal axes: Via degli Angeli (today Corso Ercole I), which traced an earlier route connecting the Castello Estense and Belfiore, and Via dei Prioni, which ran from the Po Gate to the Sea Gate in an east-west direction. This particular axis, which was completely new and fully "public" (as opposed to the other axis that remained linked to the passage of the dukes), was particularly emphasized with a large square, Piazza Ariostea.

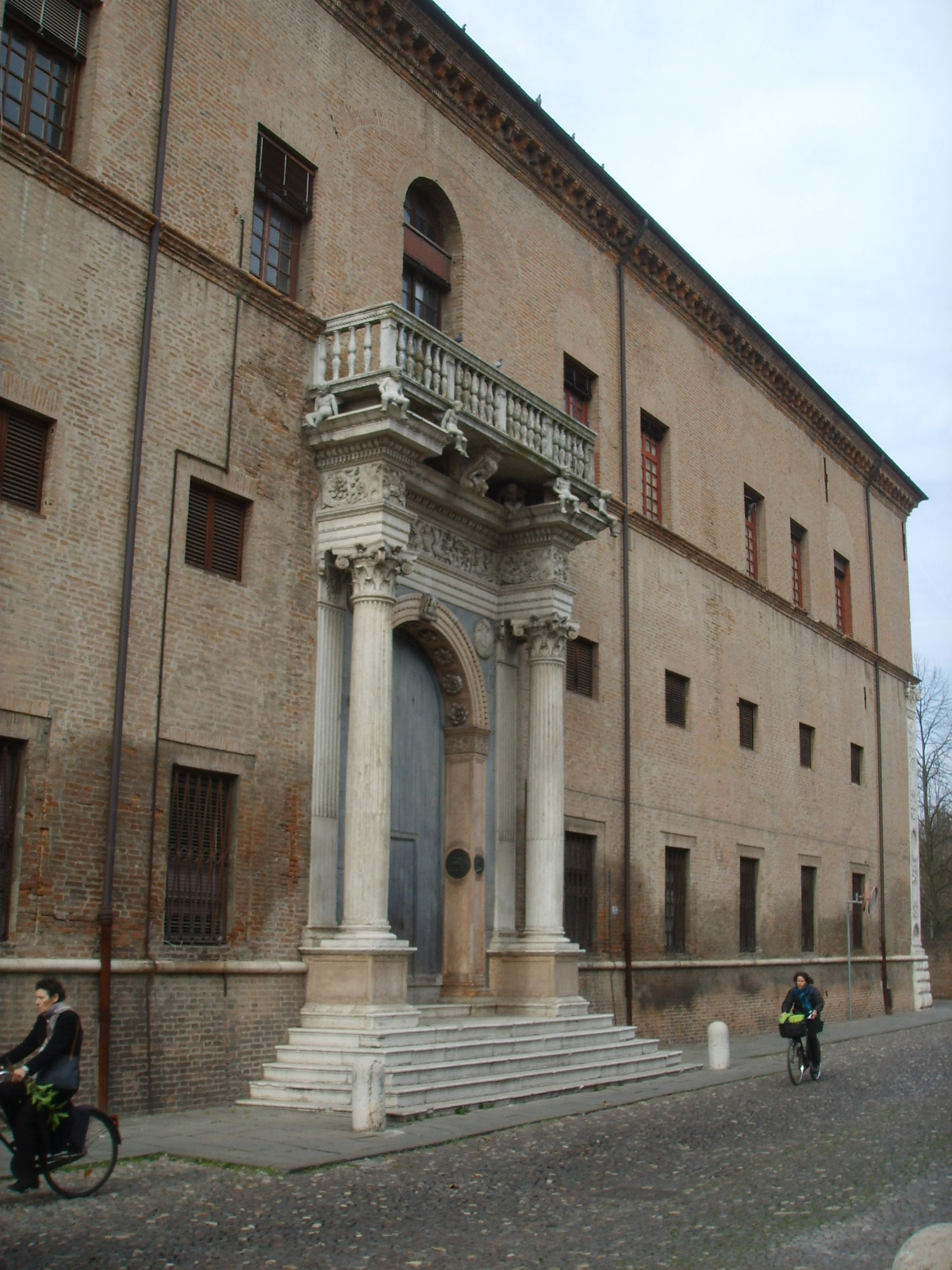
Palazzo Prosperi-Sacrati on the Quadrivio degli Angeli.

Biagio Rossetti, the architect behind the Addizione Erculea, incorporated several features to ensure a harmonious integration with the existing city. He strategically placed areas of green space throughout the new district. These green spaces functioned as transitional zones, easing the visual and spatial shift between the orthogonal grid of the new layout and the organic street patterns of the older city. The overall design of the Addizione Erculea prioritized the creation of contained and visually engaging architectural experiences rather than grand, open vistas at street ends. This approach fostered a sense of intimacy and encouraged exploration within the new city district. The intersection of the two main axes, Via degli Angeli and Via dei Prioni, is known as the Quadrivio degli Angeli and serves as a key example of Rossetti's design principles in action. Rossetti's most prominent structure within the Quadrivio is the Palazzo dei Diamanti, which derives its name from its unique facade, adorned with characteristic pointed stonework that creates a dynamic interplay of light and shadow. The corner facing the crossroads features ornately decorated slabs depicting candelabras and a projecting balcony. The architectural style of the surrounding buildings is less ostentatious. However, architects employed various elements such as large portals and corner pilasters to introduce subtle variations and visual interest within the overall urban fabric.

The urban layout implemented during the construction of the Addizione Erculea garnered significant recognition for its innovative and enduring qualities. When compared to other Italian and European cities of the period, Ferrara's urban fabric presented a distinct character. Unlike many contemporary urban centers, Ferrara lacked a clear spatial segregation between the areas controlled by the ruling class and those inhabited by the general population. This absence of a rigidly defined social hierarchy within the urban layout stands in contrast to cities like Mantua or Pienza, where a clear division between dominant and subordinate spaces existed. Ferrara's approach instead emphasized a harmonious integration of these sectors, allowing each to retain its own distinctive character. While the full development of the Addizione Erculea may have been envisioned for a later stage, factors such as limited population growth and a dynastic shift ultimately halted its complete realization. Despite this, the innovative and well-organized nature of the initial design has proven remarkably adaptable. Over the centuries, this new area of the city has successfully accommodated various urban changes, ensuring its continued relevance.

== See also ==
- Renaissance art
- Renaissance architecture

== Bibliography ==
- Pierluigi De Vecchi and Elda Cerchiari, I tempi dell'arte, volume 2, Bompiani, Milan 1999. ISBN 88-451-7212-0
- Stefano Zuffi, Il Quattrocento, Electa, Milan 2004. ISBN 88-370-2315-4
- Stefano Zuffi, Il Cinquecento, Electa, Milan 2005. ISBN 88-370-3468-7
- Stefano Zuffi, Grande atlante del Rinascimento, Electa, Milan 2007. ISBN 978-88-370-4898-3
