= Delizia di Belfiore =

Former Estense residence in Ferrara, Italy, destroyed in 1632

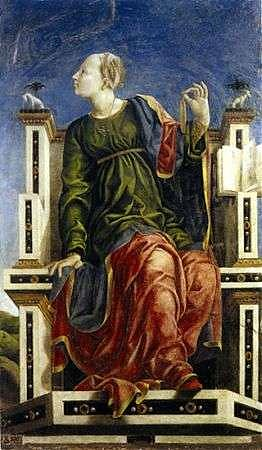
- Urania, from the Studiolo di Belfiore
- Interactive map of the Delizia di Belfiore area

General information
- Status: Disappeared
- Location: Ferrara, Italy
- Year built: c. 1391
- Destroyed: 1632
- Client: Estense

The Delizia di Belfiore was one of the "Delizie Estensi", monumental residences built by the Este family in Ferrara and its surroundings during their rule. At the time of its construction, it was considered one of the most important and representative.

== History ==
The cultural motivations behind the construction of this delizia align with the Estense court of Ferrara's custom, much more pronounced than that of the Medici in Florence, of residing in villas. The Delizia di Belriguardo and the villa of Consandolo were significant examples of this approach to the territory, and this Belfiore residence, then suburban, was a further confirmation.

The Delizia, which disappeared centuries ago, was located near the final stretch of corso Ercole I d'Este, northwest and a short distance from the church, also disappeared, of Santa Maria degli Angeli, Ferrara. It was built towards the end of the 14th century by Bartolino da Novara at the behest of Alberto V d'Este.

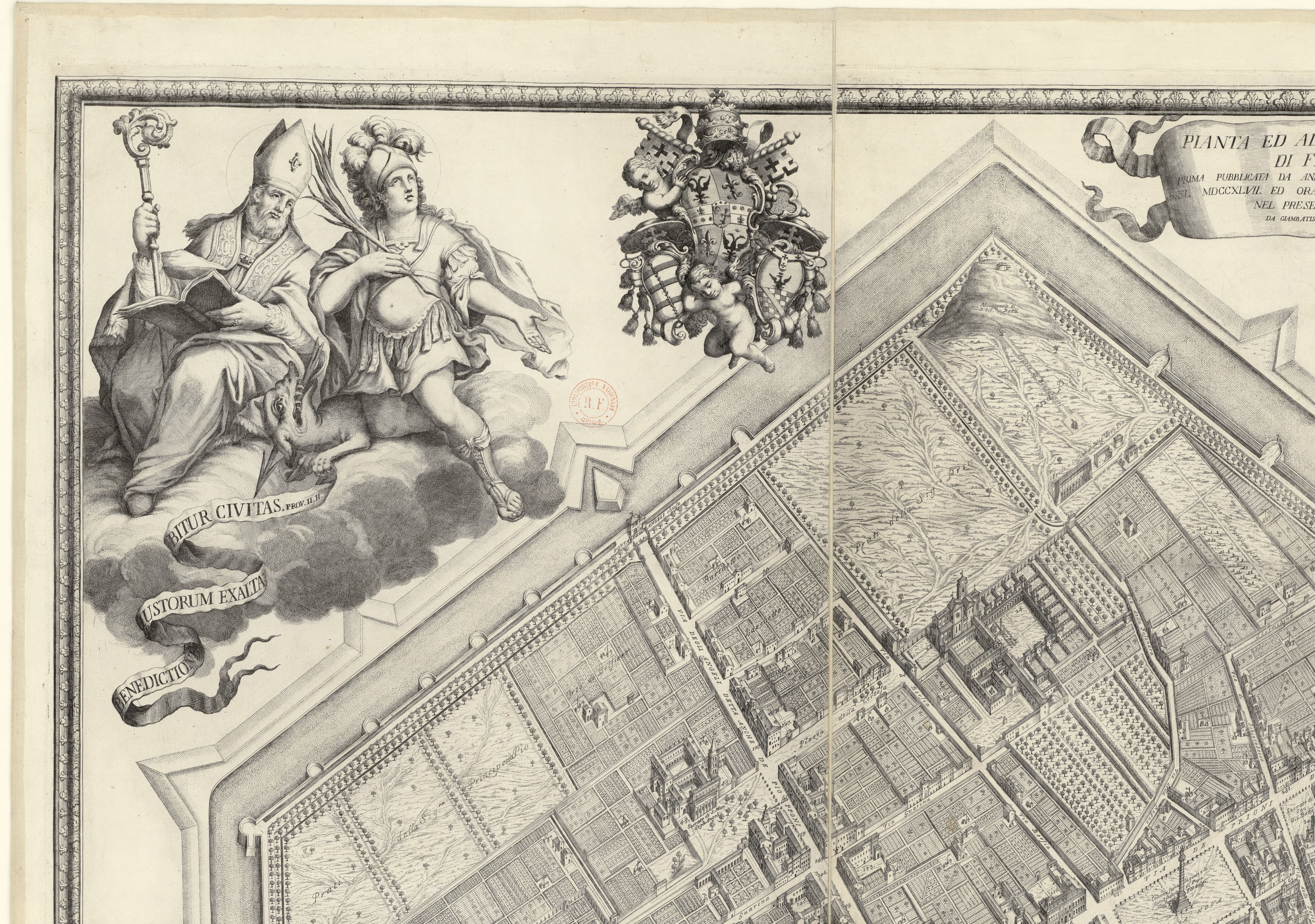
Plan and elevation of the city of Ferrara by Andrea Bolzoni. The site occupied by the Delizia, already gone at the time of the engraving, is marked as Orto di Belfiore.

It was used extensively by Leonello d'Este (who enriched it with his famous Studiolo di Belfiore) and later by his successor, Borso d'Este. During the war with the Serenissima, in 1493, it was occupied and heavily damaged. The Venetians, during certain moments of the conflict, advanced very close to the Walls of Ferrara, which at that time were further south, near the Castello Estense, and also occupied the church of Santa Maria degli Angeli and the Certosa complex, a convent where Borso had also built a small palace. It was almost completely destroyed by a fire in 1632.

== Description ==
It was built outside the city walls, surrounded by vegetation and gardens. Further north, the Barco park, a hunting reserve and leisure area for the nobles of the house and their guests, was later expanded and enriched. In the loggia of the entrance, there was a fresco depicting Marquis Alberto with his entourage engaged in a hunting expedition. Many artists worked at Belfiore, including Cosmè Tura, Francesco del Cossa, and Ercole de' Roberti. Ercole I surrounded the delizia with walls to make the stay safer and more private.

== Bibliography ==
- Gerolamo Melchiorri (2009). Carlo Bassi (ed.). Nomenclatura ed etimologia delle piazze e strade di Ferrara e Ampliamenti [Nomenclature and Etymology of the Squares and Streets of Ferrara and Expansions] (in Italian). Ferrara: 2G Editrice. ISBN 978-88-89248-21-8.
- Carlo Bassi (2012). Nuova guida di Ferrara. Vita e spazio nell'architettura di una città emblematica [New Guide to Ferrara. Life and Space in the Architecture of an Emblematic City] (in Italian). Ferrara: Italo Bovolenta editore (original, in 1981) 2G editrice (for 2012 anastatic reprint). ISBN 978-8889248140.
- Luciano Chiappini (2001). Gli estensi. Storia di mille anni [The Este. A Thousand-Year History] (in Italian). Ferrara: Corbo Editore. ISBN 9788882690298.
- Marco Folin (2015). Modelli internazionali e tradizioni signorili: mausolei estensi tra Tardo Medioevo e prima età Moderna [International Models and Seigneurial Traditions: Estense Mausoleums between the Late Middle Ages and Early Modern Era] (in Italian). Brepols. ISBN 978-2-503-55534-8. OCLC 952700760. (contained in: Il principe invisibile; atti del convegno internazionale di studi (Mantova 27-30 novembre 2013) [The Invisible Prince; Proceedings of the International Study Conference (Mantua, 27-30 November 2013)] (in Italian). Turnhout: Brepols. 2015. ISBN 978-2-503-55534-8. OCLC 953777034.)
- Marco Folin (2009). Le residenze di corte e il sistema delle delizie fra medioevo ed età moderna [Court Residences and the System of Delizie between the Middle Ages and the Modern Era] (PDF) (in Italian). Distributed in digital format by “Reti Medievali”. ISBN 9788822259370. OCLC 886993915.
- Marina Cogotti and Francesco Paolo Fiore, ed. (2013). Ippolito II d'Este cardinale principe mecenate: atti del convegno [Ippolito II d'Este, Cardinal, Prince, Patron: Conference Proceedings] (pdf) (in Italian). Rome: De Luca. ISBN 9788865571248. OCLC 897958151.

== See also ==
- Studiolo di Belfiore
- House of Este
- Duchy of Ferrara
