= Michele Pannonio =

Hungarian-Italian painter

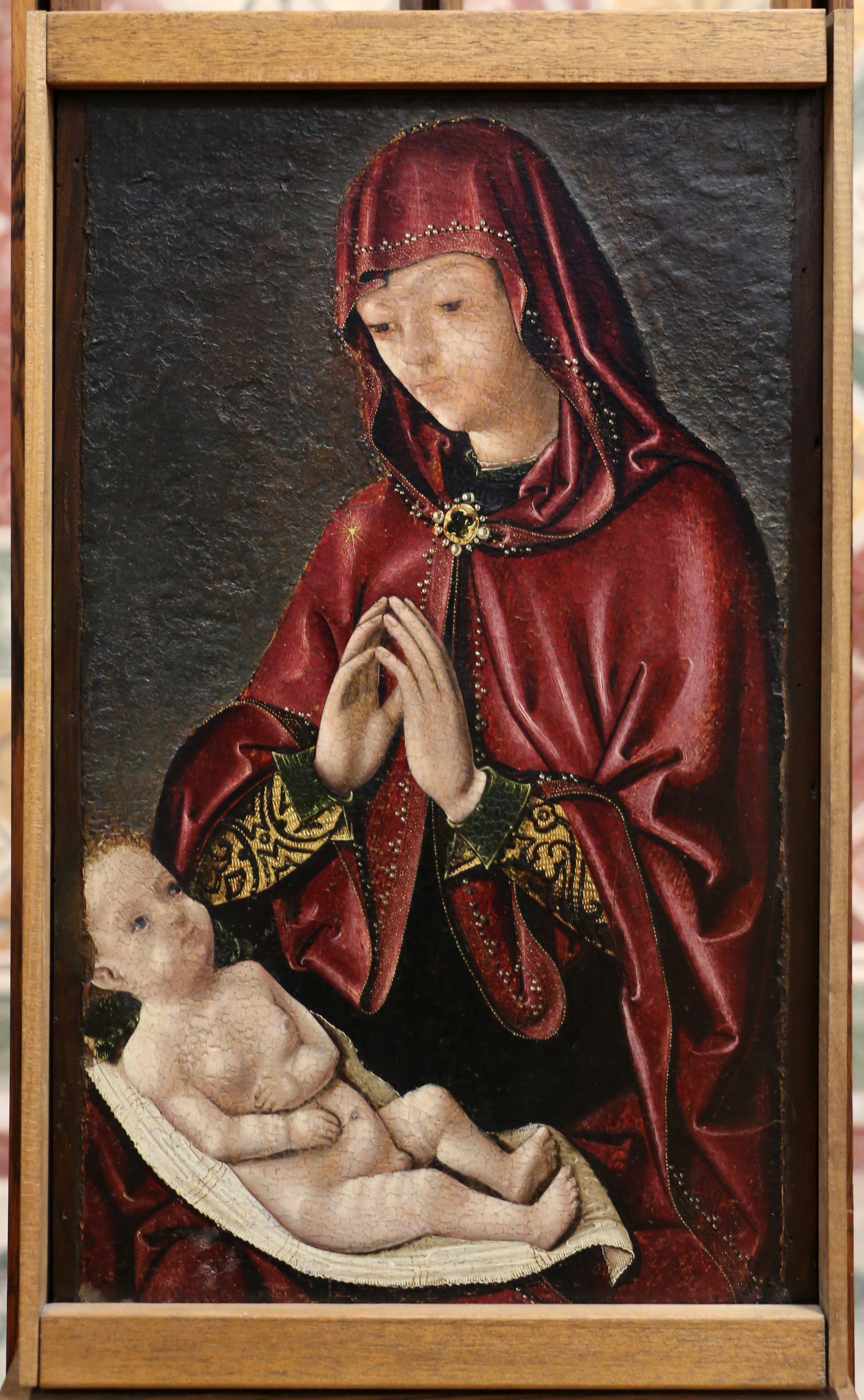
Madonna and Child

Michele Pannonio, in Hungarian language Pannóniai Mihály, also known as Michele Ongaro or Michele Dai Ungheria (born before 1415 – Ferrara, before 1464) was a Hungarian-Italian painter, active in Ferrara, Italy.

== Biography ==
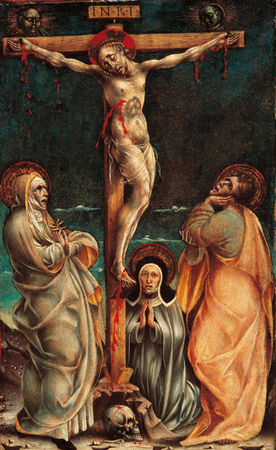
Crucifixion, circa 1450-55

He is documented as the painter of The Muse Thalia for the Studiolo di Belfiore, now present in the Museum of Fine Arts of Budapest. The Pinacoteca Nazionale di Ferrara has two works by Pannonio, a San Ludovico da Tolosa and a San Bernardino da Siena. Both were formerly in the chiesa di Spirito Santo of Ferrara.
