= Angelo Maccagnino =

Italian painter

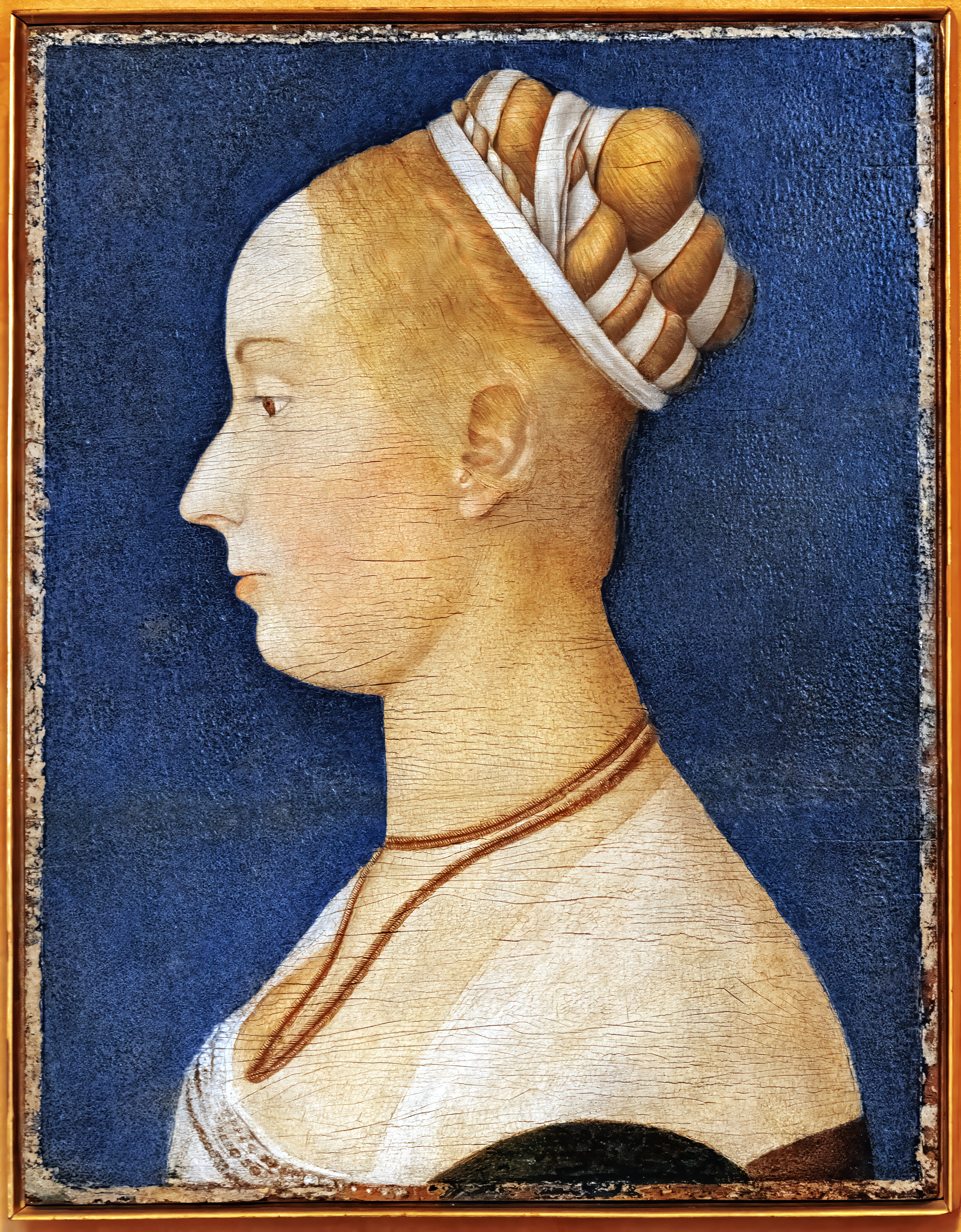
Portrait of a woman

Angelo Maccagnino, also known as Angelo da Siena (active 1447 – 1456), was an Italian Renaissance painter.

He was from Siena but became a pupil of Rogier van der Weyden and from 1447 court painter to Leonello d'Este, Marquis of Ferrara. Working alongside Cosme Tura, he contributed to the paintings of Muses for the Studiolo of the Palazzo Belfiore, Ferrara.
