= Brutus, Lucretia and Collatinus =

Painting attributed to Giovan Francesco Maineri

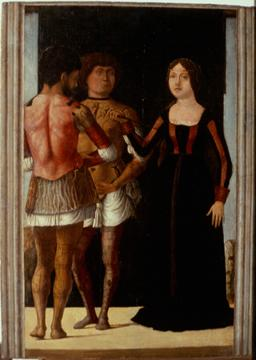
- Artist: Giovan Francesco Maineri, after Ercole de' Roberti
- Year: c. 1490–1493
- Medium: Tempera on panel
- Dimensions: 47 cm × 30 cm (19 in × 12 in)
- Location: Galleria Estense, Modena

Brutus, Lucretia and Collatinus is a painting of c. 1490–1493 in tempera on panel, attributed to Giovan Francesco Maineri but from preparatory drawings by Ercole de' Roberti. It is in the Galleria Estense in Modena.

This panel, The Wife of Hasdrubal and Her Children and Brutus and Portia were originally part of a series of works depicting famous women of antiquity, probably commissioned by Ercole I d'Este's wife Eleanor of Aragon and referring back to the motto of her father, Ferdinand I of Naples: "Preferisco la morte al disonore" ('I prefer death to dishonour').
