= Brutus and Portia =

Painting by Ercole de' Roberti

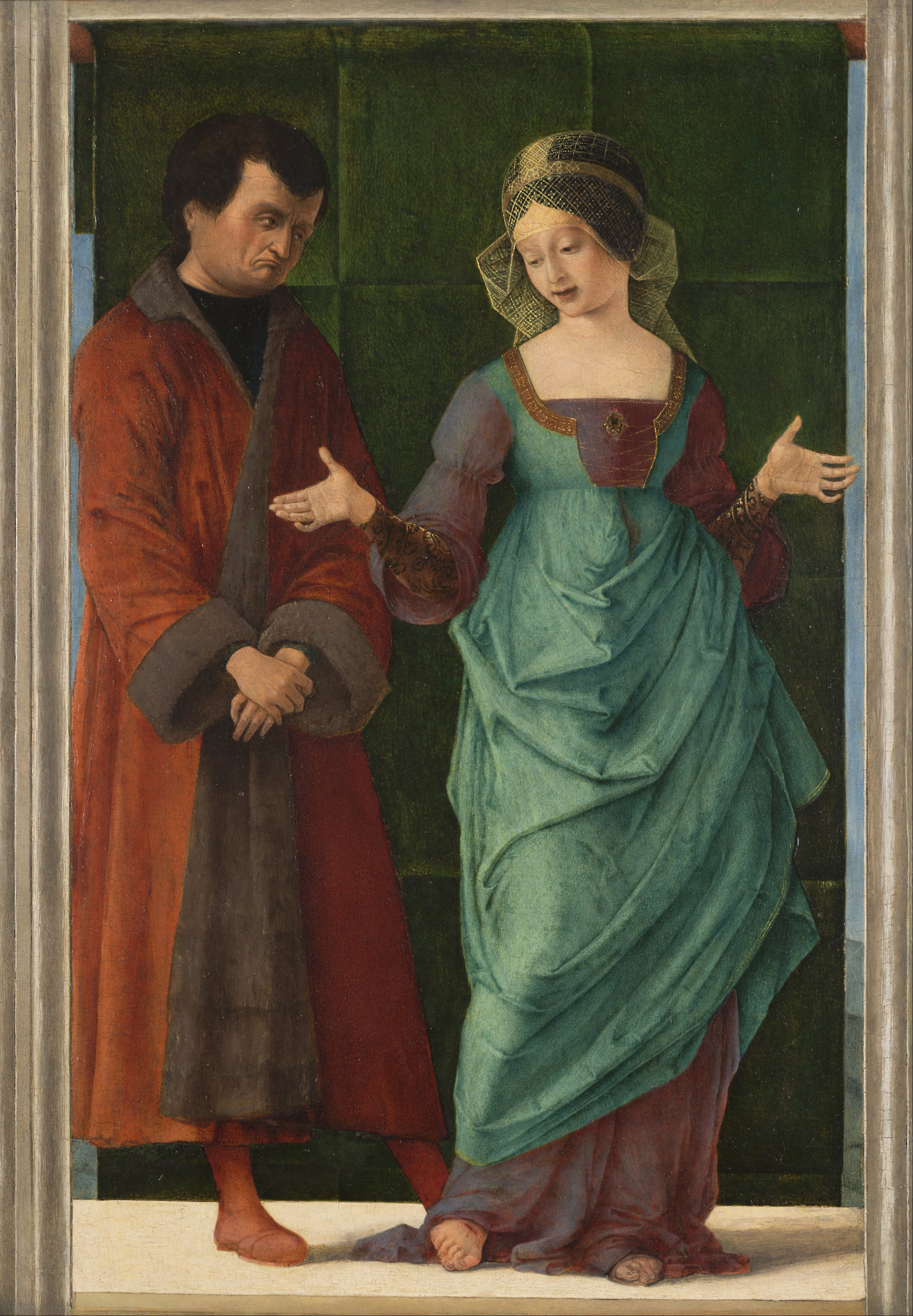
- Artist: Ercole de' Roberti
- Year: c. 1486–1490
- Medium: Tempera, possibly oil, and gold on panel
- Dimensions: 48.7 cm × 34.3 cm (19.2 in × 13.5 in)
- Location: Kimbell Art Museum; Fort Worth

Brutus and Portia is a painting in tempera on panel of c. 1486–1490 by Ercole de' Roberti in the Kimbell Art Museum in Fort Worth, Texas, which acquired it in 1986. It shows Caesar's assassin Marcus Junius Brutus and his wife Porcia.

This panel, Brutus, Lucretia and Collatinus and The Wife of Hasdrubal and Her Children were originally part of a series of works depicting famous women of antiquity, probably commissioned by Ercole I d'Este's wife Eleanor of Aragon and referring back to the motto of her father, Ferdinand I of Naples: "Preferisco la morte al disonore" ('I prefer death to dishonor').

== About the painting ==
The painting is based on a book. There are a few different books about this topic, each differing from each other in a minor way. The book that the painting is based on is unknown, but each book in the series keeps a similar theme. The characters in this painting are demonstrating themselves in an unusual way. Porta is opening her arms to the audience. This portrayal of the two characters shows us that they are in some kind of bad situation. The main focus of this painting is Portia. In this painting there are details that connect this work to some of his other pieces of work by Ercole de' Roberti. These minor details are what make a connection to the order at which his works were intended to be placed. Portia, on the other hand, was shown to be more of a traditional girl in the painting.

== Who is Portia ==
Portia is the wife to a man named Brutus. She gave birth to two children. Several studies suggest that her character was changed based on what the common belief was of women in this time period. Despite this, her character had aspects that were not common for women to have during this time period.

Portia is also known for trying to get information that her husband, Brutus, possessed. She tried to use her ability of charm to receive the information previously stated. There is much debate weather Portia had a good ability to charm or not. The article says that some people say she had this ability and that others say she did not. The attempt, to receive information, added depth to her character which, according to the article, people would have come to expect of her.

She ended up being a secrete holder for her husband, Brutus. Brutus decided to trust her with this secrete due to the fact that she was willing to injure herself for him. The intention of Portia's self-injury has been debated before and there is no clear answer. Despite this, she was known to have and show high moral standards in all the area of Rome. Even so much so, that this devotion showed up in her relationship to her husband, Brutus.

== The death of Portia ==
Portia died when she committed suicide. She did so due to the emotions she had concerning Brutus's death.
