= The Wife of Hasdrubal and Her Children =

Painting by Ercole de' Roberti

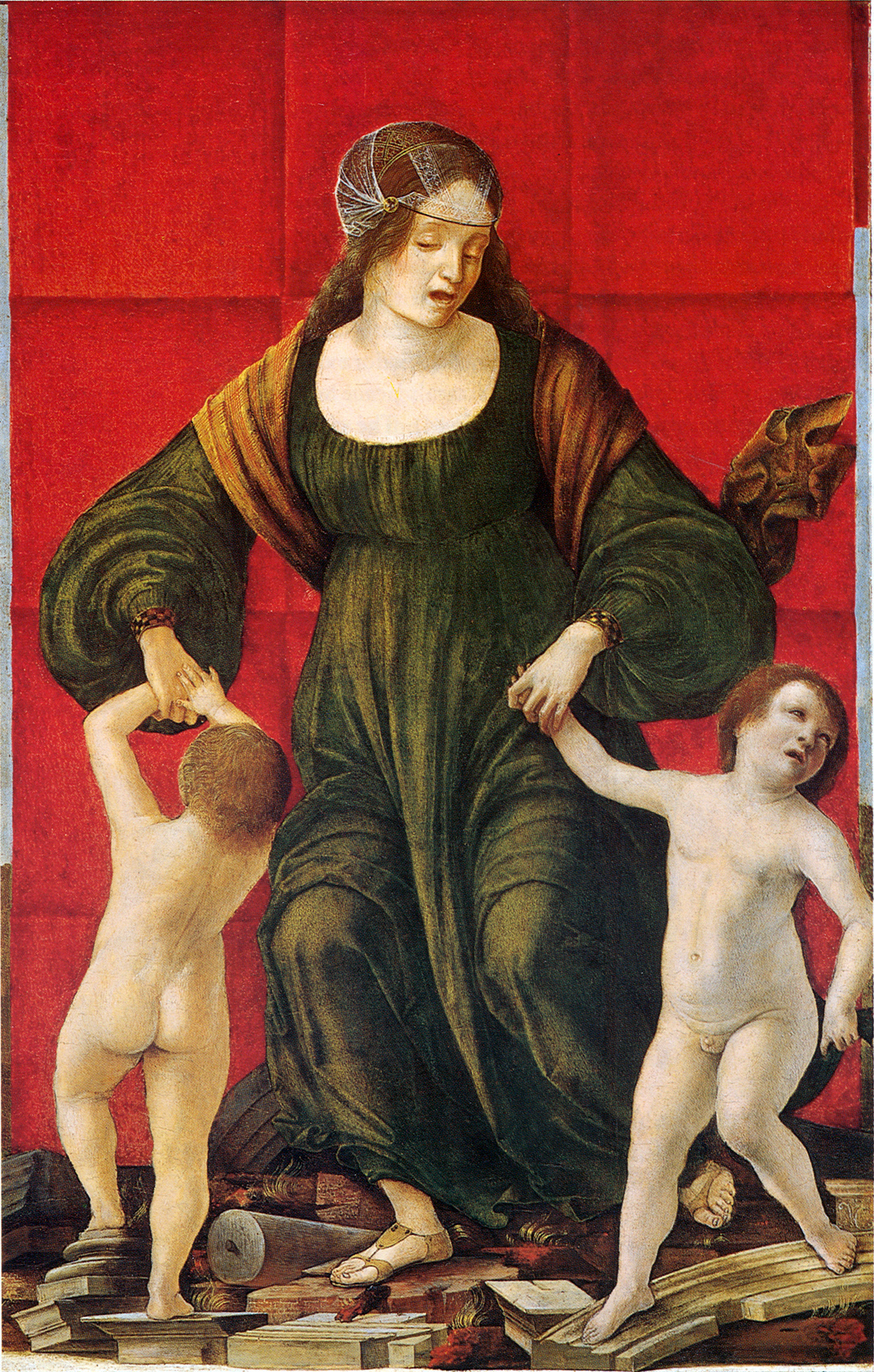
- Artist: Ercole de' Roberti
- Year: c. 1490–1493
- Medium: Tempera on poplar panel
- Dimensions: 47.3 cm × 30.6 cm (18.6 in × 12.0 in)
- Location: National Gallery of Art; Washington, D.C.

The Wife of Hasdrubal and Her Children is a painting of c. 1490–1493 in tempera on panel by Ercole de' Roberti in the National Gallery of Art in Washington, D.C., which acquired it in 1965.

This panel, Brutus, Lucretia and Collatinus and Brutus and Portia were originally part of a series of works depicting famous women of antiquity, probably commissioned by Ercole I d'Este's wife Eleanor of Aragon and referring back to the motto of her father, Ferdinand I of Naples: "Preferisco la morte al disonore" ('I prefer death to dishonor').

The painting shows the wife of Hasdrubal the Boetharch, the Carthaginian commander. Valerius Maximus's Acts and Memorable Deeds of the Ancient Romans states that Hasdrubal headed around 50,000 men who surrendered to Scipio Aemilianus during the Siege of Carthage, in punishment for which she sacrificed their sons in a burning temple before throwing herself into the flames.
