= Carlo Bassi =

Italian entomologist

Carlo Bassi (1807, in Amsterdam – 1856, in Milan) was an Italian entomologist.

He was honorary curator of entomology in the Museo Civico di Storia Naturale di Milan from 1841 to his death in 1856. He was a specialist in Coleoptera.

Bassi wrote "Description du genre Malacogaster" in Guérin-Méneville's Magasin de Zoologie, d'Anatomie com- parée et de Paleontologie 1833 and in the 1834 issue of Annales de la Société Entomologique de France, he erected the carabid genus Cardiomera.

His collection and extensive library of works on Coleoptera are conserved in the Museo Civico di Storia Naturale di Milan.
