= Santa Maria in Porto Altarpiece =

Painting by Ercole de' Roberti

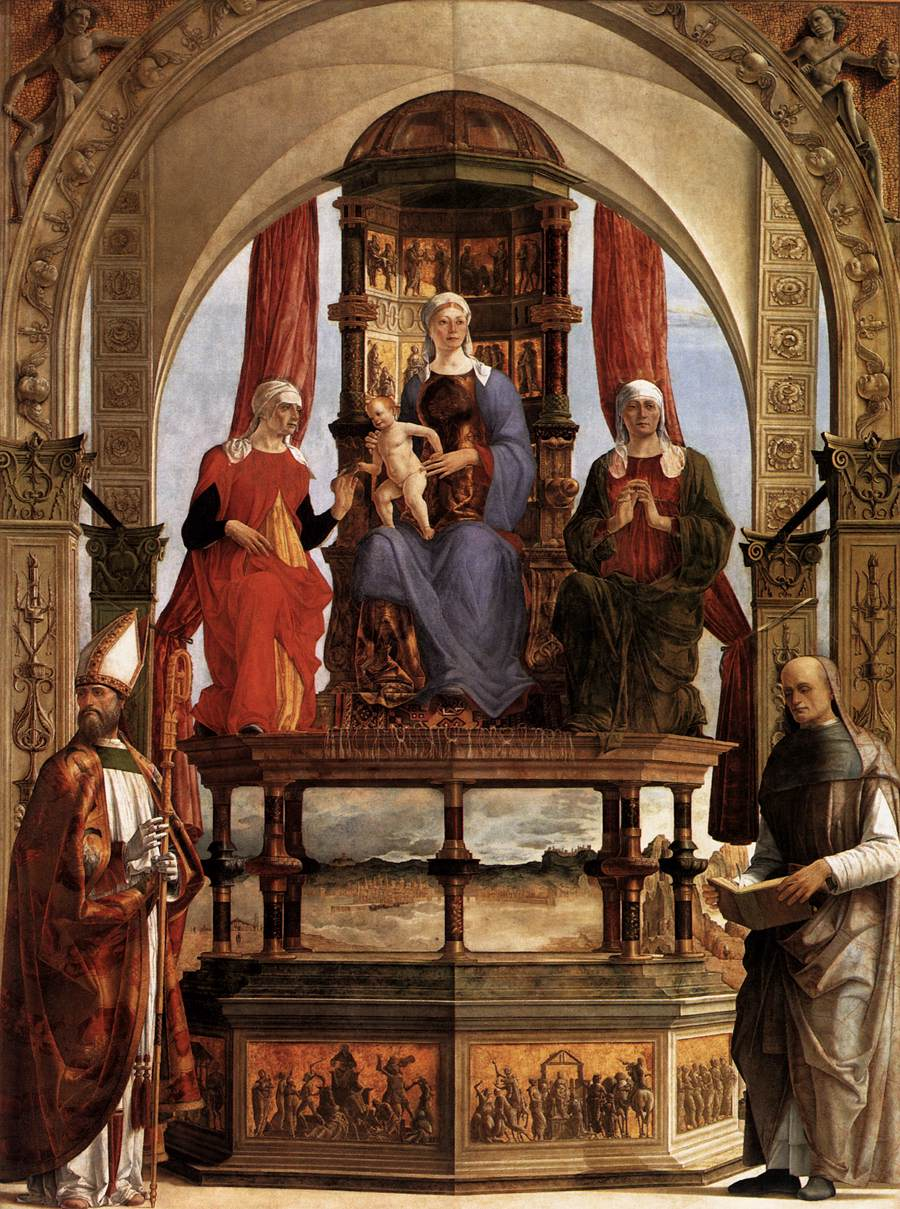
- Artist: Ercole de' Roberti
- Year: 1479–1481
- Medium: Oil on canvas
- Dimensions: 323 cm × 240 cm (127 in × 94 in)
- Location: Pinacoteca di Brera; Milan

The Santa Maria in Porto Altarpiece is a painting by the Italian Renaissance painter Ercole de' Roberti, executed in 1479-1481 and housed in the Pinacoteca di Brera, Milan, northern Italy.

It was executed for the church of Santa Maria in Porto, just outside Ravenna. In the 16th century it was moved to the church St. Francis in the same city but, after the Napoleonic invasion of Italy, it was then moved to Milan, being housed at Brera since 1811.

== Description ==
The painting features a mainly vertical architectural setting, under which a high octagonal podium with the Virgin's throne. The base is decorated by tiles (with the Massacre of the Innocents, Adoration of the Magi and the Presentation in the Temple) which simulated antique bas-reliefs and were inspired by the altar of the Basilica of Saint Anthony of Padua by Donatello.

The base supports columns with mouldings and decorations of garlands, dishes and marble rings, while in the background is a stormy sea. The latter is a reference to the legendary foundation of Santa Maria in Porto, when the Crusader Pietro degli Onesti, after escaping a shipwreck, made a vow to entitle a church to the Virgin Mary in exchange for his miraculous salvation.

The throne is enclosed in a niche with reliefs, and stands on a carpet. At the sides are red curtains. The four saints are St. Augustine (below left), the blessed Pietro degli Onesti (below right), St. Elizabeth and St. Anne (above, at the sides of the Virgin).

The whole composition is an example of the pyramidal structure introduced by Antonello da Messina in the Holy Conversation scheme after 1475.

== Sources ==
- Brera, guida alla Pinacoteca. Milan: Electa, publisher. 2004.
