= The Muse Thalia =

Painting by Michele Pannonio

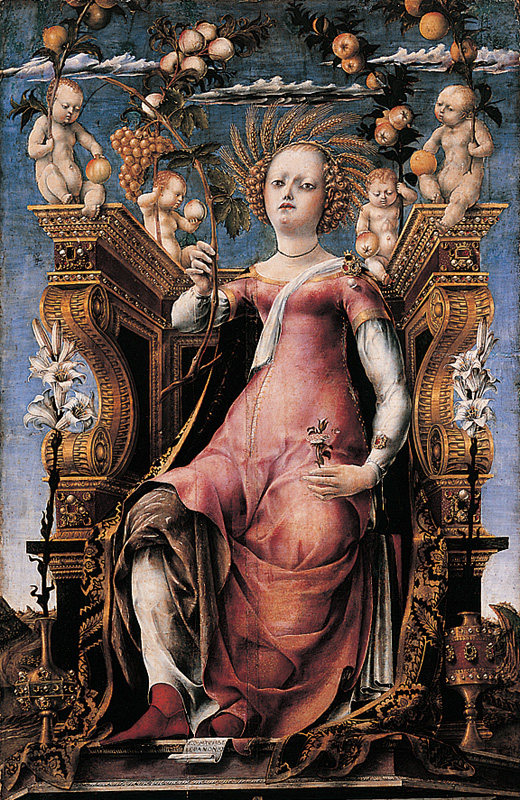

Thalia is a c.1546 painting by Michele Pannonio, signed by the artist and produced for the 'studiolo' in Belfiore, begun by Lionello d'Este in 1447 and completed by his brother Borso in 1463. After the palace's destruction by fire in 1632, its paintings were dispersed, with Thalia now being in the Museum of Fine Arts in Budapest.

Long misidentified as Ceres, the work is one of the few known works by the artist, active in Ferrara but of Hungarian origins.

== Sources ==
- The Muse Thalia - Michele Pannonio
