= Ercole de' Roberti =

15th-century Italian painter

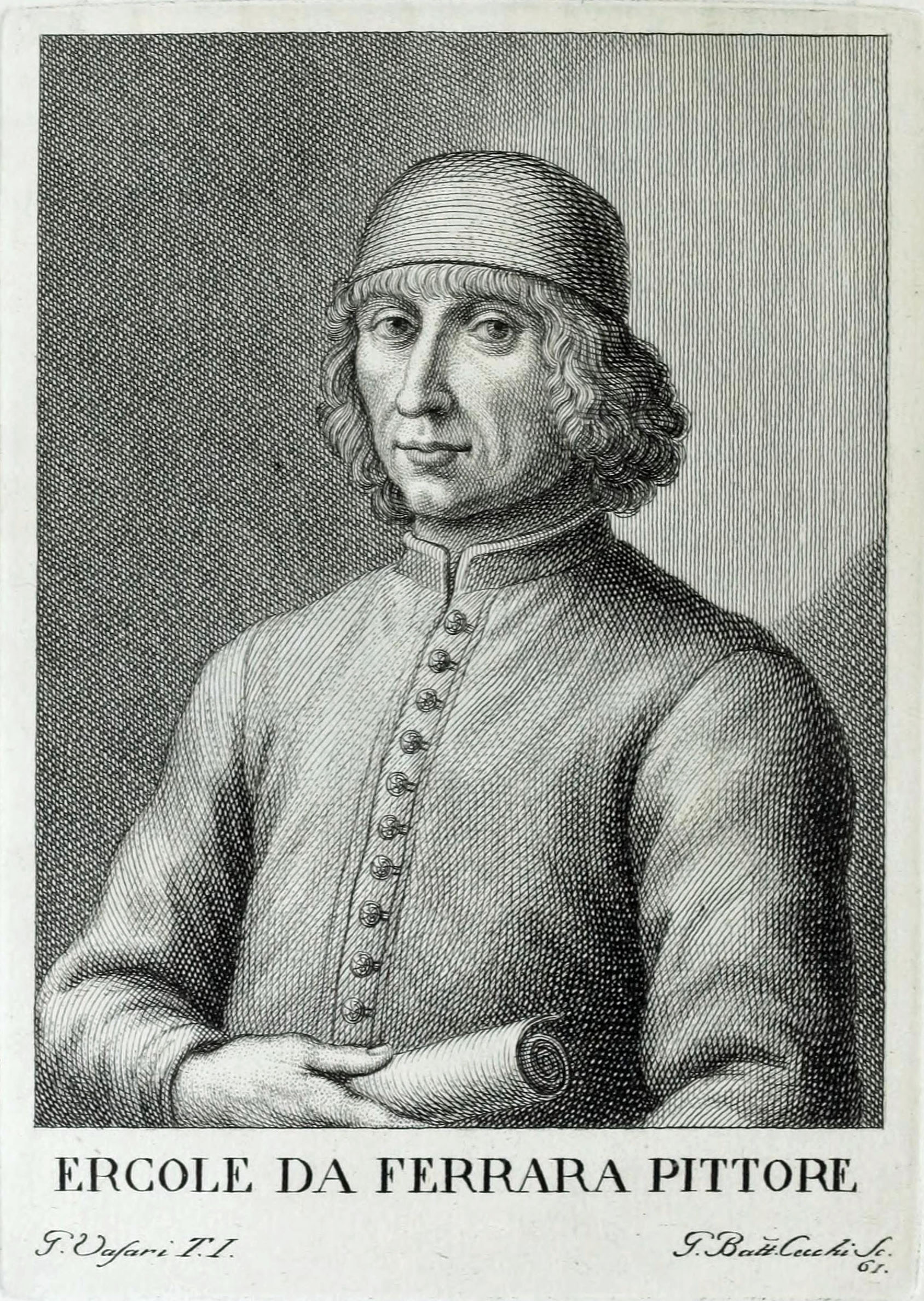
Ercole de' Roberti

Portrait of Giovanni II Bentivoglio (c. 1480). National Gallery of Art, Washington, D.C.

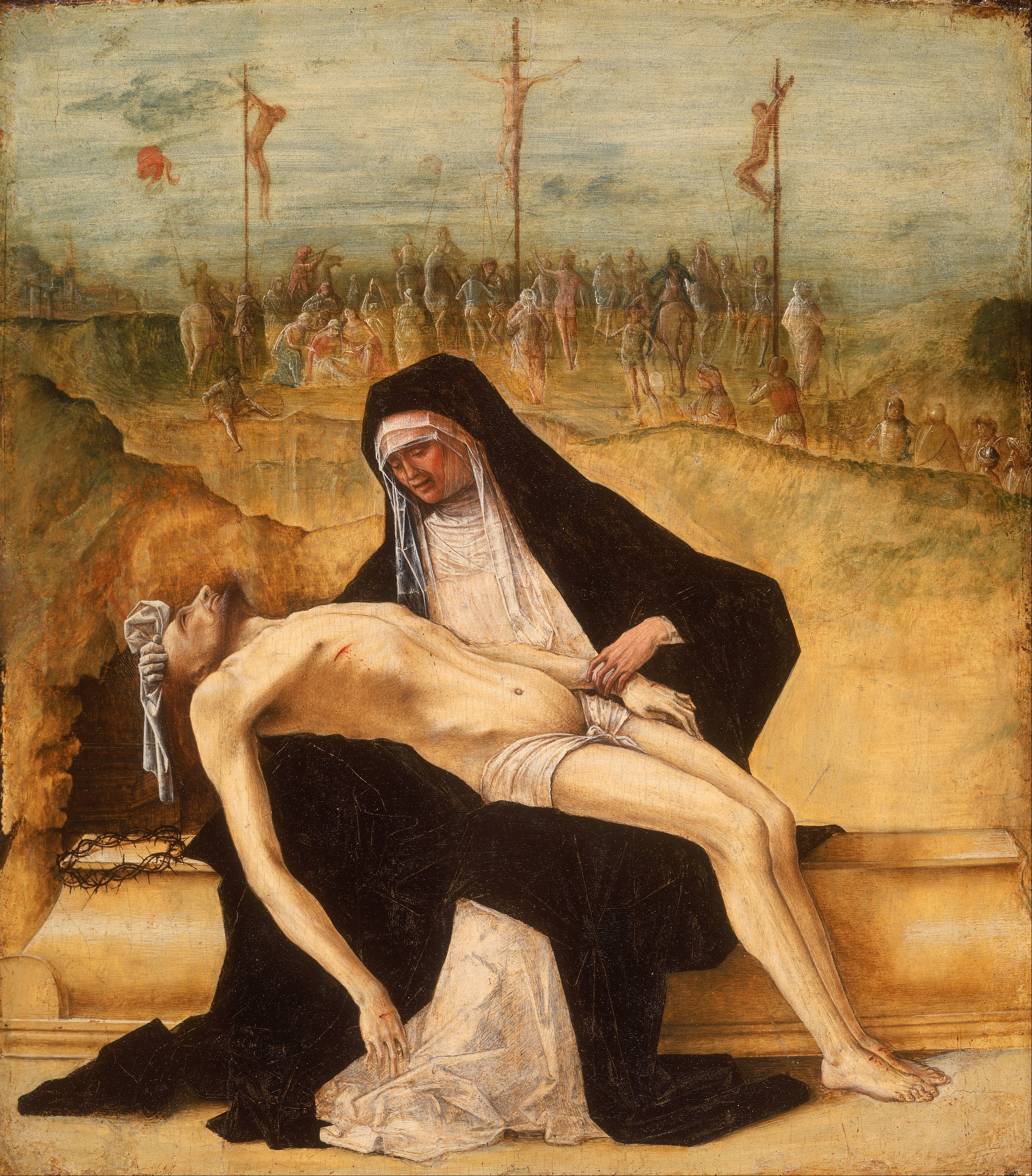
Pietà (c. 1495). Walker Art Gallery, Liverpool, UK.

Ercole de' Roberti (c. 1451 – 1496), also known as Ercole Ferrarese or Ercole da Ferrara, was an Italian artist of the Early Renaissance and the School of Ferrara. He was profiled in Vasari's Le Vite delle più eccellenti pittori, scultori, ed architettori. The son of the doorkeeper at the Este castle, Ercole later held the position of court artist for the Este family in Ferrara. According to Vasari:

Ercole had an extraordinary love of wine, and his frequent drunkenness did much to shorten his life, which he had enjoyed without any accident up to the age of forty, when he was smitten one day by apoplexy, which made an end of him in a short time.

Paintings by Ercole are rare. His life was short and many of his works have been destroyed.

== Works ==
By 1473, Ercole had left Ferrara and was working in Bologna in the studio of Francesco del Cossa. According to Vasari, Ercole also apprenticed under Lorenzo Costa in Bologna, but this seems unlikely as he was Lorenzo's senior by several years. Vasari was likely confusing him with Ercole da Bologna or Ercole Banci. Ercole's first mature works are his contributions to the Griffoni Chapel for the San Petronio Basilica in Bologna: a predella depicting the Miracles of St Vincent Ferrer (c. 1473) (now in the Pinacoteca of the Vatican), and lateral pilasters for the altarpiece commissioned from del Cossa.

Ercole de' Roberti is known to have collaborated in the frescoes of Palazzo Schifanoia. In 1480, Ercole created a large altarpiece with a Madonna and Child Enthroned with Saints for Santa Maria in Porto in Ravenna, which is now in the Pinacoteca di Brera, Milan. Portraits of Giovanni II Bentivoglio and Ginevra Bentivoglio attributed to Ercole de' Roberti (c. 1480) are in the National Gallery of Art, Washington, D.C.

Ercole succeeded Cosmè Tura as court painter to the Este family in Ferrara around 1486. His role apparently went far beyond making art: he accompanied Alfonso d'Este on a papal visit to Rome, served as wardrobe manager for Isabella d'Este's wedding in Mantua, and may even have made salamis.

A painting of Portia and Brutus (c. 1486–90), believed to be painted for Eleonora of Aragon, duchess of Ferrara, is in the Kimbell Art Museum, Fort Worth, Texas and is thought to belong to a series which also includes The Wife of Hasdrubal and Her Children and Brutus, Lucretia and Collatinus. Ercole's painting of Saint Jerome in the Wilderness from this period is in the collection of the J. Paul Getty Museum, Los Angeles. The Getty presented the first monographic exhibition of Ercole's work in 1999. At The Thyssen-Bornemisza Museum in Madrid there is a small panel from a cassone or wedding chest attributed to him. From around 1480 it narrates an episode of Ovid's famous Metamorphoses, The argonauts leaving Colchis.
