= Studiolo of the Palazzo Belfiore =

Palace study in Ferrara, Italy

The Studiolo of the Palazzo Belfiore was a former study, or room for intellectual pursuits, that was once found in a razed Renaissance palace in Ferrara, region of Emilia-Romagna, Italy. While the palace has disappeared, records do list the paintings, consisting of depictions of muses, that hung in the room. These secular works are now dispersed across museums, but their collective presences recall the renewed attention of Renaissance patrons to symbols from classic mythology.

The palace, like the Palazzo Schifanoia, is described now a delizia of the Este dynasty, which are now considered semi-rural palaces for the enjoyment of delights. The palace was commissioned in 1447 by Leonello d'Este but completed by Borso d'Este around 1463. The exact layout of the palace, located near the church of Santa Maria degli Angeli is unknown, since in 1483, it was severely damaged by the besieging Venetian armies, and a fire in 1683 completed the destruction.

Domenico da Piacenza is reputed to have taught in the Palazzo and choreographed the three-person ballo named Belfiore in its honor.

== Description ==
Leonello had commissioned the Studiolo dedicated to the Muses.

The decorative layout of the room was conceived by Guarino Veronese, a tutor of Lionello, In 1447, Guarino mailed Lionello a description of the allegorical figures. By 1449, the palace had the paintings of Clio and Melpomene. Decoration of the studio continued after the death of the tutor and pupil, and the program underwent modifications. The intarsia walls were destroyed along with the palace. Eight of the nine canvases are now attributed to this room:

1. Erato (love poetry); attributed to Angelo Maccagnino and follower of Cosmè Tura, Pinacoteca nazionale di Ferrara
2. Urania (astronomy); anonymous, Pinacoteca nazionale di Ferrara
3. Terpsichore (dance); Angelo Maccagnino and Cosmè Tura, Museo Poldi Pezzoli, Milan.
4. Thalia (comedy and pastoral poetry); Michele Pannonio, Museum of Fine Arts, Budapest
5. Euterpe (flutes and lyric poetry); anonymous Museum of Fine Arts, Budapest
6. Melpomene (tragedy); anonymous, Museum of Fine Arts, Budapest
7. Polyhymnia (sacred poetry); anonymous, Gemäldegalerie, Berlin
8. Calliope (epic poetry) Cosmè Tura, National Gallery, London

Supposedly the iconography parallels a bas-relief (1454-1456) depicted by Agostino di Duccio in the Tempio Malatestiano of Rimini.

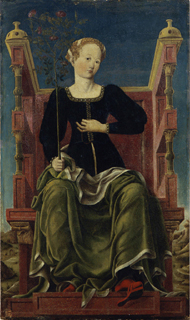
Erato

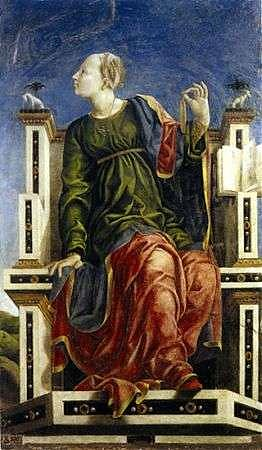
Urania

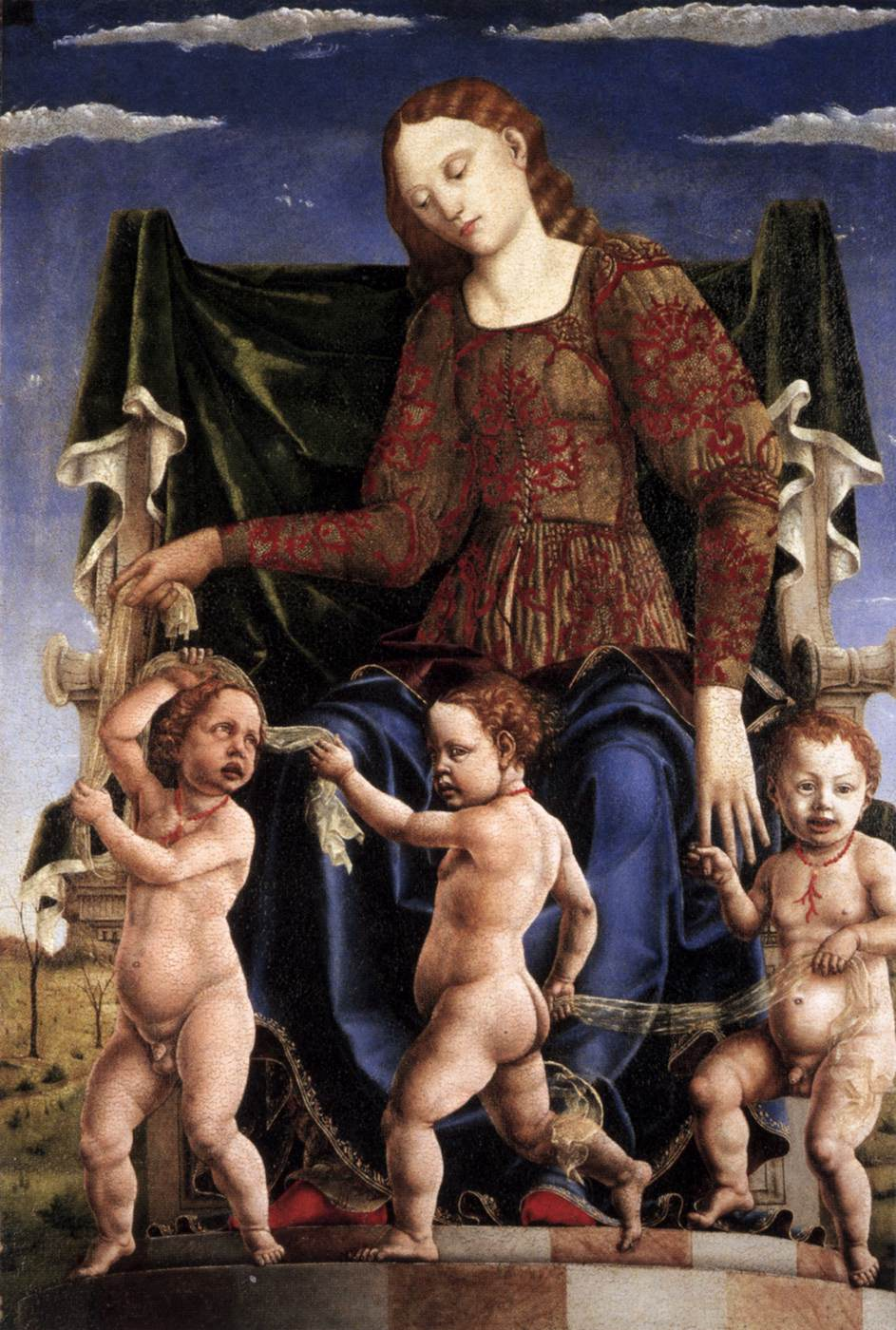
Terpsichore

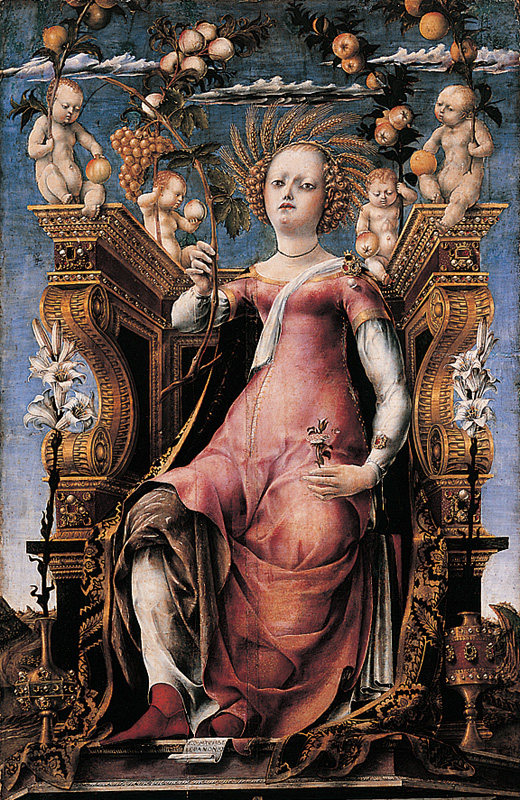
Thalia

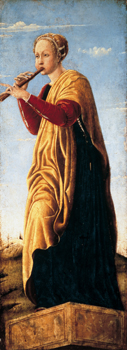
Euterpe

Melpomene

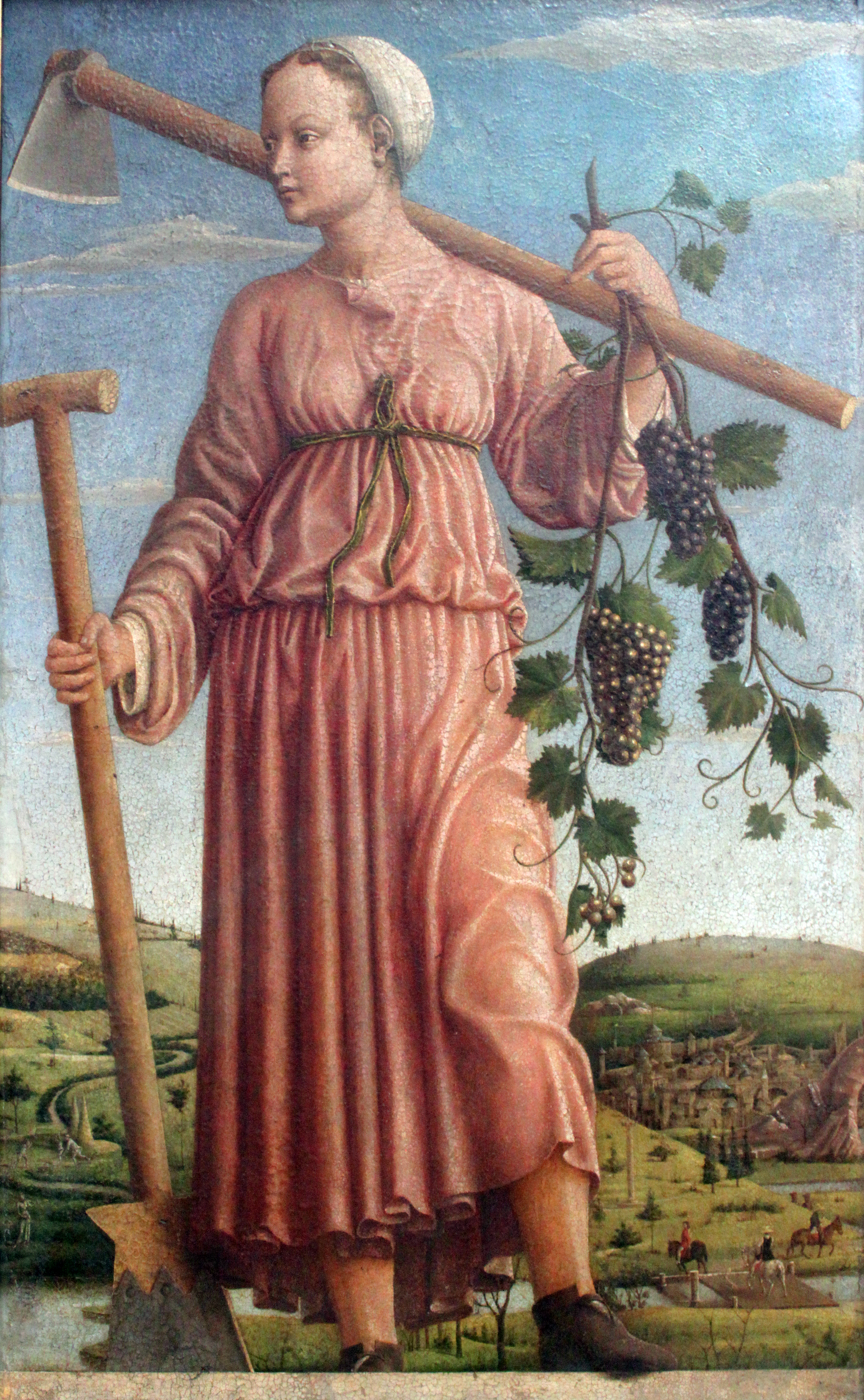
Polyhymnia

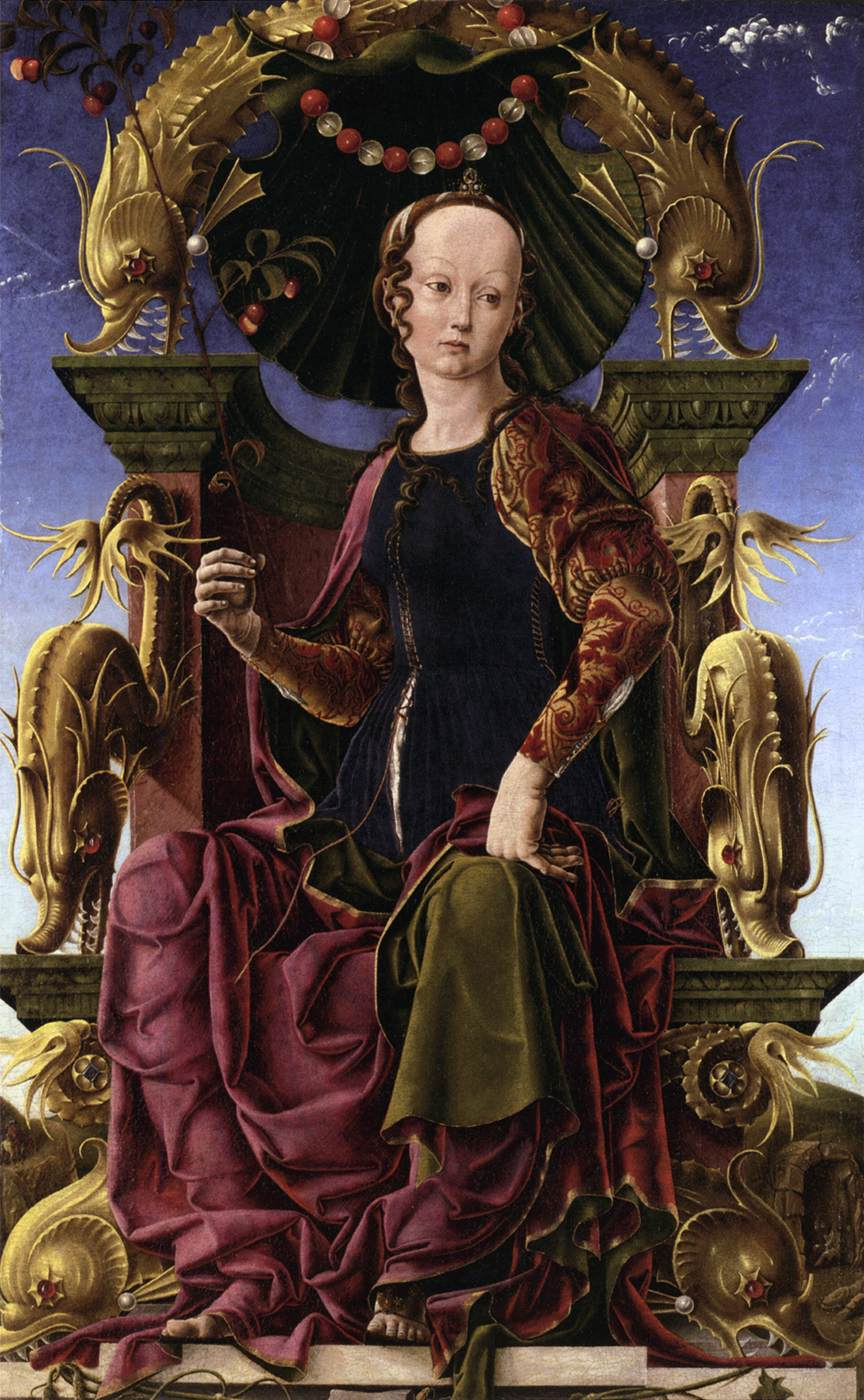
Calliope
