= Public space =

Places generally open and accessible to everyone

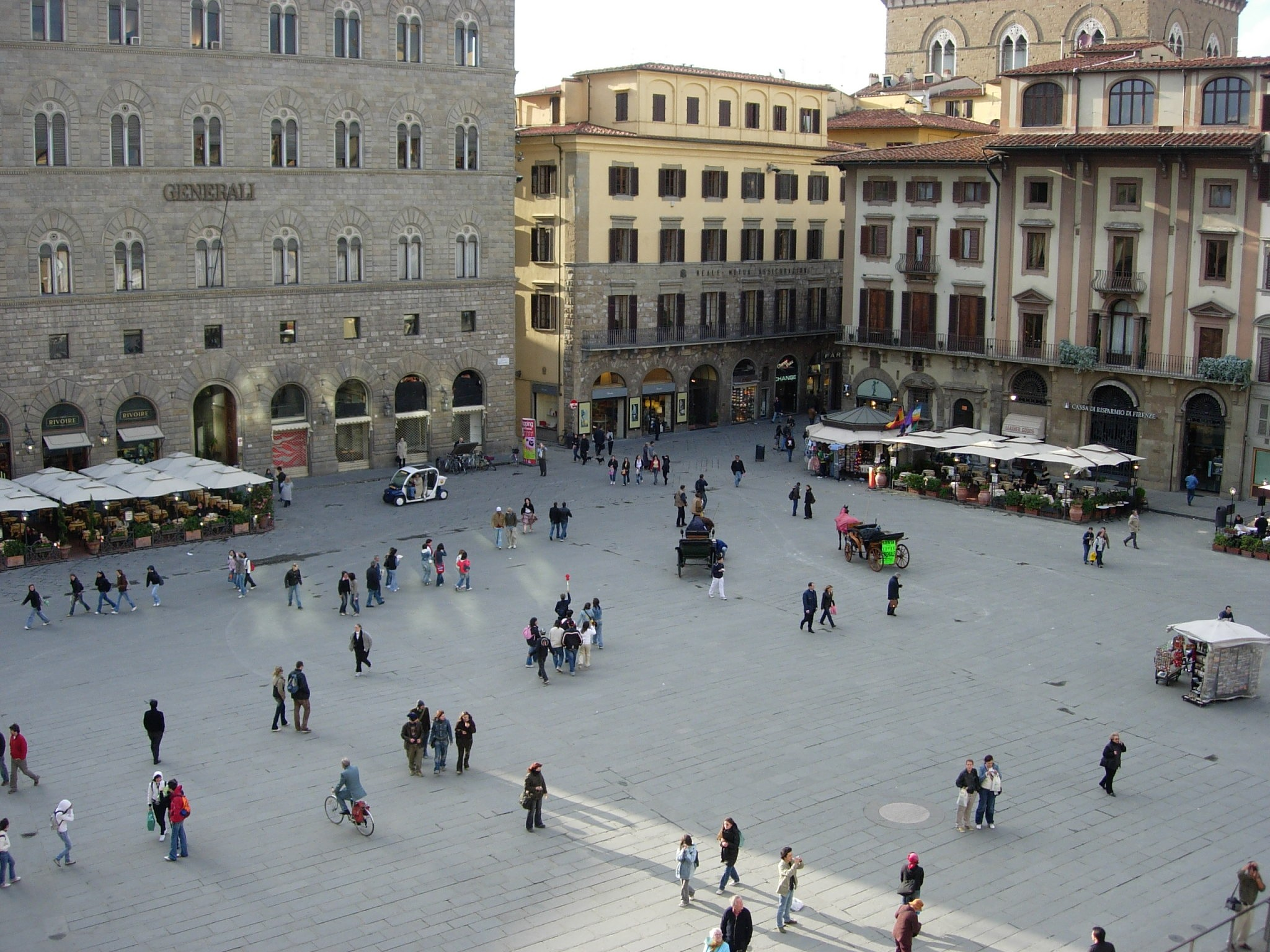
Urban space (Piazza della Signoria, Florence)

A public space is a place that is open and accessible to the general public. Roads, pavements, public squares, parks, and beaches are typically considered public space. To a limited extent, government buildings which are open to the public, such as public libraries, are public spaces, although they tend to have restricted areas and greater limits upon use. Although not considered public space, privately owned buildings or property visible from sidewalks and public thoroughfares may affect the public visual landscape, for example, by outdoor advertising. Recently, the concept of shared space has been advanced to enhance the experience of pedestrians in public space jointly used by automobiles and other vehicles.

Public space has also become something of a touchstone for critical theory in relation to philosophy, urban geography, visual art, cultural studies, social studies and urban design. The term 'public space' is also often misconstrued to mean other things such as 'gathering place', which is an element of the larger concept of social space. Public spaces have often been valued as democratic spaces of congregation and political participation, where groups can vocalize their rights.

Commons are early examples of public space. Malls, regardless of private ownership percentage, are examples of 'public space' since no fees or paid tickets are required for entry. However, most indoor shopping malls and strip malls are private property and subject to the rights of the owners.

Filming in public spaces is legal, but shopping malls are privately owned properties and often require permission for photography and video.

== Use ==
=== Right to common passage ===
In Nordic countries, like Norway, Sweden, Finland, and also Estonia, all nature areas are considered public space, due to a law, the allemansrätten (the right to common passage).

=== Definition in the United Kingdom ===
In the United Kingdom a "Public place" includes any highway and any other premises or place to which at the material time the public have or are permitted to have access, whether on payment or otherwise.

=== Restrictions on state action in the United States ===
If Members of the public had no right whatsoever to distribute leaflets or engage in other expressive activity on government-owned property...then there would be little if any opportunity to exercise their rights of freedom of expression.

— Supreme Court of Canada, defending right to poster on public utility poles and hand out leaflets in public government-owned buildings

In the United States the right of the people to engage in speech and assembly in public places may not be unreasonably restricted by the federal or state government. The government cannot usually limit one's speech beyond what is reasonable in a public space, which is considered to be a public forum (that is, screaming epithets at passers-by can be stopped; proselytizing one's religion probably cannot). In a private—that is, non-public—forum, the government can control one's speech to a much greater degree; for instance, protesting one's objection to medicare reform will not be tolerated in the gallery of the United States Senate. This is not to say that the government can control what one says in their own home or to others; it can only control government property in this way. The concept of a public forum is not limited to physical space or public property; for example, a newspaper might be considered a public forum, but see forum in the legal sense as the term has a specific meaning in United States law.

Parks, malls, beaches, waiting rooms, etc., may be closed at night. As this does not exclude any specific group, it is generally not considered a restriction on public use. Entry to public parks cannot be restricted based upon a user's residence.

=== Social norms ===
In some cultures, there is no expectation of privacy in a public space; however civil inattention is a process whereby individuals are able to maintain their privacy within a crowd.

=== Restrictions on use ===
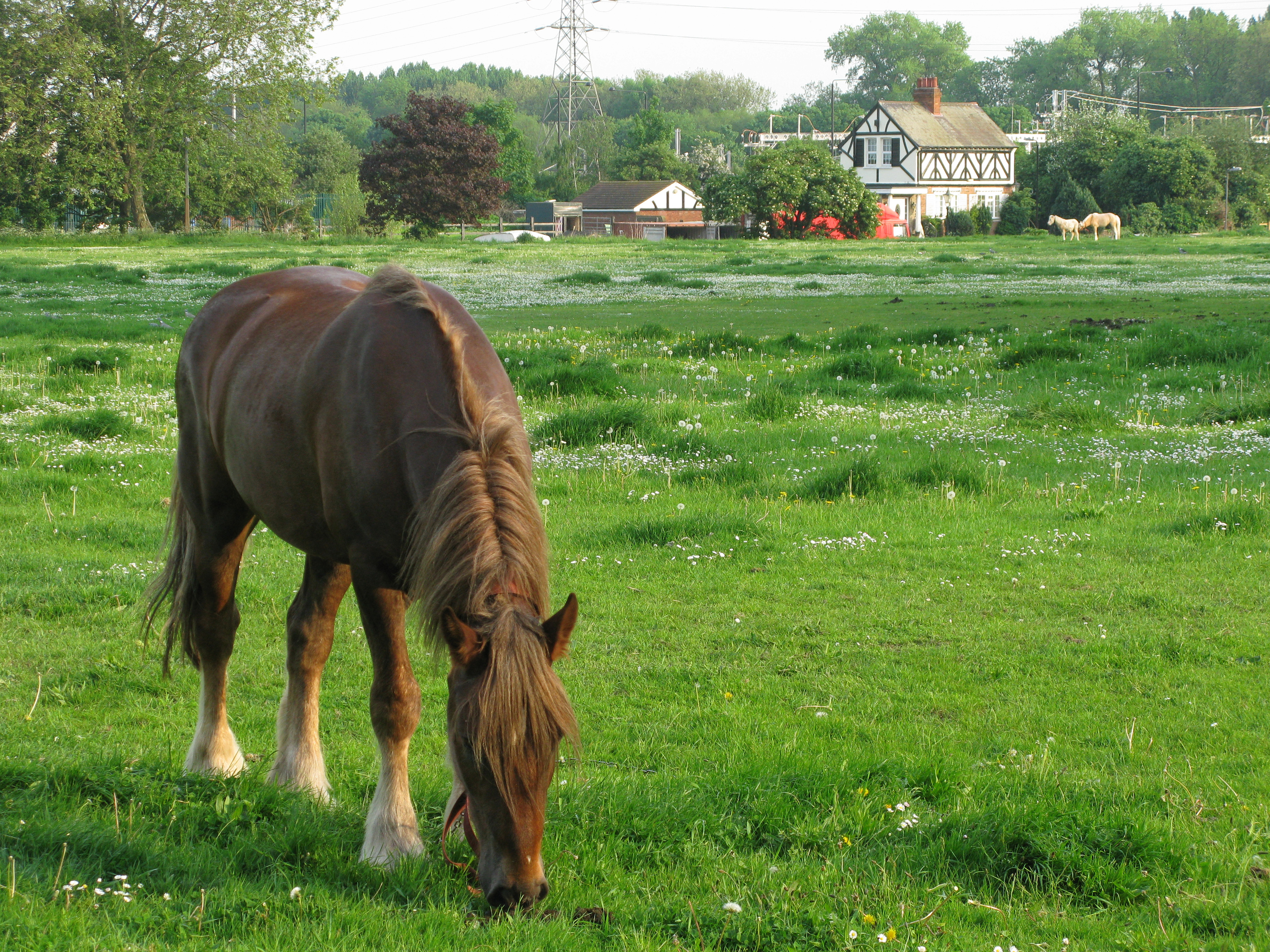
Leyton Marshes, London, an example of land with long-established rights of access, and equally long-standing restrictions

Public space is commonly shared and created for open usage throughout the community, whereas private space is owned by individuals or corporations. The area is built for a range of various types of recreation and entertainment. Limitations are imposed in the space to prevent certain actions from occurring—public behavior that is considered inappropriate (i.e., drug and alcohol consumption, public urination, indecent exposure, etc.)--and are supported by law or ordinance. Through the landscape and spatial organization of public space, the social construction is considered to be privately ruled by the implicit and explicit rules and expectations of the space that are enforced.

Whilst it is generally considered that everyone has a right to access and use public space, as opposed to private space which may have restrictions, there has been some academic interest in how public spaces are managed to exclude certain groups - specifically homeless people and young people.

Measures are taken to make the public space less attractive to them, including the removal or design of benches to restrict their use for sleeping and resting, restricting access to certain times, and locking indoor/enclosed areas. Police forces are sometimes involved in moving 'unwanted' members of the public from public spaces. In fact, by not being provided suitable access, disabled people are implicitly excluded from some spaces.

=== As a site for democracy ===
Human geographers have argued that in spite of the exclusions that are part of public space, it can nonetheless be conceived of as a site where democracy becomes possible. Geographer Don Mitchell has written extensively on the topic of public space and its relation to democracy, employing Henri Lefebvre's notion of the right to the city in articulating his argument. While democracy and public space do not entirely coincide, it is the potential of their intersection that becomes politically important. Other geographers like Gill Valentine have focused on performativity and visibility in public spaces, which brings a theatrical component or 'space of appearance' that is central to the functioning of a democratic space.

=== Privatization ===
A privately owned public space, also known as a privately owned public open space (POPOS), is a public space that is open to the public, but owned by a private entity, typically a commercial property developer. Conversion of publicly owned public spaces to privately owned public spaces is referred to as the privatization of public space, and is a common result of urban redevelopment.

Beginning roughly in the 1960s, the privatization of public space (especially in urban centers) has faced criticism from citizen groups such as the Open Spaces Society. Private-public partnerships have taken significant control of public parks and playgrounds through conservancy groups set up to manage what is considered unmanageable by public agencies. Corporate sponsorship of public leisure areas is ubiquitous, giving open space to the public in exchange for higher air rights. This facilitates the construction of taller buildings with private parks.

In one of the newer U.S. incarnations of the private-public partnership, the business improvement district (BID), private organizations are allowed to tax local businesses and retail establishments so that they might provide special private services such as policing and increased surveillance, trash removal, or street renovation, all of which once fell under the control of public funds.

Debates over the commercialization of space can also extend to collectively used residential areas. In 2025, Kong Junyou, a student at Shanghai University, shut down more than 100 advertising screens in residential elevators, prompting discussion over whether property managers and advertising companies should commercialize shared spaces without residents' consent.

=== Semi-public spaces ===
A broader meaning of public space or place also includes places where everybody can come if they pay, like a café, train, or movie theater. A shop is an example of what is intermediate between the two meanings: everybody can enter and look around without obligation to buy, but activities unrelated to the purpose of the shop are at the discretion of the proprietor.

The halls and streets (including skyways) in a shopping center may be declared a public place and may be open when the shops are closed. Similarly for halls, railway platforms and waiting rooms of public transport; sometimes a travelling ticket is required. A public library is a public place. A rest stop or truck stop is a public space.

For these "semi-public" spaces stricter rules may apply than outside, e.g. regarding dress code, trading, begging, advertising, photography, propaganda, riding rollerskates, skateboards, a Segway, etc.

== In design theory ==
Public space, as a term and as a concept in design, is volatile. There is much conversation around what constitutes public space, what role it plays, and how design should approach and deal with it.

=== Historical shift ===
Historically, public space in the West has been limited to town centres, plazas, church squares, i.e. nearly always engineered around a central monument, which informs the program of the space. These spaces acted as the 'commons' of the people; a political, social and cultural arena. Of the thirteen colonies that became the United States, three were comprehensively planned with integrated physical, social, and economic elements. These planned colonies of Carolina, Pennsylvania, and Georgia each placed emphasis on public space, in particular the public square. The plan for Georgia, known as the Oglethorpe Plan created a unique design in which a public square was created for every ward of forty residential lots and four civic or commercial lots. The design has been preserved in the Savannah historic district.

Jürgen Habermas' concept of the public sphere links its emergence with the development of democracy. A good example of this is the New Deal projects. The New Deal was a brief period in the US under Franklin Delano Roosevelt's government that produced a huge number of public works in an economic effort to boost employment during the depression. The result, however, was more than this. They constituted a legacy of what has been called the cultural infrastructure underlying American public space. The New Deal projects have been credited with significantly contributing to the quality of American life and encouraging unity between all aspects of the community. It has been recently argued, however, that the democratic ideal of public life through the use of public space has deteriorated. As our cities accelerate towards segregation (social, economic, cultural, ethnic), the opportunity for public interaction is on the decline. John Chase writes, "The importance of voluntary and obligatory participation in civic life has been usurped by the consciousness of the arbitrary nature of assigned cultural meanings and by the increasingly important role that consumption of goods and services plays in the formation of individual identity."

=== Modern critique ===
Modern architectural critics have lamented the 'narrative of loss' within the public sphere. That is, modern society has withdrawn from public life that used to inform city centres. Political and social needs, and forums for expression, can now be accessed from the home. This sentiment is reflected in Michael Sorkin's and Mike Davis' declaration of "the end of public space" and the "destruction of any truly democratic urban spaces." Another side of the debate, however, argues that it is people who apply meaning to public space, wherever it may be. It has been suggested that the concepts of public, space, democracy, and citizenship are being redefined by people through lived experience. Discussion has surfaced around the idea that, historically, public space has been inherently contradictory in the way that it has always been exclusive in who has been able to participate. This has caused the "counterpublics", as identified by Nancy Fraser, to establish their own public spaces to respond to their own concerns. These spaces are in constant flux, and in response, their users restructure and reinterpret physical space. An example of this is in the African-American neighbourhood, Baldwin Hills, Los Angeles. Here, a parking lot has evolved into a scene of intense commercial and social activity. Locals gather here to meet and socialise, sell and consume goods. The example has been used to illustrate that the historical ideal of fixed public space around a monument is not viable for a contemporary diverse social range as "no single physical space can represent a completely inclusive 'space of democracy'."

=== Art ===
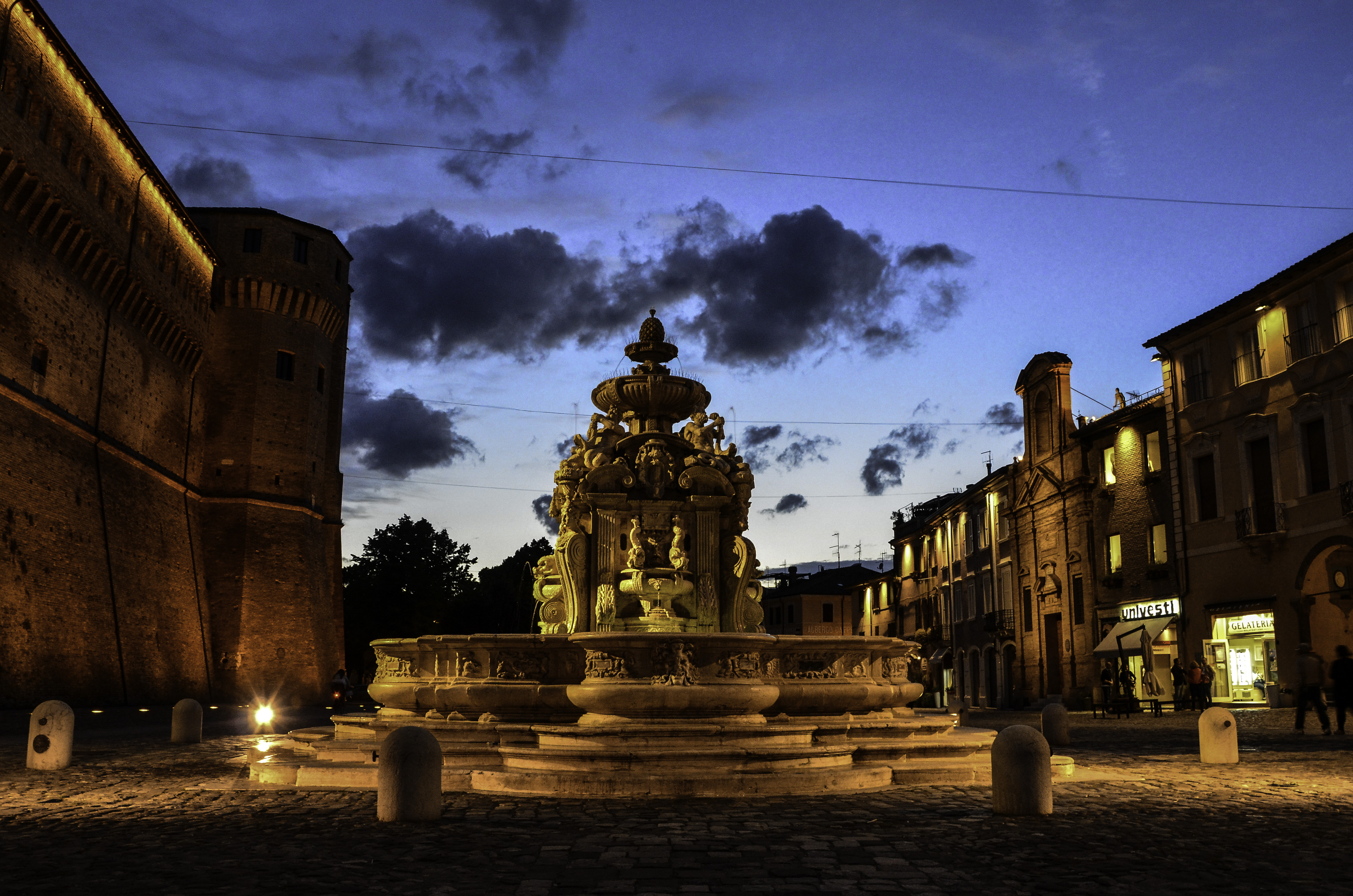
Piazza del Popolo in Cesena with the artistic Fontana Masini

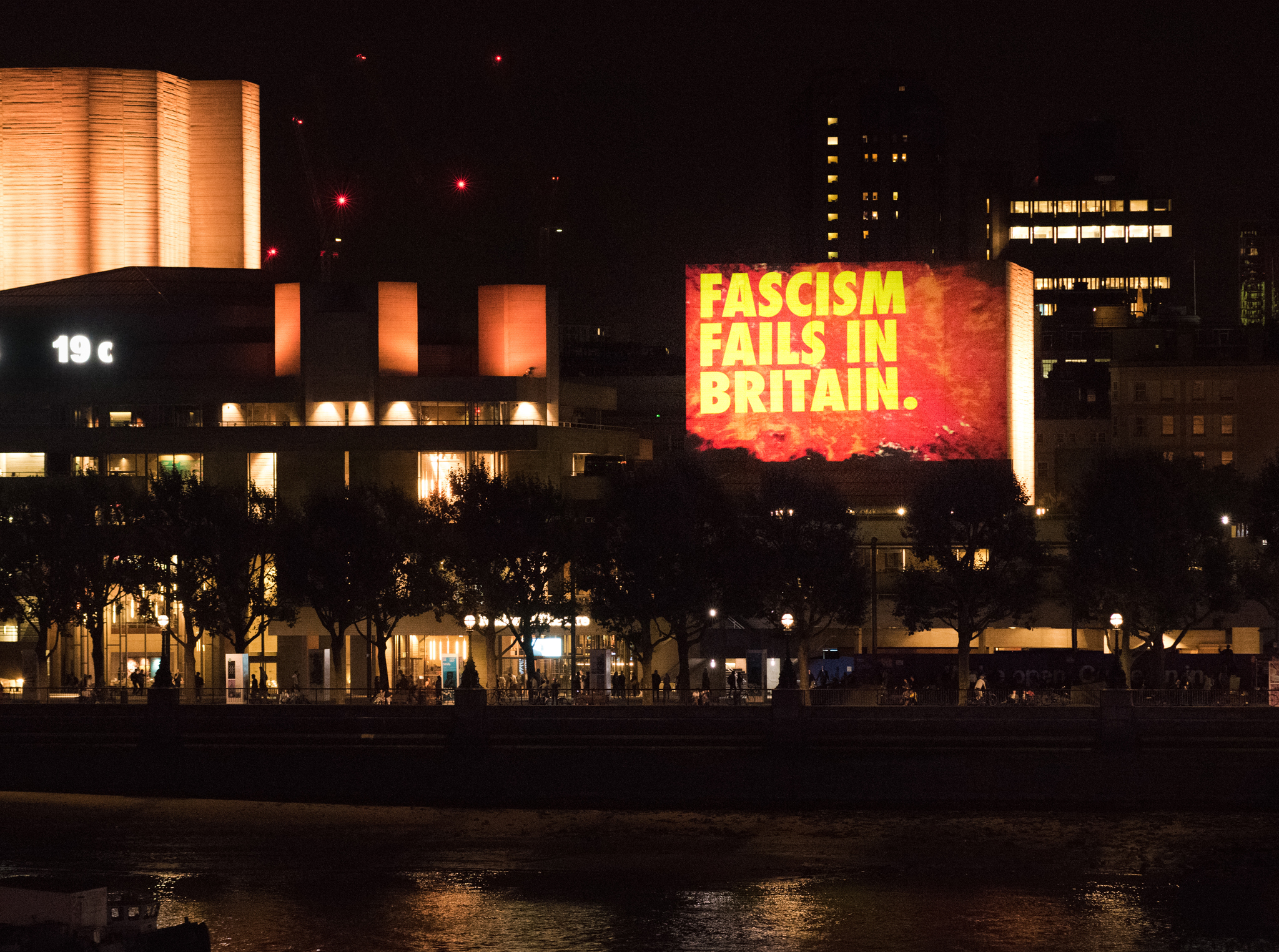
Martin Firrell The Royal National Theatre London 2016

This sense of flux and change informs how contemporary public art has evolved. Temporal art in public spaces has been a long-established practice, but the presence of public art has become increasingly prevalent within modern cities. Temporal public art is important because of its ability to respond to, reflect, and explore the context which it inhabits. Patricia Phillips describes the "social desire for an art that is contemporary and timely, that responds to and reflects its temporal and circumstantial context." Public art is often credited for investigation, exploration and articulation of the dense and diverse public landscape. Public art asks its audience to re-imagine, re-experience, re-view and re-live. In the design field, a heavy focus has been turned onto the city as needing to discover new and inspired ways to re-use, re-establish, and re-invent the city, in step with an invigorated interest in rejuvenating our cities for a sustainable future. In some cases, dance, music and other cultural events organised by the local community have also been crucial in the process of revitalisation of some decaying public spaces.

=== Approaching urban design ===
Contemporary perception of public space has now branched and grown into a multitude of non-traditional sites with a variety of uses in mind. For this reason, the way in which design deals with public space has become increasingly diverse and difficult to define.

Iris Aravot puts forward an interesting approach to the urban design process, with the idea of the 'narrative-myth'. Aravot argues that "conventional analysis and problem-solving methods result in fragmentation...of the authentic experience of a city...[and] something of the liveliness of the city as a singular entity is lost." The process of developing a narrative-myth in urban design involves analysing and understanding the unique aspects of the local culture based on Cassirer's five distinctive "symbolic forms". They are myth and religion, art, language, history and science; aspects often disregarded by professional practice. Aravot suggests that the narrative-myth "imposes meaning specifically on what is still inexplicable", i.e. the essence of a city.

== Space Design ==
Space design is defined as the "art and science of designing and arranging physical spaces to make them more conducive to human flourishing and wellbeing. This process involves considering factors such as lighting, colour, furniture layout, and overall atmosphere to create a space that is both efficient and engaging for its users. Space design is commonly employed in a variety of settings, including homes, offices, restaurants, and retail stores, to name a few.

=== Primary goals ===
One of the primary goals of space design is to create an environment that promotes positive emotional responses in its occupants. Studies have shown that people have a natural inclination towards certain types of spaces, such as those with natural lighting, open layouts, and comfortable seating. Another important consideration in space design is the concept of flow, or the ease with which people can move through a space. This involves designing spaces that are intuitive and free from obstructions, allowing users to navigate them without feeling frustrated or disoriented.

One crucial aspect of space design is the creation of a welcoming and inclusive environment that satisfies people's social and emotional needs outside of their home and work. This is often referred to as the "third place" concept, which describes public locales of social interaction that provide psychological comfort and emotional support.

== See also ==
- Agora
- Busking
- Community centre
- Enclosure
- Footpath
- Freedom of panorama
- Girls at Dhabas
- Guerrilla gardening
- History of public library advocacy
- Leisure centre
- Museum
- Mobility transition
- Principles of Intelligent Urbanism
- Public
- Public art
- Public display of affection
- Public indecency
- Public land
- Public library advocacy
- Public nudity
- Reclaim the Streets
- Speakers' Corner
- Street photography
- Terrorism Act 2000 (UK law)
- Toronto Public Space Committee
- Third place (community)
- Urban design
- Urban vitality
- Village green

== Bibliography ==
- Carmona, Matthew (2019). "Principles for public space design, planning to do better". URBAN DESIGN International. 24: 47–59. doi:10.1057/s41289-018-0070-3.
- Li, Juan; Dang, Anrong; Song, Yan (2022). "Defining the ideal public space: A perspective from the publicness". Journal of Urban Management. 11 (4): 479–487. doi:10.1016/j.jum.2022.08.005. hdl:10419/271482.
- Low, Setha M. (2023). Why Public Space Matters. New York: Oxford University Press. ISBN 9780197543733.
- Sonia Curnier (2023). Universal Singular. Public Space Design of the Early 21st Century. Basel/Berlin/Boston: Birkhäuser Verlag, ISBN 978-3-0356-2094-8.
- Hoidn, Barbara. “Demo:Polis –The Right to Public Space” in Tom Bieling (Ed.): Design (&) Activism: Perspectives on Design as Activism and Activism as Design, Milano: Mimesis, 2019, p. 87–96 ISBN 978-8869772412
- Illegal to be Homeless. National Coalition for the Homeless (2004).
- Maasik, Sonia, and Jack Solomon. Signs of Life in the USA Readings on Popular Culture for Writers. Boston: Bedford/St. Martin's, 2006.
- Malone, K. "Children, Youth and Sustainable Cities". Local Environment 6 (1).
- "Conclusions of the International Seminar on the Planning of Collectively-Used Spaces in Towns", in: Monumentum (Louvain), Vol. 18–19, 1979, pp. 129–135.
