= San Domenico, Cesena =

Roman Catholic church in Emilia-Romagna, Italy

Coordinates: 44.13743°N 12.23846°E

San Domenico is a Roman Catholic church located on Viale Mazzoni, 32 in Cesena, region of Emilia-Romagna, Italy.

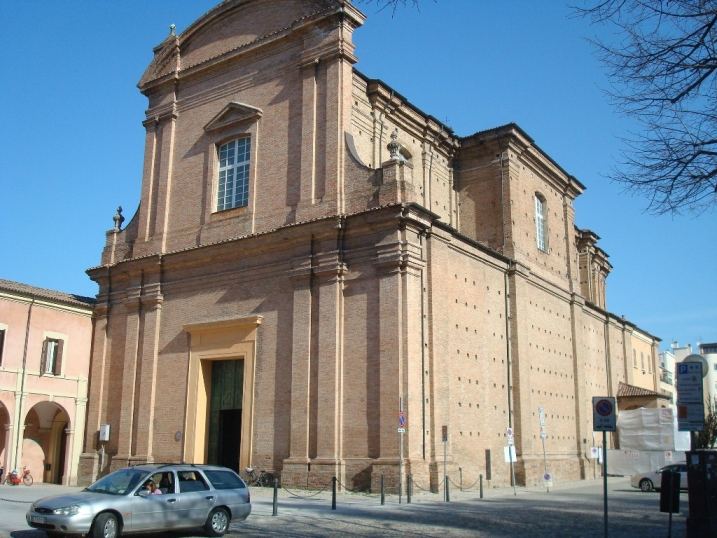
Facade of San Domenico

== History ==
A church at the site was erected first in 1240, inspired by the sermons of San Pietro Martire. The original church stood against medieval walls. This was replaced by a reconstruction in 1383 patronized by Galeotto I Malatesta. Construction of the church we see today took place from 1706 to 1725 (or 1722), using designs of the architect Francesco Zondini.

The painting was looted of much of its original collections, but acquired others from other suppressed institutions in the town, including paintings by Cristoforo Serra and Cristoforo Savolini. Savolini painted the altarpiece of San Donnino. Other works in the church include a Miracle of St Aldebrando originally at church of Santa Croce in Rimini, by Andrea Mainardi; a Madonna and Child, Saints Anne, Francis di Sales, and Carlo Borromeo by Felice Torelli; and a St Bishop and Martyr (circa 1660) by Guido Cagnacci.
