= Giovanni Battista Razzani =

Italian painter

Giovanni Battista Razzani (1603 - 1666) was an Italian painter of the Baroque period.

He was born in Cesena, in the region of Emilia-Romagna, but little is known of his training. He was a contemporary of Cristoforo Serra, and also painted many altarpieces and portraits in Cesena. The paintings depicting Ecstasy of San Guarino and Portrait of Frate Tommaso da Caltagirone are in the Pinacoteca of Cesena. He also painted for the church of Sant'Agostino, Cesena.
