= Pinacoteca Comunale di Cesena =

Art museum in Cesena, Italy

Coordinates: 44°8′16″N 12°14′52″E

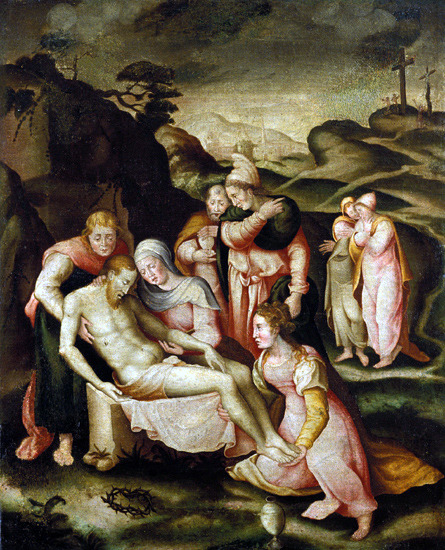
Deposizione di Cristo of Giovanni Battista Bertucci.

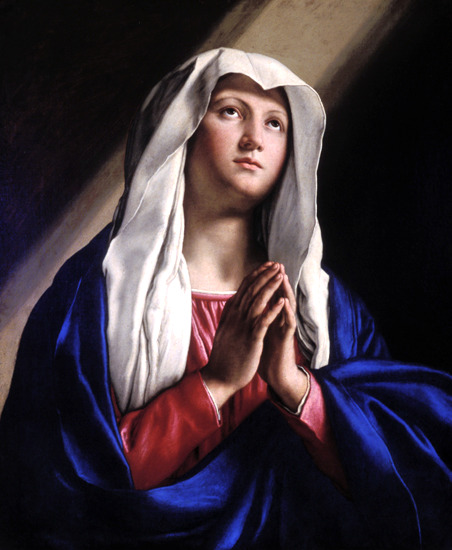
Vergine in preghiera con gli occhi rivolti verso il cielo of Sassoferrato.

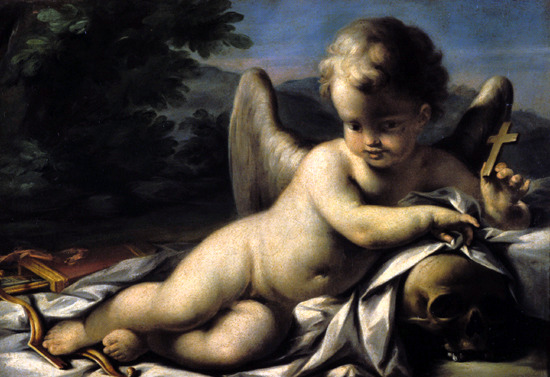
Il Genio della Morte of forlivese peinter.

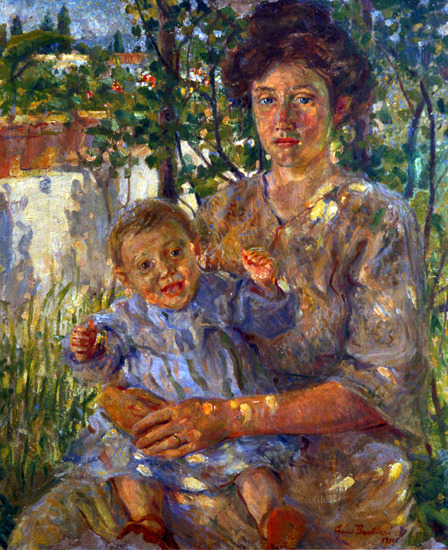
Madre con bambino of Gino Barbieri.

The collections of the Pinacoteca Comunale di Cesena, in Cesena, Italy, contain works by:

- Antonio Aleotti (Argenta, doc. from 1494 – Cesena, 1527)
- Francesco Andreini (painter) (Cesena, 1697–1751)
  - Allegory of Charity
  - Portrait of Cardinal Francesco Locatelli
- Vincenzo Baldacci (Cesena, known from 1802 to 1813)
- Giovanni Francesco Barbieri, (Guercino) (Cento, 1591 – Bologna, 1666)
  - St Francis receives stigmata
- Giovanni Battista Bertucci the younger (Faenza, 1539–1614)
- Giacomo Francesco Cipper, known as Todeschini (Feldkirch, 1664 – Milan, 1736)
- Vittorio Matteo Corcos, (1859, Livourne -1933, Florence)
- Antonio Cardile, (Taranto, 1914 – Roma, 1986)
- Bartolomeo Coda (son of Benedetto Coda (Rimini, doc. from 1516 to 1563)
- Girolamo Forabosco (Venice, 1605 – Padua, 1679)
  - Either Suicide by Sophonisba or Artemisia drinks the ashes of her husband Mausolo
- Bartolomeo Gennari (Cento, 1594 – Bologna, 1661)
- Anselmo Gianfanti (Montiano, 1857 – Cesena, 1903)
- Costantino Guidi (Cesena, 1832–1899)
- Renato Guttuso (Bagheria, 1911 – Roma, 1987)
- Eberhart Keilhau, known as Monsù Bernardo (Helsingør, 1624 – Rome, 1687)
- Francesco Longhi (Ravenna, 1554–1618)
- Girolamo Marchesi da Cotignola (Cotignola, c. 1490 – Bologna, c. 1559)
- Giuseppe Milani (Fontanellato, c. 1716 – Cesena, 1798)
- Bartolomeo Passerotti (Bologna, 1529–1592)
  - Portrait of young musician
- Enea Peroni (Cesena, 1810 c. – doc. to 1844)
- Giovanni Battista Piazzetta (Venice, 1683–1754)
  - Sacrifice of Iphigenia
- Antonio Pio (Cesena, 1809 – London, 1871)
- Agostino Plachesi (Cesena, c. 1725–1805)
- Francesco Raibolini, known as Francia (Bologna, 1450 c. – 1517)
  - Madonna and child - Presentation at temple
- Giovanni Battista Razzani (Cesena, 1603–1666)
- Gasparo Sacchi (Imola, active c. 1517–1536)
- Scipione Sacco (Sogliano sul Rubicone, 1495 – Cesena, 1558)
- Giovanni Battista Salvi, (Sassoferrato, 1609 – Rome, 1685)
  - Archangel Gabriel & Virgin receiving annunciation
  - Madonna and child
  - Sorrowful Virgin
  - Praying Virgin
- Cristoforo Serra (Cesena, 1600–1689)
