= Antonio Pio (painter) =

Italian painter

Antonio Pio (1809 in Cesena – 1871 in London) was an Italian painter, depicting history, literary themes, and genre pieces.

He studied in Rome at the Accademia di San Luca under Tommaso Minardi, worked in Cesena during the 1840s, after which he moved around for many years, between the cities of Florence, Paris and London, where he died in 1871. Pio was also a portrait painter, and painted a “Pastorello” now in the Pinacoteca Comunale di Cesena. He painted an Apotheosis of Dante for the Sipario of the Municipal theater of Cesena.
