= Art collection of Fondazione Cassa di Risparmio di Cesena =

Museum in Emilia-Romagna, Italy

Gallery of Antique Art
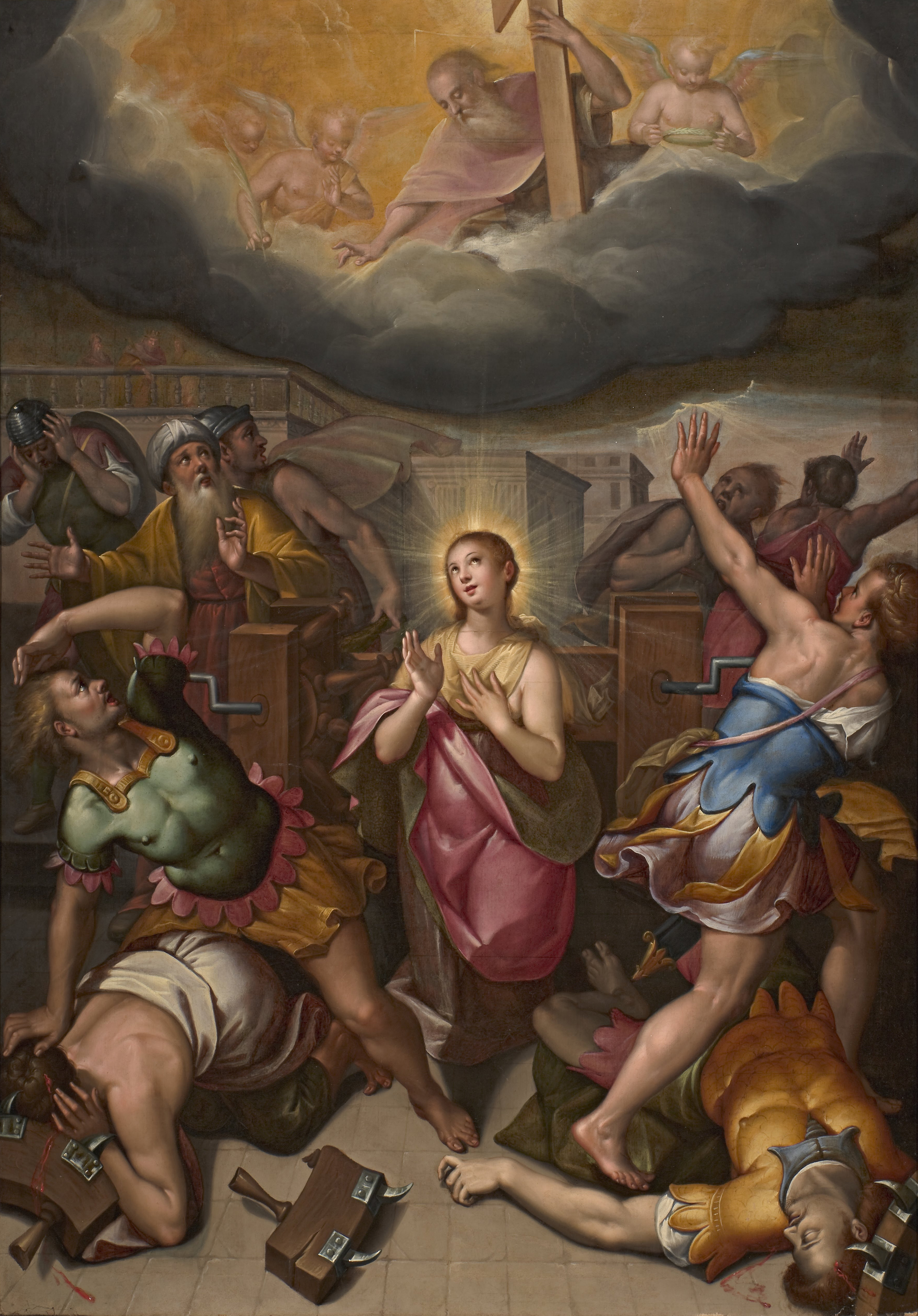
- Saint Catherine of Alexandria and the Miracle of the Wheel
- Location: Cesena, Italy
- Type: artists from Emilia-Romagna
- Website: www.fondazionecarispcesena.it/galleria-dei-dipinti-antichi

The Galleria dei dipinti antichi di Crédit Agricole Italia e della Fondazione Cassa di Risparmio di Cesena (transl. Crédit Agricole Italia and Fondazione Cassa di Risparmio di Cesena Gallery of Antique Art) is a small, publicly-exhibited collection of works by artists mainly from Emilia-Romagna. The works were collected by Cesena's saving bank Cassa di Risparmio di Cesena and Fondazione Cassa di Risparmio di Cesena, the bank's owning organisation. The collection spans works from the 15th century to the 19th century, and was accumulated mostly over the last 2-3 decades. Since 1991, it has been displayed in the former monastery of the Celestines, the central offices of the bank, which was merged in 2018 into Crédit Agricole Italia.

== Collection ==
Painter	Lifespan	Work
Maestro dei Baldraccani		Madonna in Adoration of Child
Giovanni Francesco Barbieri (Guercino)		
Giovanni Antonio Bazzi (il Sodoma)	1477-1549	Holy Family and St. John the Baptist
Nicola Bertuzzi	1710-1777	Moses and bronze serpent
Brocchi da Imola, P.P.		Christ at the Column
Dionigio Brusasorci	c. 1515-1567	Suicide of Cleopatra
Baldassarre Carrari	c. 1460 - c. 1516	Saints Cristopher and Stephen
Benedetto Coda	c. 1495- c. 1533	St. Jerome Penitent
Guido Cagnacci		Allegory of Vanity and Penitence & St. Andrew
Denys Calvaert	c. 1540-1619	Martyrdom of St. Catherine of Alexandria & Suicide of Cleopatra
Domenico Maria Canuti	1626-1684	Madonna & child with young St. John the Baptist
Bartolomeo Cesi	1556-1629	Crucifixion with Madonna and Saints
Giuseppe Maria Crespi	1679-1740	Holy Family
Donato Creti	1671-1749	Death of the Virgin
Ferrau Fenzoni	1562-1645	Conversion of Paul
Francesco Fernandi	1679-1740	The Sacrifice of Noah
Sebastiano Filippi		Holy Family & John the Baptist
Fontana L.		Adoration by shepherds
Prospero Fontana		
Marcantonio Franceschini	1648-1729	Embrace of Justice & Peace
Studio of Marcantonio Franceschini	ibid	Penitent Magdalen
Gaetano Gandolfi		Madonna of the Rosary and child
Benedetto Gennari II	1633-1715	
Giovanni Lanfranco		La pioggia delle coturnici & Pietà
Luca Longhi	1507-1580	Madonna with child & Saints Sebastian & Rocco
Girolamo Marchesi	1471-1550	Adoration by Magi
Maestro di Marradi		Madonna & child & St. John and two angels & Enthroned Madonna & child
Marco Palmezzano	1459/63-1539	Madonna & child enthroned, Christ carrying cross, & Madonna and child enthroned giving benediction
Giuseppe Palmieri	1674-1740	Ecstasy of St. Mary Magdalen
Lorenzo Pasinelli	1629-1700	Diana at the Bath with nymphs
Bartolomeo Passerotti		Portrait of woman with little dog
Teramo Piaggio		Santa Scolastica enthroned & Saints John evangelist, Anthony Abbot, Sebastian & Bernard of Clairvaux
Bartolomeo Ramenghi	c. 1484 - c. 1542	Madonna and child & Saints Francis & Jerome
Giovanni Battista Ramenghi		Holy Family with St. Catherine
Nicolas Régnier	1591-1667	St. John the Baptist at the Fountain
Matteo Rosselli	1578-1650	Sacrifice of Isaac
Maestro di San Miniato		Madonna and Child Enthroned and Saints Donato and Anthony Abott
Santi di Tito	1536-1602/3	Holy Family with juvenile John the Baptist
Giuseppe Vermiglio		Sacrifice of Isaac
Cristoforo Savolini	1639—1677	Death of Seneca & St John Baptist in Desert
Scarsellino	c. 1550-1620	Flagellation of Christ
A. di Jacopo del Sellaio		Madonna and child enthroned with St. Benedict and beatified nun
Elisabetta Sirani		
Giovanni Andrea Sirani		Angelica si sottrae a Ruggero con l'incantesimo dell'anello
Cristoforo Serra		
Giovanni Gioseffo dal Sole	1654-1719	Artemisia with the cup of ashes of her husband Mausolo
Lionello Spada		Christ resurrects the son of widow of Naim
Alessandro Tiarini		
Domenico Maria Viani	1668-1711	Jove in love with Ceres

== Gallery ==
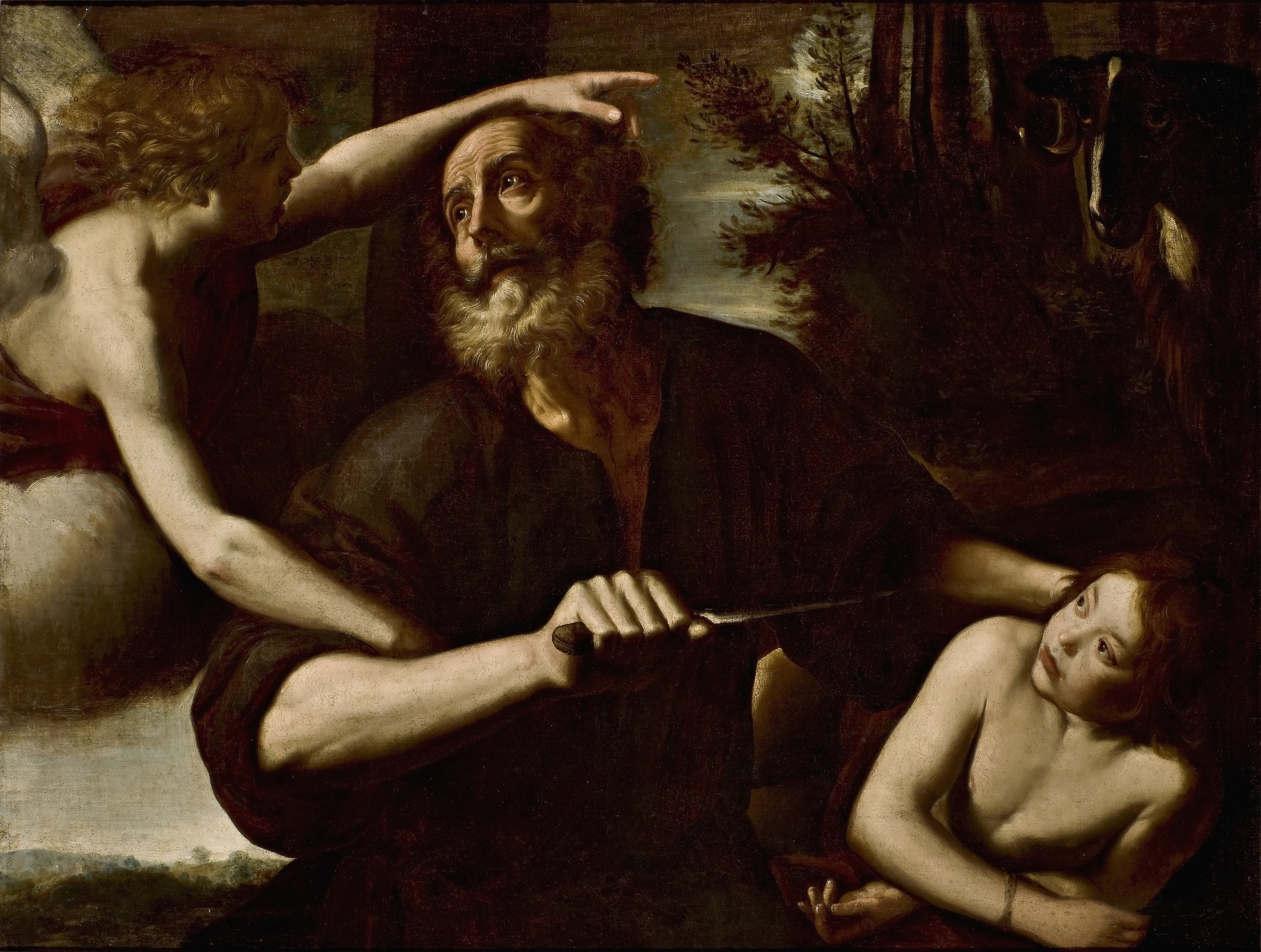
Giuseppe Vermiglio
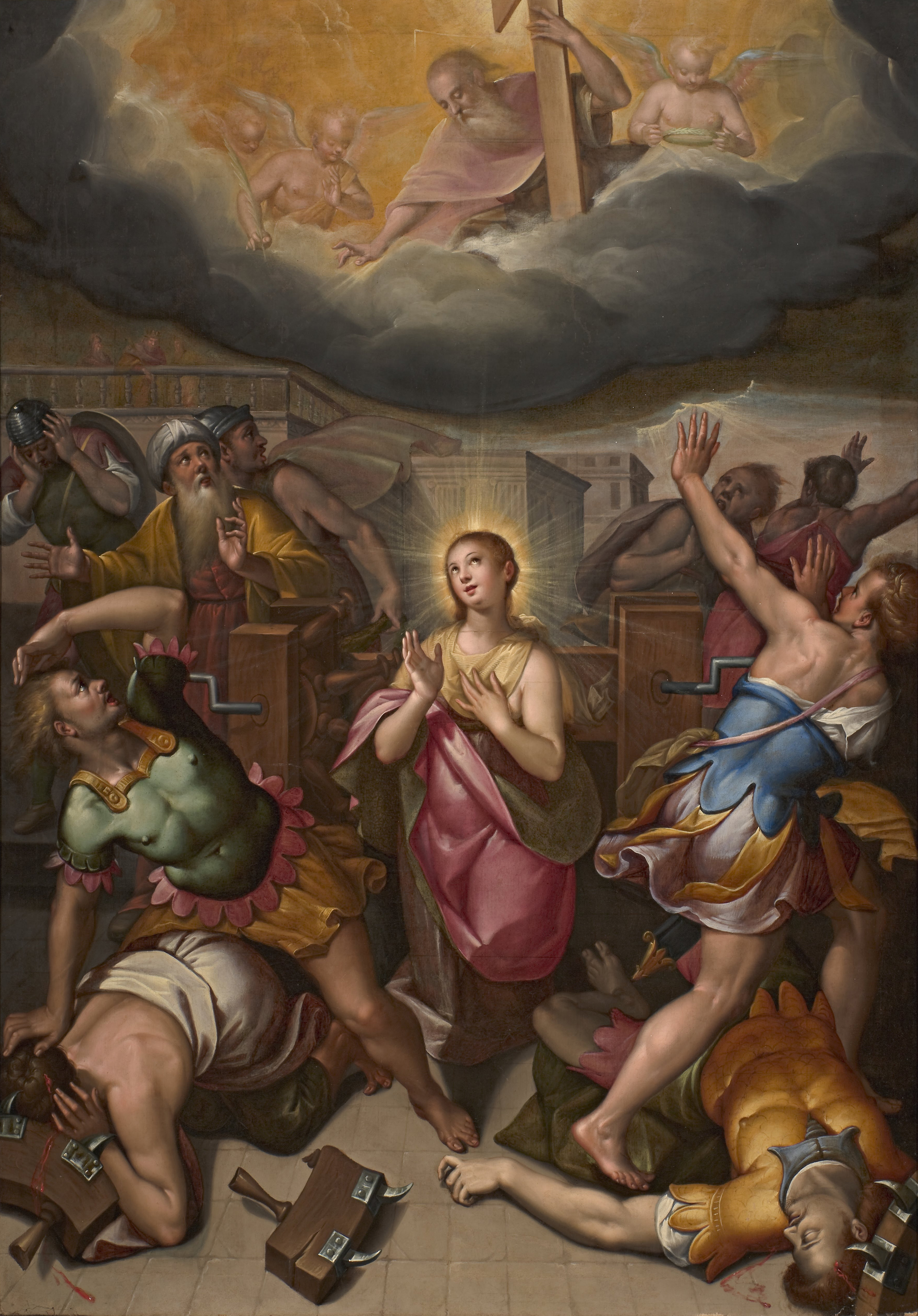
Calvaert Denys

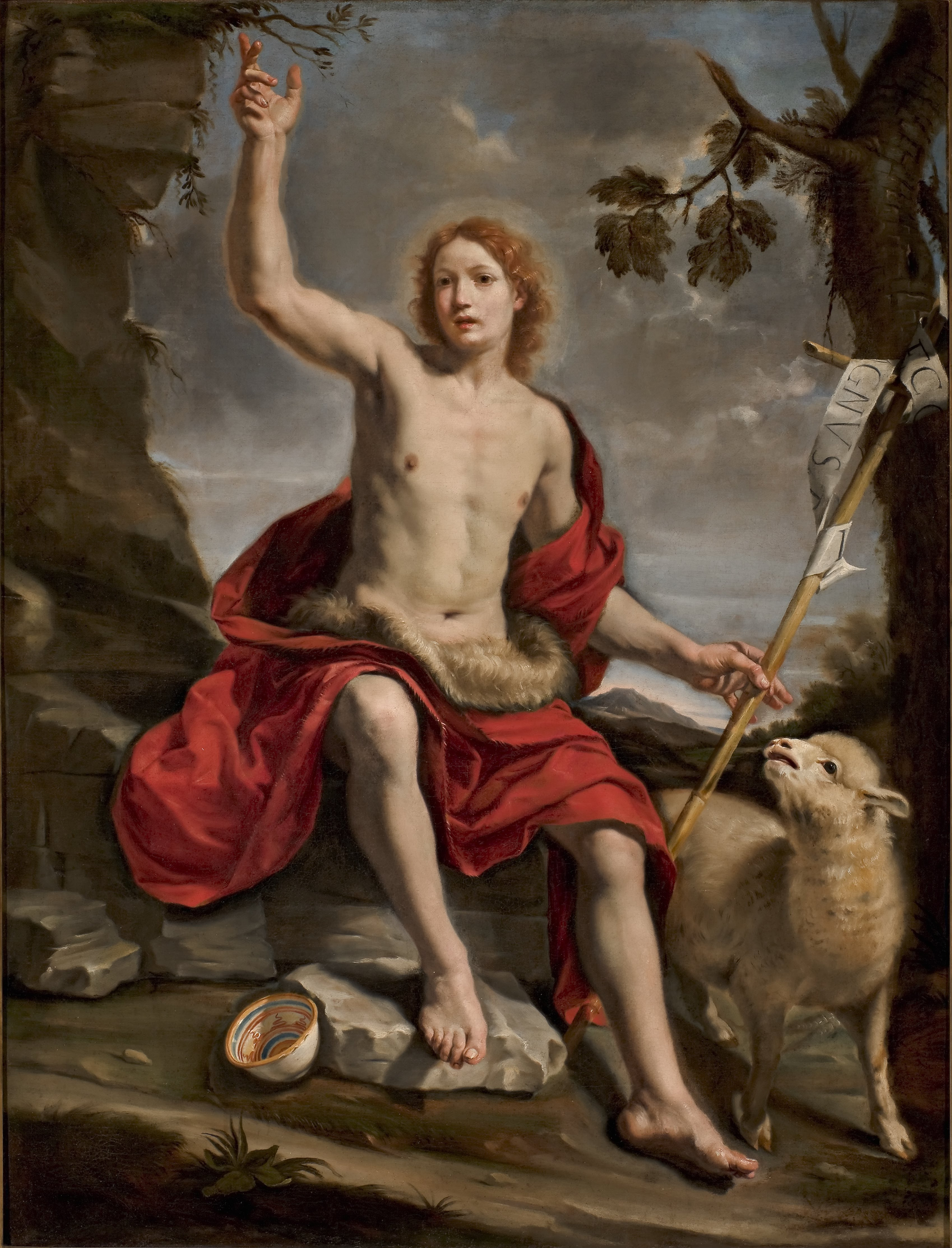
Cristoforo Savolini
