= Antonio Aleotti =

Italian painter

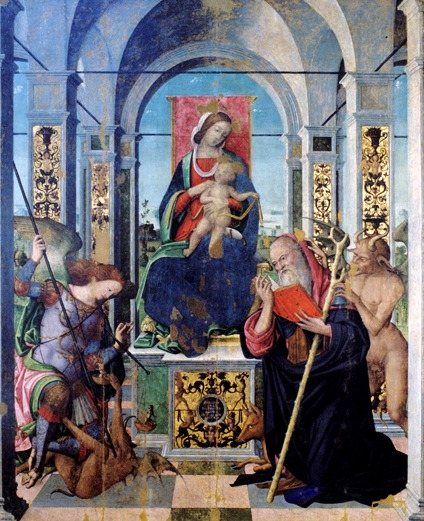
Madonna in trono con il Bambino, Sant'Antonio Abate e l'Arcangelo Michele di Antonio Aleotti, 1510 (Pinacoteca Comunale di Cesena)

Antonio Aleotti (died 1527) was an Italian painter, first mentioned in records in 1494 and active in Ferrara. Born in Argenta, he is also known as Antonio dell'Argento. He painted frescoes in the Chiesa della Morte in Ferrara.

His altarpiece of the Virgin and child enthroned, with St Anthony the Abbot and the Archangel Michael was painted in 1510 for the Hospital of Saint Antonio in Cesena, and is now in the city's art gallery.

He died in Cesena in 1527.

== Gallery ==
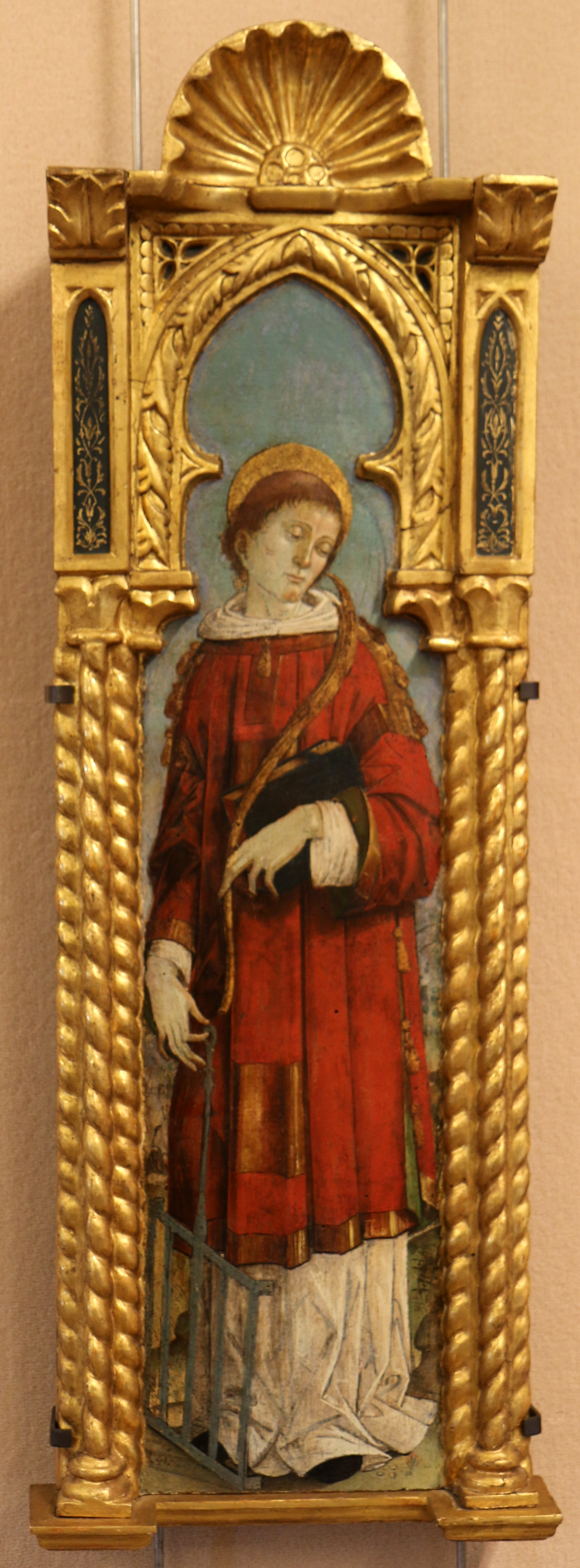
Saint Lawrence

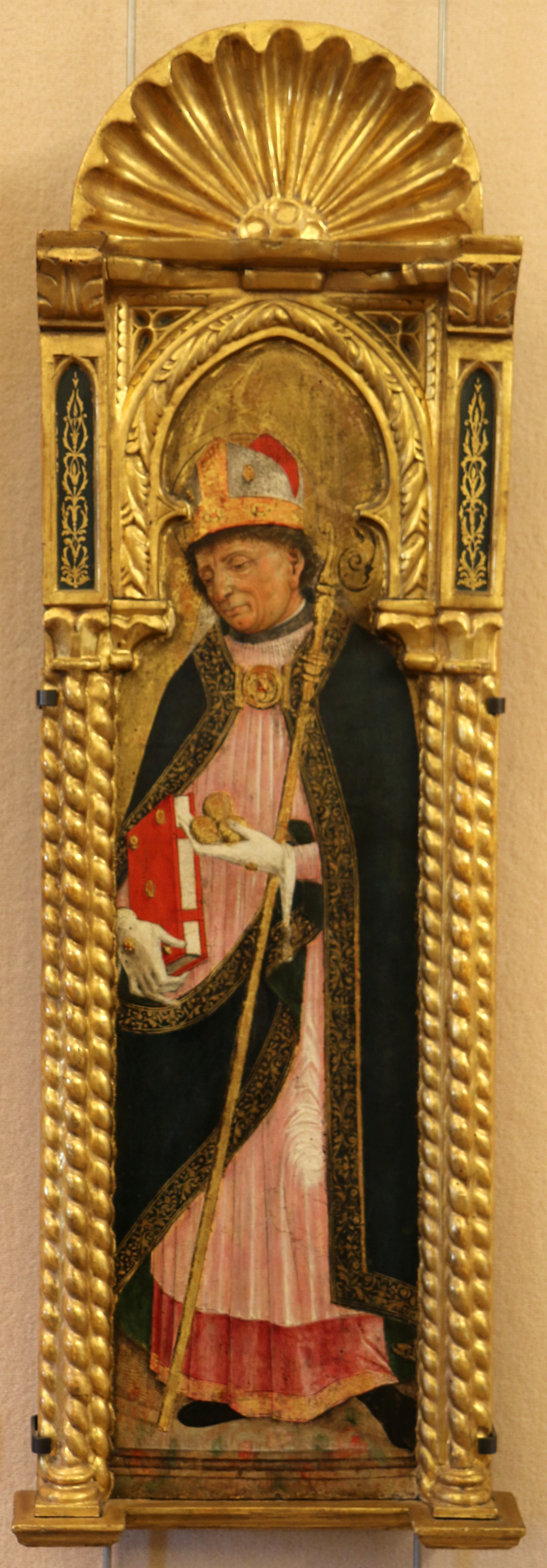
Saint Nicholas

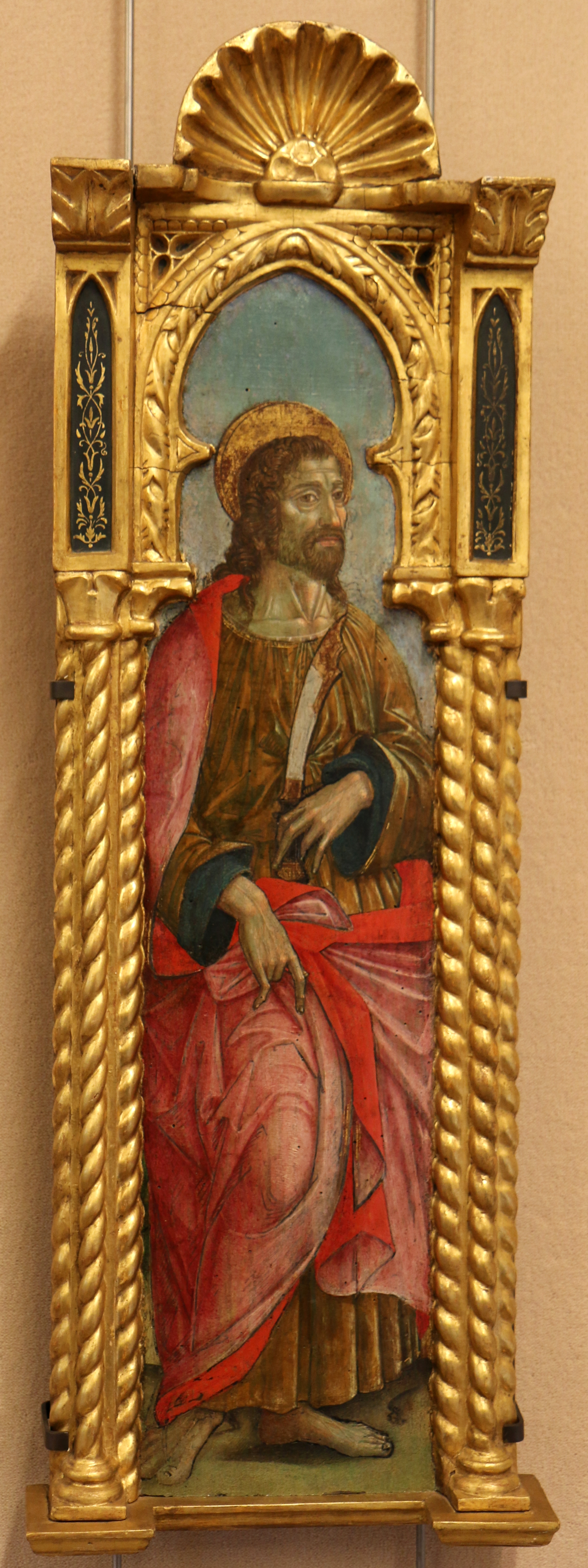
Saint Bartholomew

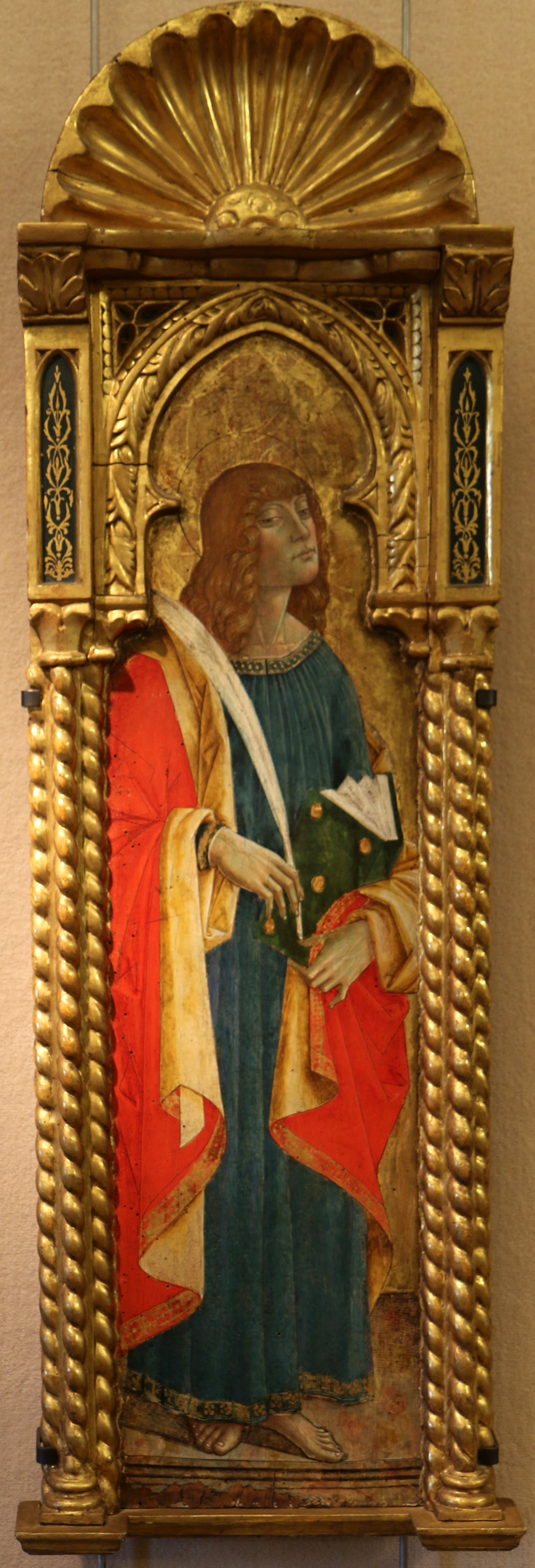
Saint John

== Sources ==
- Bryan, Michael (1886). Robert Edmund Graves (ed.). Dictionary of Painters and Engravers, Biographical and Critical. Vol. I A-K. London: George Bell and Sons. p. 17.
