= Sant'Agostino, Cesena =

Baroque-style Roman Catholic church

Coordinates: 44.1356°N 12.2440°E

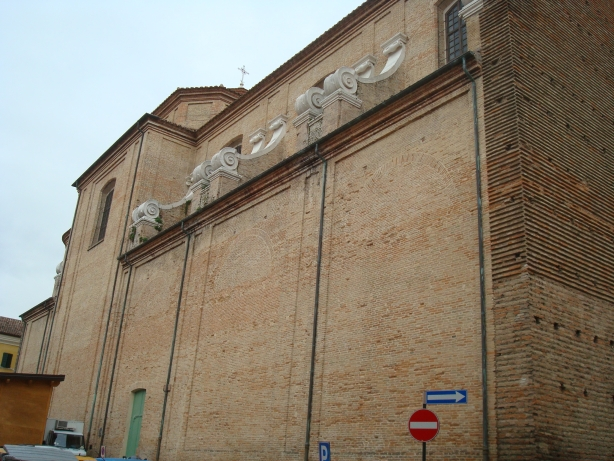
Side Facade of the Basilica of Sant'Agostino, Cesena, Italy

Sant'Agostino is a Baroque-style Roman Catholic church located on Via Scevola Riceputi #1, in Cesena, region of Emilia-Romagna, Italy.

== History ==
A church and convent at the site was erected in 1252, which was manned by the Franciscan Friars (Padri Riformati dell'Osservanza). Violante da Montefeltro, wife of Malatesta Novello, commissioned a reconstruction of the church, transferring in 1457 the monks to a convent adjacent to the Chiesa dell'Osservanza in Cesena. Augustinians from the Hermitage of San Giovan Buono, which was located outside Cesena, were then brought here. From 1748 to 1777, commissioning designs by Luigi Vanvitelli, the Augustinians replaced the earlier structure with the present church and convent. The main altarpiece originally was a Virgin in Glory with God the Father, and venerated by the Fathers of the Church by Girolamo Genga; the painting was appropriated by the Napoleonic authorities and transported to the Pinacoteca di Brera. The bell tower was designed by Pietro Carlo Borboni. The main portal by Sebastiano Bernava.

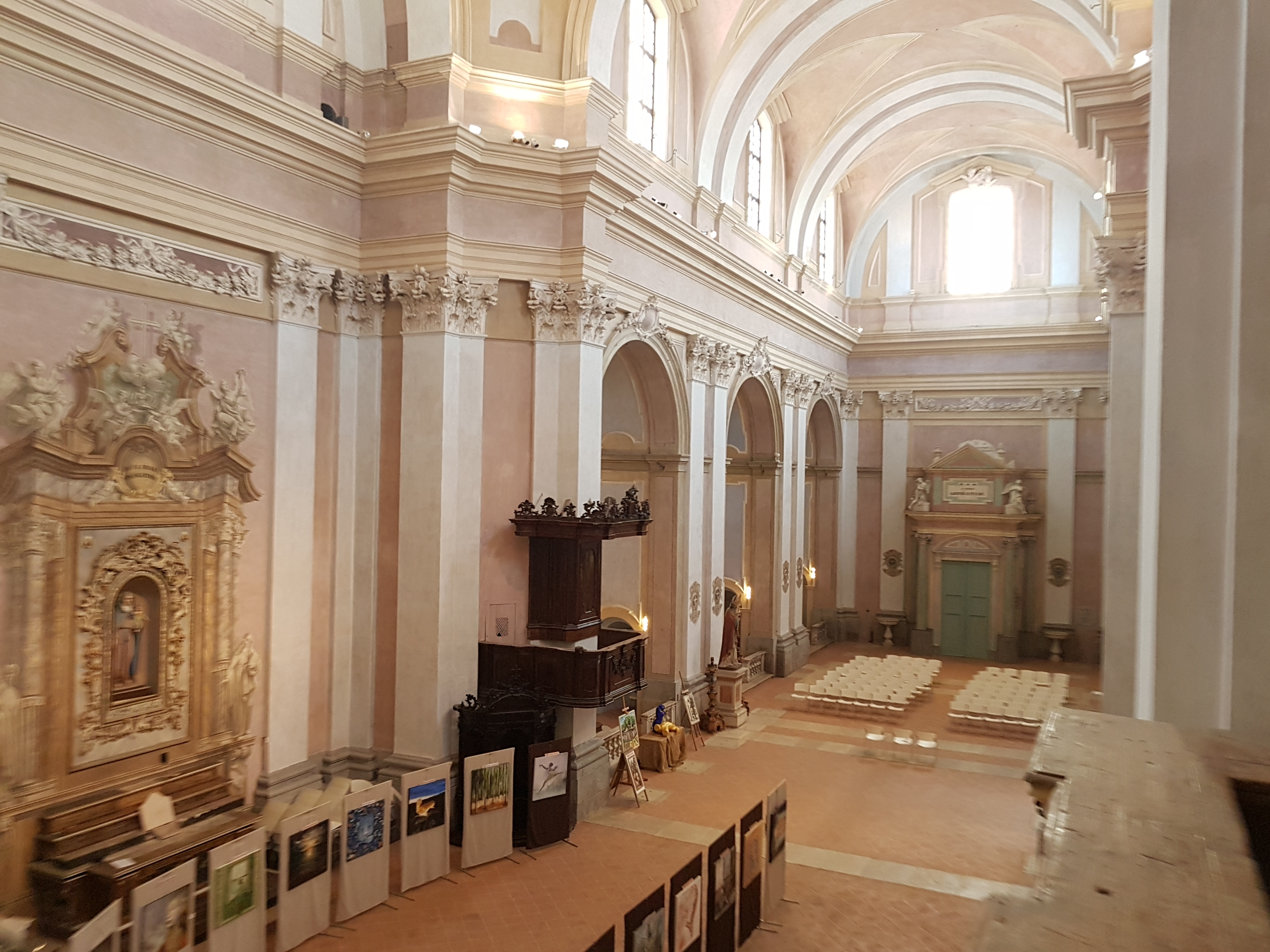
Sant'Agostino Internal Area

== Interior decorations ==
Among the internal decoration now in the church. The paintings for the 1st and 2nd altars on right are by Aureliano Milani. The 3rd altar has an early 14th-century Crucifixion scene with polychrome wood statues of the Virgin, John the Baptist. A canvas of the Massacred of the Innocents (1640) was painted by Giovanni Battista Razzani. The canvas depicting the Immaculate Conception and Saints James and Erasmus of Capua (1670) was painted by Cristoforo Serra. The gilded stucco altarpiece was completed by Marcantonio Fava. It was part of a polyptych whose main wooden panel is the Disputation of the Immaculate conception now housed in Brera. The upper sections of the apse now have a copy of Genga's Annunciation (circa 1500), while the original is in the Cesena Cathedral museum. There is also a painting by Bartolomeo Coda.
