= Rocca Malatestiana =

Fourteenth century fortress in Cesena, Italy

Coordinates: 44.136195°N 12.239885°E

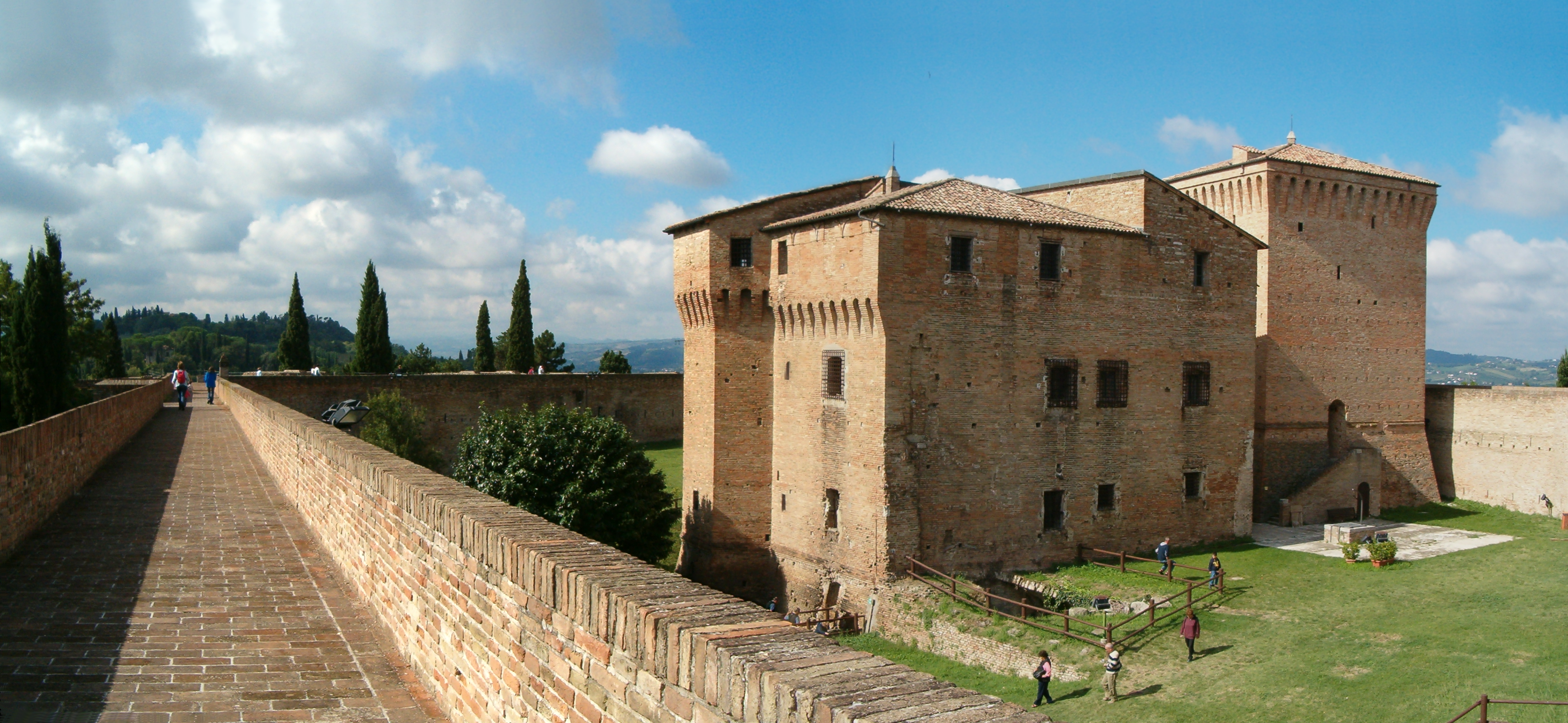
The Rocca Malatestiana Cesena

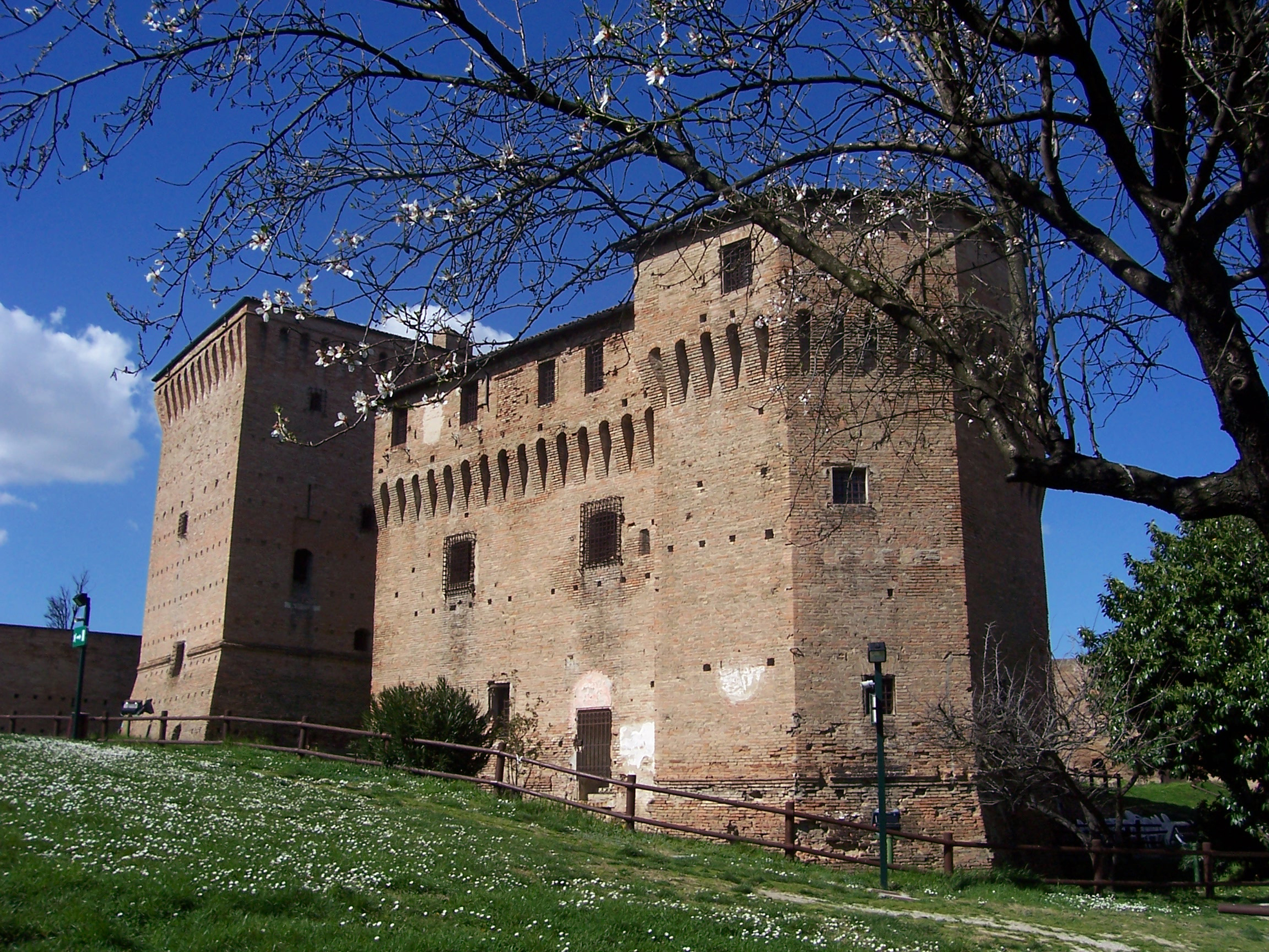
The foemina tower of the Rocca Malatestiana in Cesena.

The Rocca Malatestiana ("Malatestian Stronghold") is a fortress in Cesena, Italy. The current structure is the third fortress built on the site, near the remains of two earlier ones dating to the late Roman and medieval periods.

One of the most imposing fortresses in Romagna, it features a courtyard and two main towers, known as the "Male" and the "Female". The "Female" tower houses the Museum of Agriculture, which presents rural life in Romagna across different eras, while the "Male" tower contains a permanent exhibition of Malatestian ceramics.

== See also ==
- List of castles in Italy
