= Christoph Babbi =

Italian violinist and composer (1748–1814)

- Cristoforo Babbi
- Born: 1748; Cesena, Italy
- Died: 1814 (aged 65–66); Dresden
- Education: Philharmonic Academy of Bologna; Teatro Comunale di Bologna
- Occupations: Violinist and composer

Christoph Babbi, also known as Cristoforo Babbi, was an Italian violinist and composer. He was born in Cesena in 1748 and died in Dresden in 1814. He was the concert master of the Dresden court and among his works are concerti for violin, quartets, symphonies, and flute duets.

== Biography ==
Babbi studied with Paolo Alberghi during his early years. In 1776, he was admitted to the Philharmonic Academy of Bologna for whom he eventually composed the entrance exam. After this, he became first violinist and conductor at the Teatro Comunale di Bologna. Because of his vast musical talent, he gained the attention of the Saxon court in Dresden, where he was soon invited to become concert master in 1781. He held this office until 1813. From 1805 to 1807, he was also the court's maestro of music.
