= Cristoforo Savolini =

Italian painter (1639–1677)

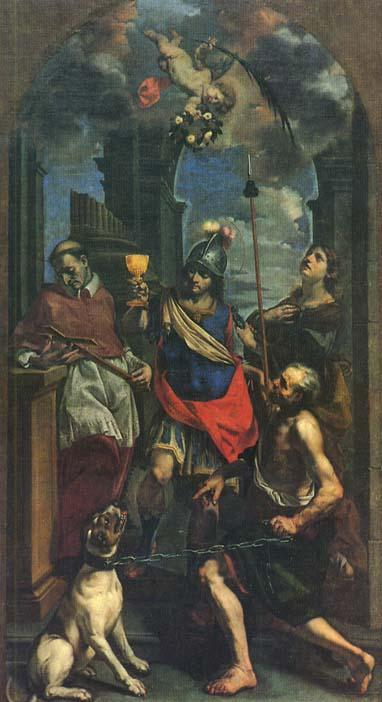
Cristoforo Savolini, Saints Charles Borromeo, Domninus, and Apollonia

Cristoforo Savolini (1639 – 1677) was an Italian painter of the Baroque period, active in the region near Pesaro and his native town of Cesena.

== Biography ==
A student of the Caravaggio-inspired Cristoforo Serra, he was inspired by Guercino and Guido Cagnacci. One of his patrons was the Cesenese Ludovico Ugolini. He painted the altarpiece of San Donnino in the church of San Domenico in Cesena. Savolini died from a riding accident in 1677, aged 38.
