= Giuseppe Palmieri (painter) =

Italian painter

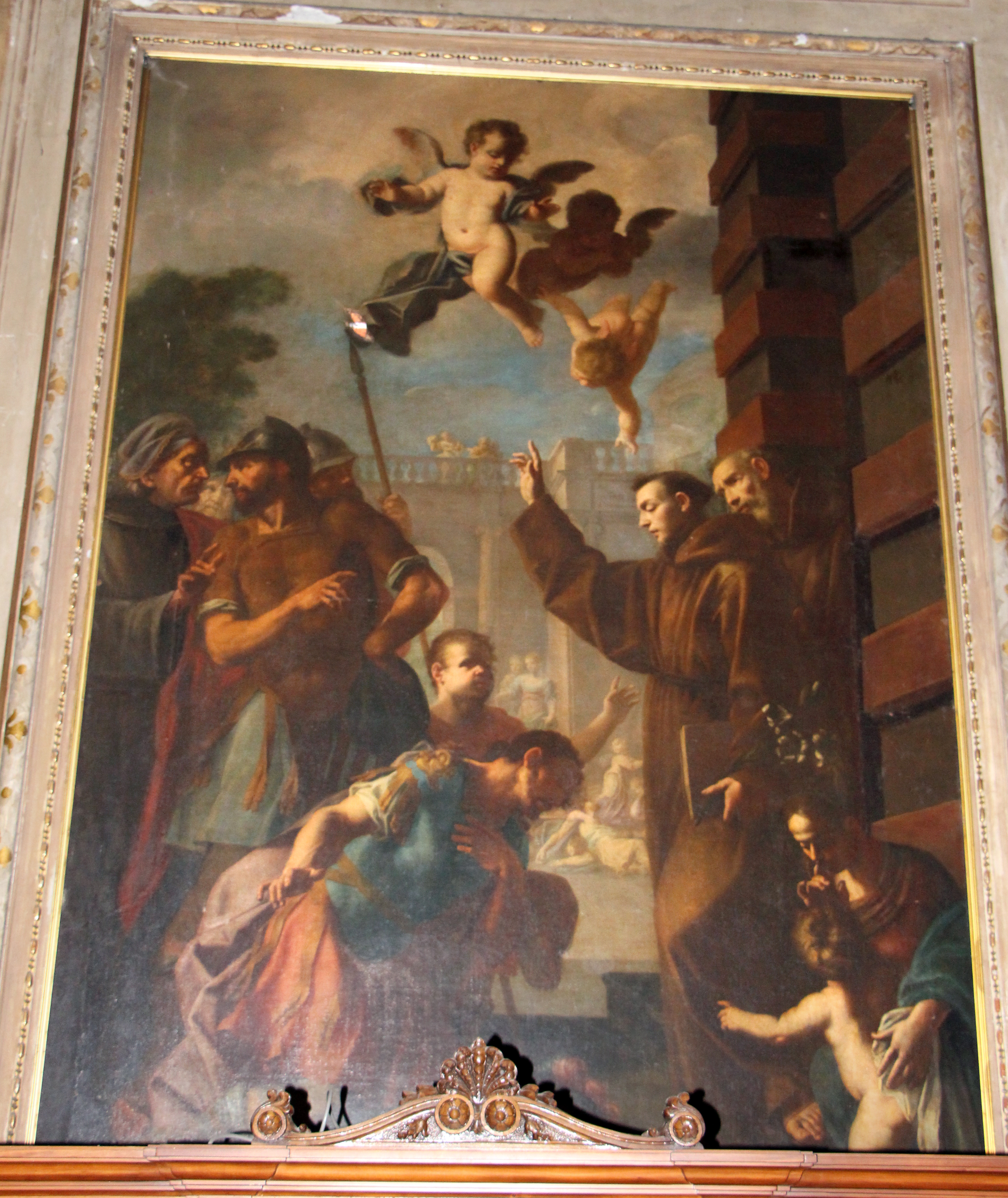
Saint Francis preaches to Ezzelino da Romano, ca. 1690–1700

Giuseppe Palmieri (1674 – 18 May 1740) was an Italian painter of the late Baroque period.

Palmieri was born in Genoa. Orphaned as a baby, he came into the care of an uncle. As a boy, after his uncle died, he was apprenticed to an unidentified Tuscan painter, with whom he travelled through Italy, including a long stay in Sicily. Returning to Genoa, he joined the large studio of Domenico Piola, where he first gained independent commissions. He was very religious, and completed without pay some of his works for the monasteries of the Capuchin Friars (now mostly preserved in the church of the Holy Conception in Genoa). Some pictures depicting hunting scenes were painted for King John V of Portugal. In this style of painting, he was influenced by Castiglione. He fathered many children. He died in Genoa and was buried in the church of St. James of Carignano in Genoa.

== Works ==
During his career, Palmieri produced many works. Below is a list of some of his paintings:

- St. Sebastian in the church of Santa Maria di Castello (Genoa)
- Resurrection and Preaching of San Vincenzo Ferreri in the church of San Domenico (Genoa)
- Virgin in glory with angels in the church of San Lorenzo della Costa at Santa Margherita Ligure
- St. Anthony preaches to the fishes, St. Anthony with the Child Jesus and St. Anthony preaches to Ezzelino da Romano) in the church of Santissima Annunziata of Portoria (also known as the church of St. Catherine of Genoa)
- St. John Nepomuk in the church of the Nativity of the Virgin Mary (Campoligure)
- Virgin and Saints in the church of Santa Caterina (Rossiglione)
- St. Francis in ecstasy in the church of Santa Maria Assunta (La Spezia)
- Christ dying in the Oratory of San Giacomo della Marina (Genoa)
- St. Joseph in the church of Santa Maria Assunta (Camogli)
- Ecstasy of St. Mary Magdalene preserved in the Art collection of Fondazione Cassa di Risparmio di Cesena
- The Flight from Egypt in private collection

The following is a list of fresco works:

- Trinity and Angels in the church of St. Mary Magdalene (Genoa)
- Last Judgment; fresco in the ceiling of the Oratory of Assunta, near the church of Nostra Signora Incoronata, in the quarter of Coronata (Genoa-Cornigliano).
- Apse of the church of Santa Maria delle Vigne (Genoa)
- Oratory of St. Anthony in the Basilica della Santissima Annunziata del Vastato (Genoa)
- Convent of St. Chiara (Genoa-Albaro)
