= Chiesa dell'Osservanza, Cesena =

Church in Cesena, Emilia-Romagna, Italy

Coordinates: 44.1329°N 12.2441°E

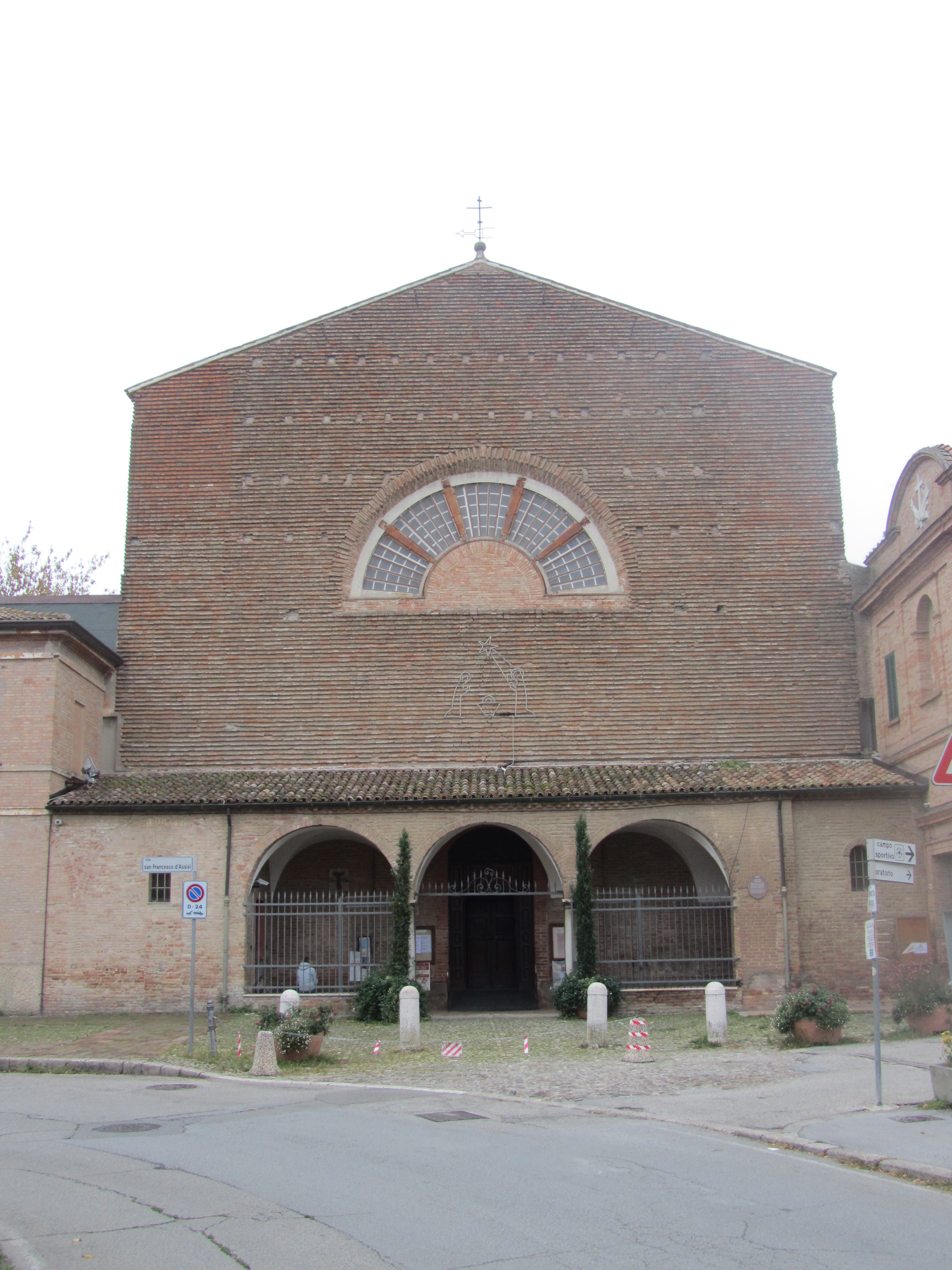
Chiesa dell'Osservanza, Cesena.

The Chiesa dell'Osservanza (Church of the Observance) or Santa Maria Annunziata dell'Osservanza is a Gothic-style, Roman Catholic church located in Viale Osservanza #198 in Cesena, region of Emilia-Romagna, Italy.

== History ==
A church at the site was erected in 1438 by Malatesta Novello after he defeated of the Ghibelline forces in the town. In 1457, Violanta da Montefeltro, wife of Novello, assigned the church, then dedicated to the Virgin of the Annunciation, and soon granted to the Riformati Friars (Riformati dell' Osservanza), who moved here from the church of Sant'Agostino. The church was consecrated in 1471. The church we see today was restructured starting in 1761 and completed in 1791, using designs by Leandro Marconi the elder. He also oversaw the interior neoclassical decoration.

In 1465, Cardinal Bessarion donated to the church, his collection of choral books (for example, see antiphonary), some of which were transferred to the Biblioteca Malatestiana after the suppression of the convent.

The facade is simple, made of brick, with an unusual semicircular round window, and a three arch portico. The interior houses a 16th-century painting of the Madonna della Grazie and The Annunciation by Marcantonio Franceschini. The cloister of the adjacent former convent was designed by Pietro Carlo Borboni. Borboni also played a role in the reconstruction of the church in the 18th century.
