= Lamberto Tacoli =

Italian entrepreneur (born c. 1964)

Lamberto Tacoli (born 1 September 1964) is an Italian entrepreneur. He is the chairman and chief executive officer of Perini Navi S.p.A., specialising in the design and build of superyachts, both sail (Perini Navi) and motor (Picchiotti), as well as President of Nautica Italiana. A sportsman with a passion for football and squash, which he has played for many years at a competitive level.

== Biography ==
Born in Cesena, Italy, Lamberto, di Marcello, di Angelo, Marquises of San Possidonio, is the eldest of the three sons of General Marcello Tacoli, Marquis of San Possidonio (mpr), Marquis (m. ultr), Patrizio of Modena (m), Patrizio of Reggio (m), and of Maria Luciana Mainardis. He married Barbara in 1998 and is the father of Rachele and twins Allegra and Ludovica.

=== Training and the early years of his career ===
Having completed his technical studies at the Istituto Tecnico Commerciale Luigi Settembrini, he specialized in Company Management and Public Relations at KTEMA Bologna. After a short apprenticeship with DUCATI ENERGIA S.p.A. assisting the Sales Department, in 1988 he began his career with Business srl, Bologna as a Coordinator in the International Trade Business offices.

In 1989 he became part of the nautical scene in the role of Sales and Marketing Manager at S.M. ITALIAN YACHTS srl - Fano (PS) which he continued until 1994, and held the post of CEO for a year after that.

=== The entrepreneurial phase ===
In 1996 Lamberto Tacoli embarked on his enterprise, founding with Moschini the Custom Line SpA of Pesaro in which shortly, after the proposal of the young Tacoli, also entered Norberto Ferretti. This was the first Ferretti Group brand that built luxury motoryachts measuring from 30 to 43 metres. Right from the beginning he had the role of General Manager and he kept this position even in 1998 when together with the other shareholders he sold the Ferretti Group shares.

In 2000 Custom Line spa was incorporated with CRN S.p.A.; here he had the role of Sales & Marketing Manager and later, between 2001 and 2006, he became the CEO of CRN and Custom Line.

Besides being the vice president of the sales and marketing departments, in May 2006 he was appointed chairman of CRN S.p.A., a position he still holds today.

In July 2009 he became a member of the board of directors of the Ferretti Group and was appointed general manager of sales and marketing (September 2009 – December 2012).

On 28 May 2010, he was appointed vice president of UCINA Confindustria Nautica (National Union of Shipyards and Nautical and Related Industries).

From 2012 to 2015, Lamberto Tacoli was president and CEO of CRN S.p.A..

In July 2015, Tacoli founded Nautica Italiana as president and established the affiliation with the Altagamma Foundation of which he is vice president.

In May 2017, Lamberto Tacoli was appointed as chairman and CEO of Perini Navi, the world's leading designer and builder of superyachts (Perini Navi and Picchiotti).

== Appointments ==
Tacoli is the chairman and CEO of Perini Navi, President of Nautica Italiana and Vice President of Altagamma.

== See also ==
- Fondazione Altagamma
