= Giuseppe Palmas =

Italian photojournalist

- Born: January 6, 1918; Cesena, Italy
- Died: July 22, 1977 (aged 59)
- Occupation: Photojournalist
- Years active: 1946–1970s
- Employer: Corriere Lombardo
- Known for: Celebrity photography (1950s–1960s)

Giuseppe Palmas (6 January 1918 – 22 July 1977) was an Italian photo journalist famous for his pictures of celebrities taken in the 1950s–1960s.

He was born in Cesena, Italy, and in 1946, he started working as a journalist for Corriere Lombardo in Milan and in 1953 moved to Rome. Later he returned to his native Cesena.
