= Piazza del Popolo, Cesena =

Main square in Cesena old town, Italy

Coordinates: 44°08′14″N 12°14′31″E

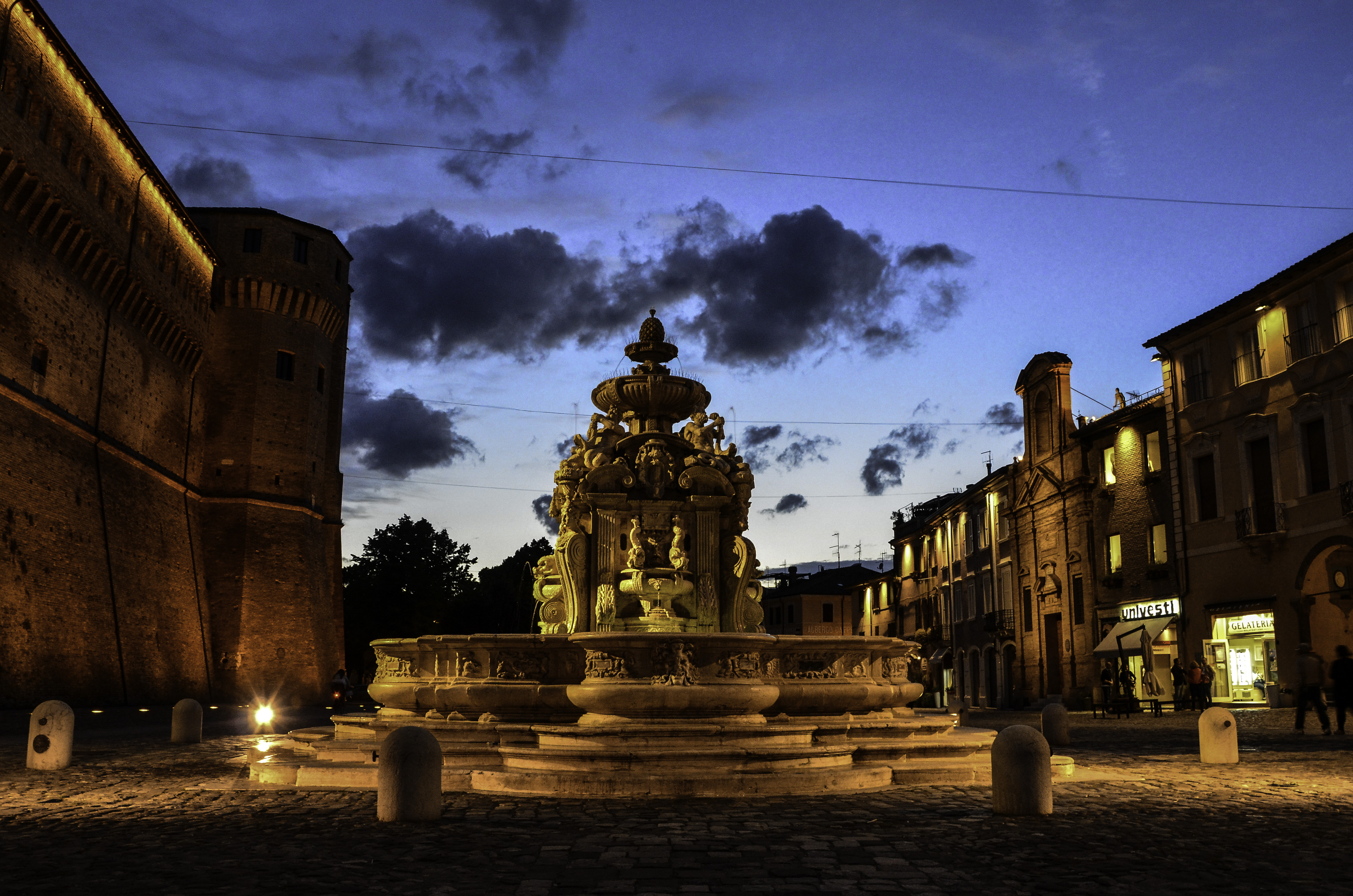
Piazza del Popolo

The Piazza del Popolo ("People's Square") is located at the heart of Cesena, Italy, and offers some of the most interesting town sights.

In the middle of the square there stands the Mannerist Fontana del Masini (1588–91), designed by the local painter-architect Francesco Masini, in collaboration, for the hydraulics, with Tommaso Laureti. On the southern side of the square there stands the Palazzo Comunale (Town Hall). Next to the Palazzo Comunale there are Loggetta Veneziana and Rocchetta di Piazza, built in the 15th century.

The Chiesa dei Santi Anna e Gioacchino (Church of St. Anna and St. Gioacchino) takes up the northern side of the square. During the fascist period the name of the square was "Piazza Vittorio Emanuele", honoring the king; the name "Piazza del Popolo" was restored after the second world war.

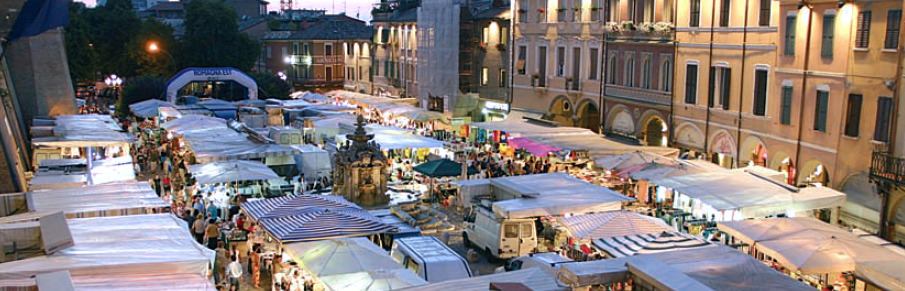
Piazza del Popolo
