= Abbey of St Maria del Monte =

Benedictine monastery in Cesena, Italy

Abbey of St. Mary of the Mountain
- Abbazia Santa Maria del Monte
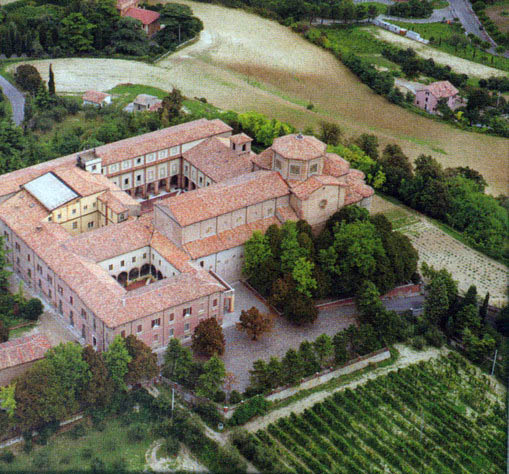
- Interactive map of Abbey of St. Mary of the Mountain

Monastery information
- Order: Order of St. Benedict
- Established: 1001
- Diocese: Cesena-Sarsina

Site
- Coordinates: 44.1319°N 12.2551°E

The Abbey of Santa Maria del Monte (St. Mary of the Mountain) is a Benedictine monastery in Cesena, Italy. This imposing building stands on the Colle Spaziano (Spaziano Hill).

== History ==
The abbey was founded about the year 1001 and completed by 1026, in connection with a small church which housed the remains of St. Mauro, a Benedictine monk who had been the Bishop of Cesena in the first half of the 10th century, and who had the custom of climbing the hill on which the abbey stands in order to pray. His vita was written by the Camaldolese monk and cardinal, Peter Damian. The abbey was confirmed in 1059 by a papal bull of Pope Nicholas II.

The abbey benefited greatly when it received the Emperor Frederic Barbarossa as a guest in 1177. The emperor gave the abbey his protection and bestowed a large grant of land to the community. In 1317, Robert of Anjou donated two columns lying on the grounds of the monastery to the monastery of Santa Chiara he and his wife were building in Naples. It is supposed that the columns were brought from Jerusalem by Barbarossa.

In 1356, however, the ruler of Forlì, Francesco II Ordelaffi, seized the monastery and used it as a barracks for his troops. The monks fled for over a year. Upon their return, they found the abbey in ruins. The reconstruction lasted for over a century.

Between 1536 and 1548, the abbey church assumed its present-day appearance on the basis of a design by Domenico Gravini of Brisighella, who used an original design by Bramante. As the centre of the artistic life of Cesena, the Basilica del Monte also benefited from the work of major artists in the region: Scipione Sacco, and Girolamo Longhi. Important works are also attributable to Francesco Morandi, known as the Terribilia, to whom built the dome (decorated by Francesco Masini between 1568 and 1571) and original stone staircase, and to Alessandro Corsi who in 1588 was the creator of the monumental well of the Great Cloister. The church also houses a wooden choir completed in 1575 by Giuseppe d’Alberto di Scalva.

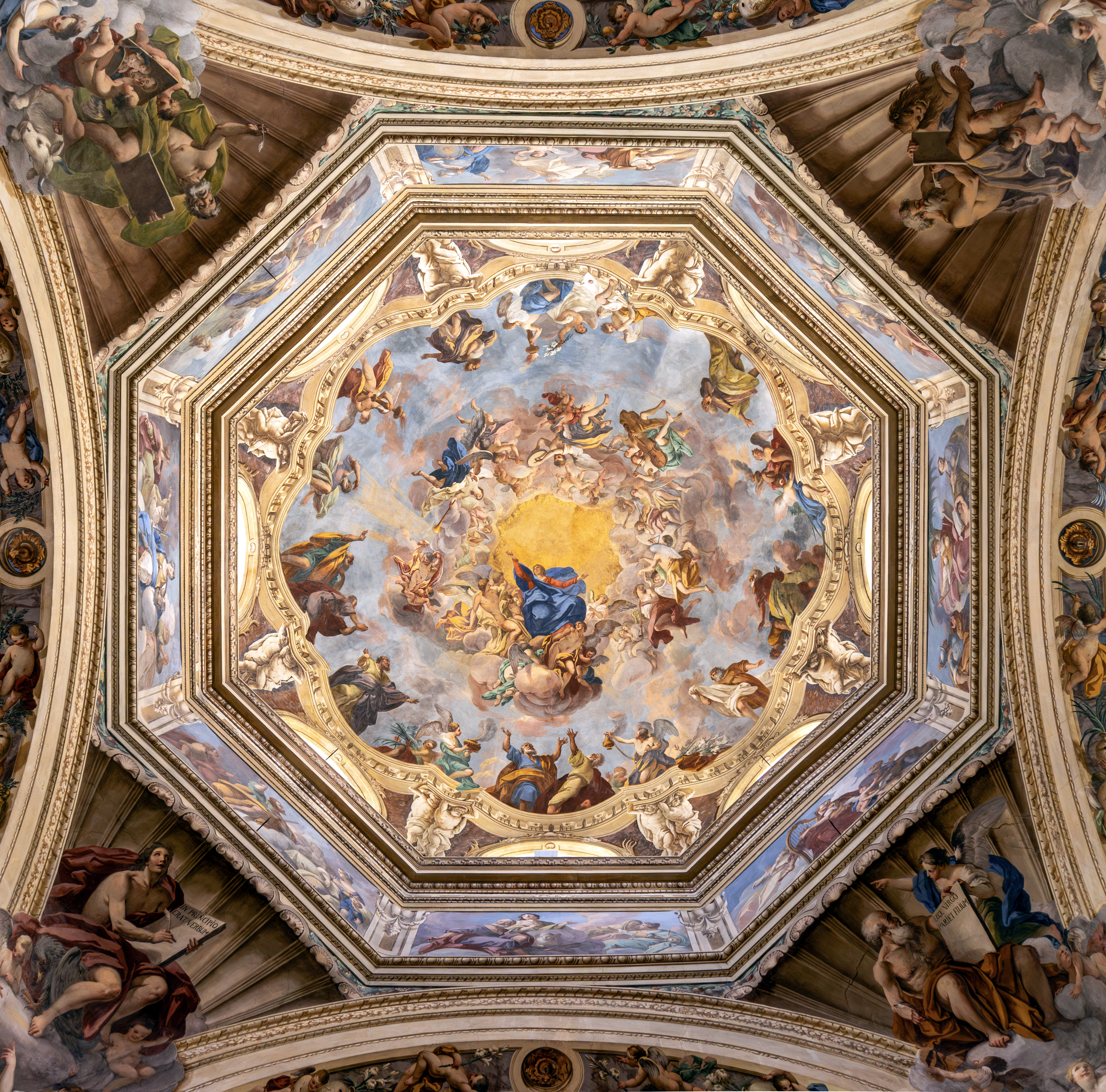
Frescos of the dome of the Abbey of St Maria del Monte.

In August 1758, Barnabas Chiaramonti, later Pope Pius VII was professed as a novice at the monastery. The earthquake of 1768 destroyed the dome of the basilica. The dome was reconstructed by Pietro Carlo Borboni and decorated by Giuseppe Milani between 1773 and 1774.

The abbey was suppressed in 1796 during the occupation of Italy by the French Revolutionary Army, under Napoleon Bonaparte. The monks were expelled and the contents of the abbey were sold off. The basilica was transferred to the care of the Conventual Franciscans until they too were suppressed in 1810, at which time it was administered by secular clergy. After the restoration of Italian rule, the abbey grounds were returned in 1814 by their current owner, Count Semprini, to Pope Pius VII, who was a native of the city. The pope re-established the abbey in 1819 and made it a part of the Congregation of Santa Giustina, part of a reform movement of monastic life which was headquartered in the Abbey of Santa Giustina in Padua.

One notable member of the community in this period was a young man who was received into the Order in 1827 under the name of Pietro Casaretto. He was later to institute a major reform of the Cassinese Congregation.

The abbey was again suppressed in 1866. The monks were not able to return to resume their lives until 1874. During World War II, the grounds were crowded with evacuees. The church sustained considerable damage from bombing.

== Ex-voto ==
The abbey is also known for housing one of Europe's richest collection of ex-votos (votive tables that date back more than five centuries) During a visit in 1986, Pope John Paul II followed this custom and left one of his own. The abbey is also known for a workshop for antique book restoration that continues to operate today.

== Sources ==
- (in Italian) Galleria di alcuni dipinti votivi dell'Abbazia
- (in Italian) Galleria di alcune opera d'arte presenti nell'Abbazia
- (in Italian) Abbazia di Santa Maria del Monte
