= Cristoforo Serra =

Italian painter (1600–1689)

Cristoforo Serra (1600–1689) was an Italian painter of the Baroque period, active in Cesena.

Born in Cesena, Serra is exceptional in that painting was not his full-time vocation, yet he was prolific. He was a militia captain in the Papal troops and only painted "for his own enjoyment". He stayed in Rome in 1623, where he was exposed to the works of Caravaggio and his followers. His paintings can be seen in the Pinacoteca of Cesena, and the art gallery of the Foundation of Cesena Saving Bank. The painter Cristoforo Savolini was one of his pupils.

He painted a Last Supper in the convent of the Capuchins and a Lucrezia in the art gallery of the Foundation of Cesena Saving Bank.

== Sources ==
- biography
