= Cesena =

Cesena Cisêna (Romagnol)
- Comune
- Comune di Cesena
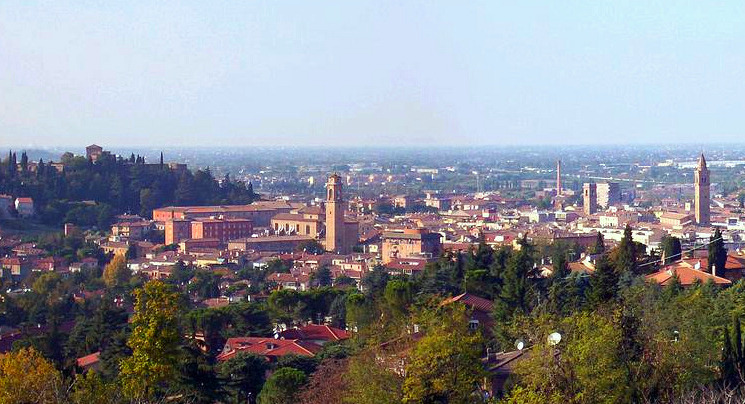
- View of Cesena

- Flag Coat of arms

- Location within Italy Location within Emilia-Romagna
- Coordinates: 44°08′20″N 12°14′40″E
- Country: Italy
- Region: Emilia-Romagna
- Province: Forlì-Cesena (FC)
- Frazioni: see list

Government
  - Mayor: Enzo Lattuca (PD)

Area
  - Total: 249.47 km^{2} (96.32 sq mi)
- Elevation: 44 m (144 ft)

Population (2026)
  - Total: 95,620
  - Density: 383.3/km^{2} (992.7/sq mi)
- Demonym: Cesenate
- Time zone: UTC+1 (CET)
  - Summer (DST): UTC+2 (CEST)
- Postal code: 47521–47522, 47023 (old)
- Dialing code: 0547
- Patron saint: St. John the Baptist
- Saint day: June 24
- Website: Official website

Cesena (Italian: [tʃeˈzɛːna]; Romagnol: Cisêna) is a city and comune (municipality) in the region of Emilia-Romagna in northern Italy; and, with Forlì, is the co-capital of the Province of Forlì-Cesena. Served by Autostrada A14, and located near the Apennine Mountains, about 15 kilometres (9 miles) from the Adriatic Sea. With a population of 95,620 as of 2026, it is the 10th-largest city in Emilia-Romagna and the 49th-largest in Italy.

== History ==
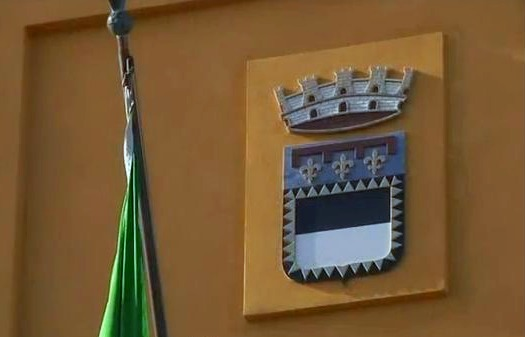
Coat of arms of Cesena on the façade of Palazzo Albornoz, the city hall

Cesena was originally an Umbrian or Etruscan town, later known as Caesena. After a brief spell under Gaulish rule, it was taken over by Romans in the 3rd century BC. It was a garrison town of strategic importance which was destroyed in the wars between Gaius Marius and Sulla. Pliny mentions the wines of Cesena as among the best.

Cesena was on the border that the Exarchate of Ravenna shared with the Lombards. It was presented to the Papacy by its Frankish conqueror in 754 (Donation of Pepin) and passed back and forth between the popes and the archbishops of Ravenna; it was also briefly a communal republic (1183–1198). It was then long contested between popes and Holy Roman Emperors. The brief rule by the Forlivese Ordelaffi was crushed in 1357 by Papal troops led by Cardinal Gil de Albornoz, after a long siege heroically endured by Cia degli Ordelaffi, wife of the Lord of Forlì.

The little comune revolted again in 1377 during the War of the Eight Saints. This time it was recaptured by Breton troops of Giovanni Acuto (the English-born condottiere John Hawkwood) under the command of Robert, Cardinal of Geneva (later antipope Clement VII). The latter, acting as the legate of Pope Gregory XI, directed the savage murder of between 2,500 and 5,000 civilians. By the laws of war at the time, this was regarded as an atrocity, called the "Cesena Bloodbath", and Cardinal Robert was dubbed the "butcher of Cesena". The following year what remained of Cesena was assigned by the new Pope Urban VII to Galeotto I Malatesta.

During the period 1379–1465, the city recovered and prospered under the Malatesta, who rebuilt the castle (called Rocca Malatestiana) overlooking the town. The Malatestiana Library, built by near the castle by Malatesta Novello (1429), is considered a fine example of a Renaissance library and holds many valuable manuscripts.

After Novello's death (1465), Cesena returned to the Papal States, but was again seized by Cesare Borgia in 1500. The city was elevated to capital of his powerful though short-lived duchy.

Cesena subsequently turned into a secondary city of the Papal States. In the 18th and 19th centuries Pope Pius VI and Pope Pius VII were born in the city, which also had Pope Pius VIII as bishop, gaining Cesena the title of "city of the three popes". During the Napoleonic Wars, it was stripped of numerous monasteries and churches. Some of its citizens had notable roles in the unification of Italy, in the second half of the 19th century.

During World War II, Cesena was near the Gothic Line, which ran along the Appennini near the city, and suffered heavily from bombing.

In 1992, it was elevated to the rank of co-capital of the province, together with Forlì.

On July 30, 2015, 1,000 people gathered at the Parco Ippodromo park in Cesena and performed "Learn to Fly" by the Foo Fighters to convince the band to perform there. The group, later known as the Rockin' 1000, was organized by Foo Fighters fans who played the guitar, bass, and drums in unison to a conductor. Dave Grohl responded with a video where he announced in Italian that the band would visit Cesena and perform there. The show was scheduled for November 3, 2015, at the town's indoor sports arena and concert venue, Carisport, becoming the kickoff date for their European tour.

== Climate ==
Climate data for Cesena (1991–2020)
Month	Jan	Feb	Mar	Apr	May	Jun	Jul	Aug	Sep	Oct	Nov	Dec	Year
Mean daily maximum °C (°F)	8.5 (47.3)	11.0 (51.8)	15.2 (59.4)	19.0 (66.2)	23.9 (75.0)	28.6 (83.5)	31.1 (88.0)	31.0 (87.8)	25.9 (78.6)	20.4 (68.7)	14.0 (57.2)	9.1 (48.4)	19.8 (67.7)
Daily mean °C (°F)	5.2 (41.4)	6.9 (44.4)	10.9 (51.6)	14.5 (58.1)	19.2 (66.6)	23.6 (74.5)	26.1 (79.0)	25.9 (78.6)	21.2 (70.2)	16.4 (61.5)	10.7 (51.3)	5.9 (42.6)	15.5 (60.0)
Mean daily minimum °C (°F)	1.9 (35.4)	2.9 (37.2)	6.6 (43.9)	10.0 (50.0)	14.4 (57.9)	18.7 (65.7)	21.0 (69.8)	20.8 (69.4)	16.5 (61.7)	12.4 (54.3)	7.5 (45.5)	2.8 (37.0)	11.3 (52.3)
Average precipitation mm (inches)	43.1 (1.70)	55.7 (2.19)	58.6 (2.31)	64.3 (2.53)	64.4 (2.54)	49.1 (1.93)	34.4 (1.35)	51.7 (2.04)	74.6 (2.94)	78.7 (3.10)	83.3 (3.28)	62.8 (2.47)	720.7 (28.38)
Average precipitation days (≥ 1.0 mm)	6	6	7	8	7	5	4	4	7	8	9	8	79
Source 1: Arpae Emilia-Romagna
Source 2: Climi e viaggi (preciptiation days)

== Demographics ==
Historical population
Year	Pop.	±%
1861	36,269	—
1871	38,528	+6.2%
1881	40,873	+6.1%
1901	45,308	+10.9%
1911	49,197	+8.6%
1921	53,949	+9.7%
1931	60,791	+12.7%
1936	61,167	+0.6%
1951	70,386	+15.1%
1961	79,700	+13.2%
1971	86,580	+8.6%
1981	89,451	+3.3%
1991	88,483	−1.1%
2001	90,948	+2.8%
2011	95,990	+5.5%
2021	96,168	+0.2%
Source: ISTAT

As of 2026, the population is 95,620, of which 48.6% are males, and 51.4% are females. Minors make up 13.7% of the population, and seniors make up 26.9%.

=== Immigration ===
As of 2025, immigrants make up 12.8% of the population. The 5 largest foreign countries of birth are Albania, Romania, Morocco, Ukraine, and Bangladesh.

Foreign-born population (2025)
Country of birth	Population
Albania	1,418
Romania	1,299
Morocco	955
Ukraine	745
Bangladesh	567
Bulgaria	548
Switzerland	520
Senegal	462
Tunisia	447
Poland	420
Nigeria	418
Moldova	401
China	295
Germany	212
Algeria	197

== Sights ==
Cesena's monuments include:

- Abbey of St Maria del Monte
- Malatestian Fortress (Rocca Malatestiana): begun by Cardinal Albornoz in 1380 on the site of an earlier building that hosted Frederick Barbarossa and Frederick II. Completed by Papal governor Lorenzo Zane in 1480, it was later used by Cesare Borgia to imprison Caterina Sforza. The fortress is octagonal with two main towers: the taller maschio ("male") and the shorter foemina ("female").
- Piazza del Popolo
- Malatestiana Library — the first public library in Europe and a UNESCO Memory of the World site.
- Cathedral of Saint John the Baptist
- Pinacoteca Comunale, housed in a former Benedictine monastery.
- Art collection of Fondazione Cassa di Risparmio di Cesena, located in the former Celestine monastery.
- Teatro Alessandro Bonci
- Palazzo Ghini
- Church of Sant'Agostino
- Church and Convent dell'Osservanza
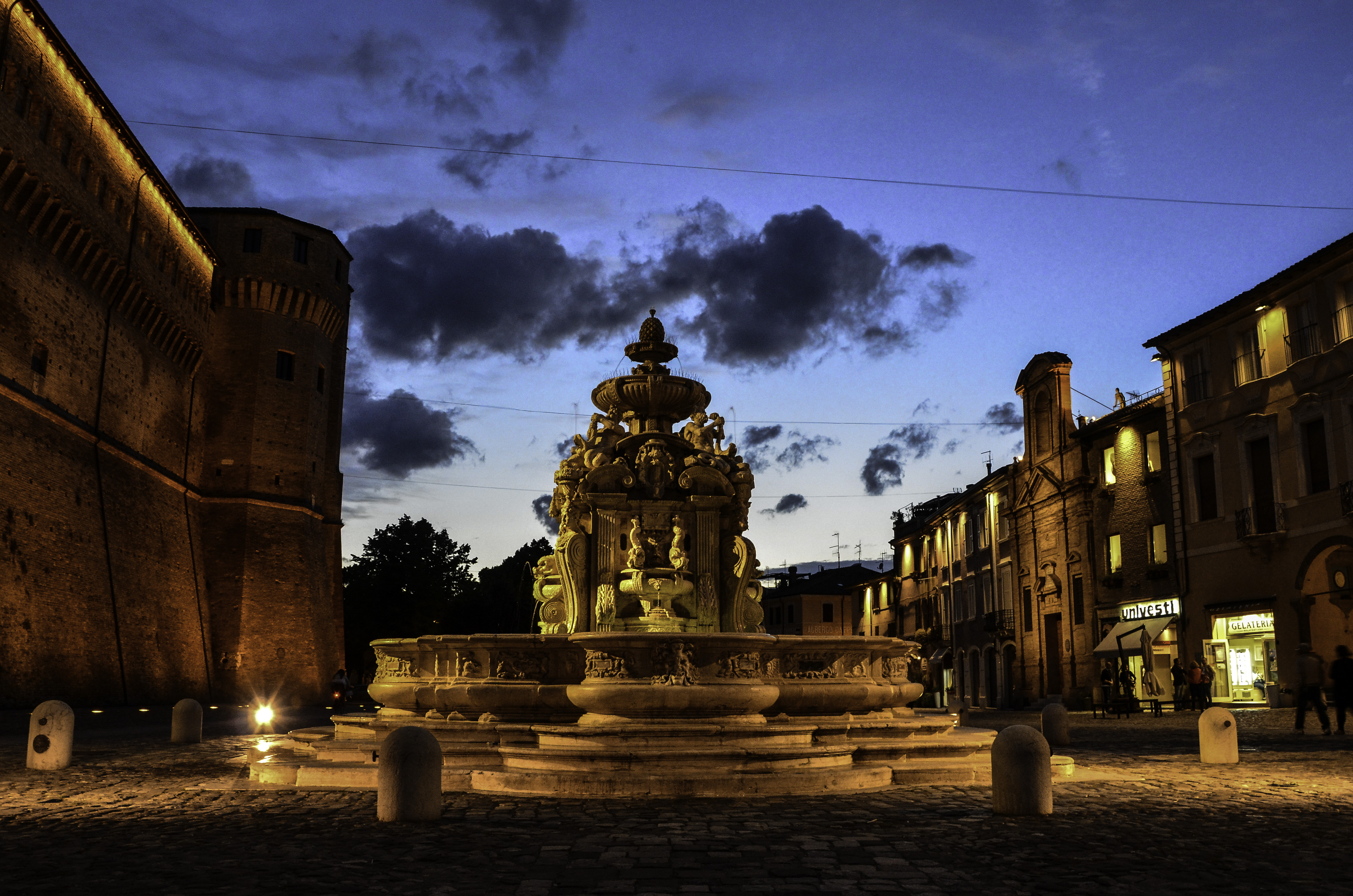
Piazza del Popolo in Cesena

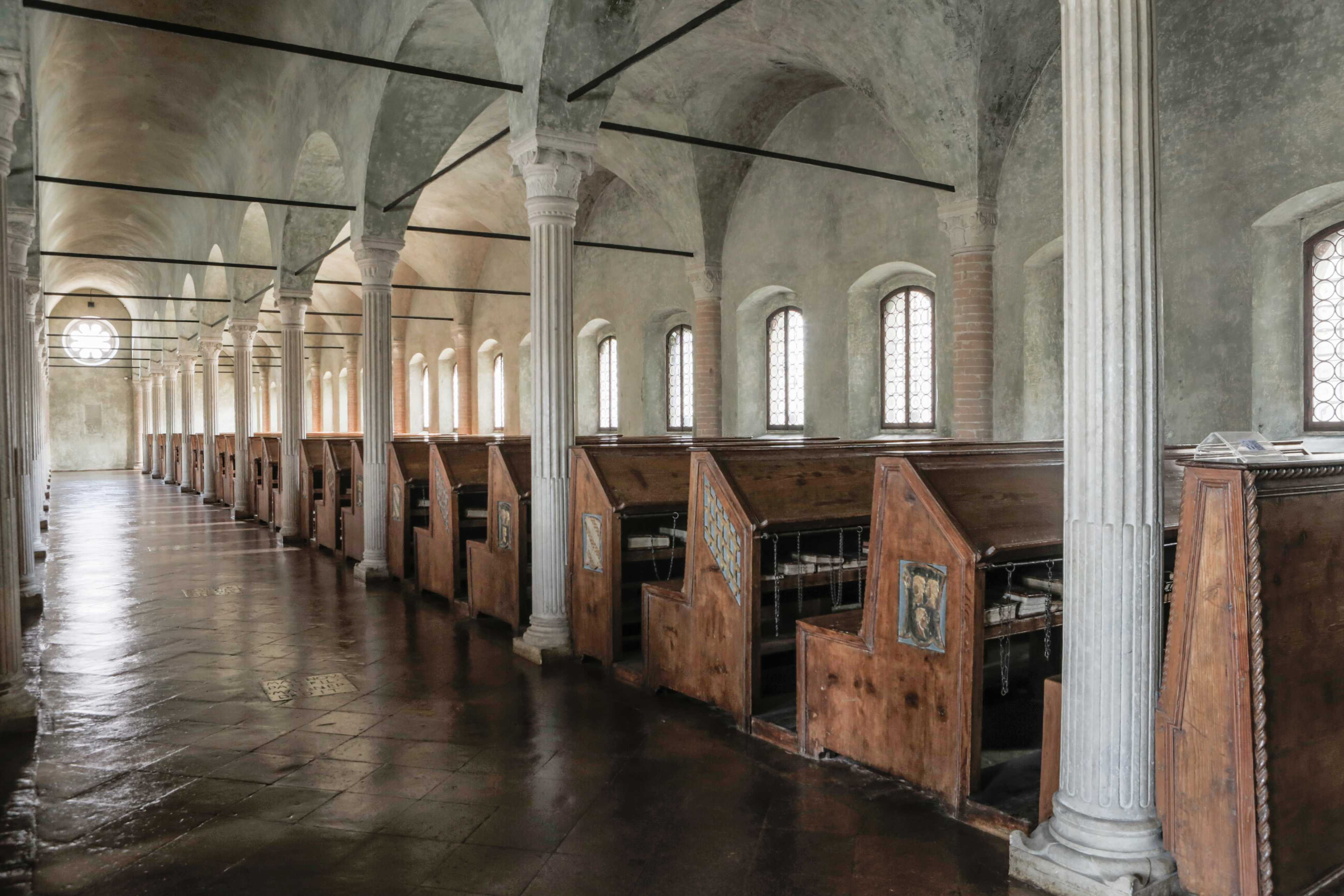
The Biblioteca Malatestiana

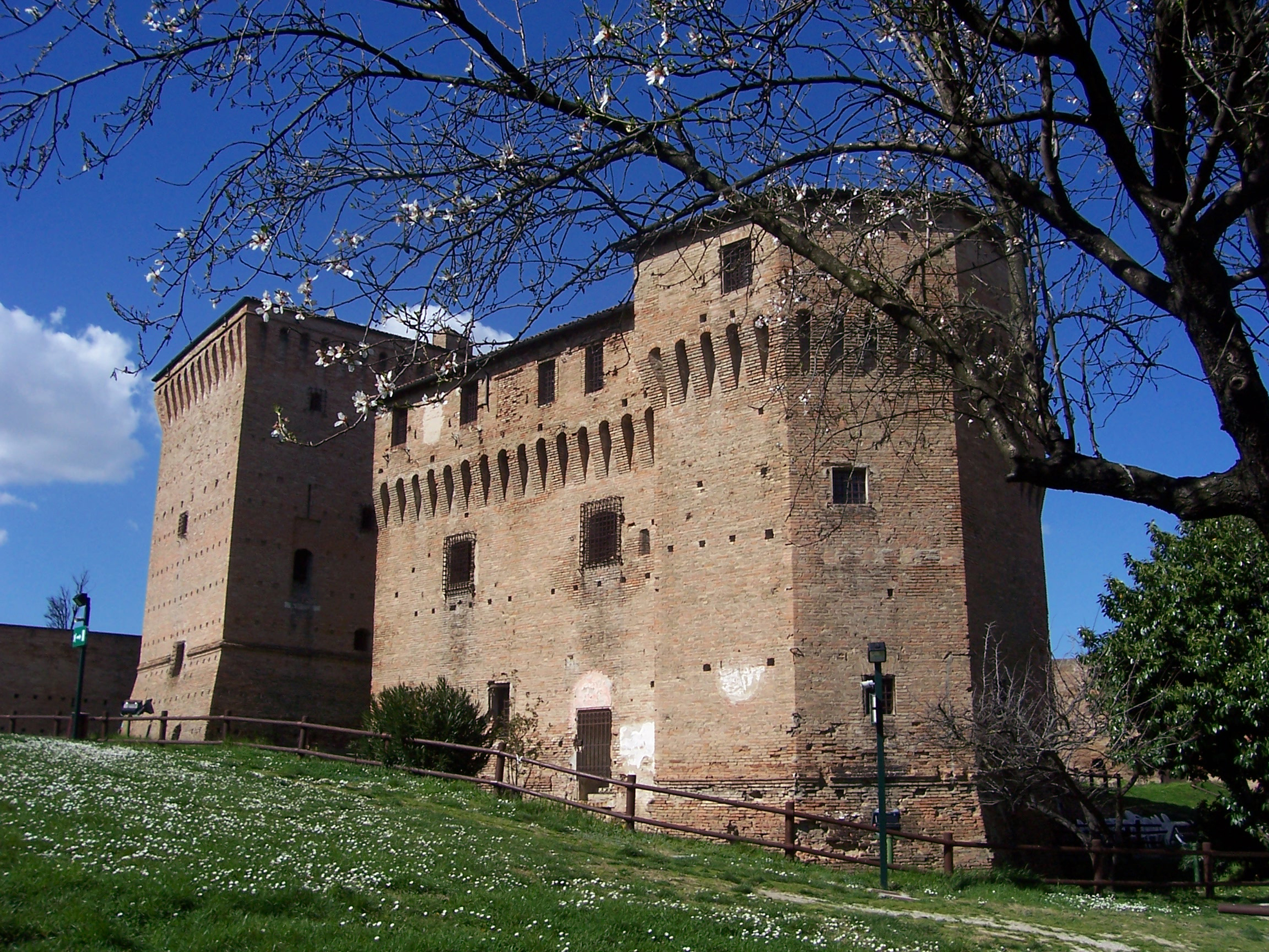
The towers of the Rocca Malatestiana in Cesena

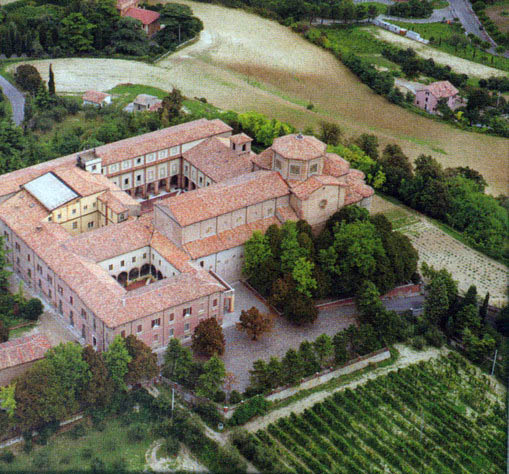
The Abbey of St Maria del Monte

== Economy ==
The main economic sectors in Cesena are:

- agriculture, in particular fruit and vegetables, and food processing
- manufacturing, in particular mechanics, agricultural and industrial equipment, construction equipment
- in the tertiary sector, banking and tourism.

Notable companies based in Cesena include:

- Technogym (fitness equipment)
- Soilmec (construction equipment)
- Olidata (computers)
- Cassa di Risparmio di Cesena (banking)

== Transport ==
Cesena railway station, opened in 1861, forms part of the Bologna–Ancona railway. It is situated at Piazza Giorgio Sanguinetti, to the northeast of the city centre. The nearest airports are Federico Fellini International Airport, located 39 km (24 mi) south east and Bologna Guglielmo Marconi Airport, located 94 km (58 mi) north west of Cesena.

== Notable people ==
- Monty Banks [Mario Bianchi] (1897–1950), Italian-born American actor, comedian and director
- Christoph Babbi (1748–1814), violinist, composer, and concertmaster of the Dresden court
- Gregorio Babbi (1708–1768), operatic tenor
- Alessandro Bonci (1870–1940), operatic tenor
- Nicoletta Braschi (born 1960), Italian actress, best known for her work with her husband, actor and director Roberto Benigni
- Vincenzo Negrini (1804–1840), bass-baritone opera singer
- Marco Pantani (1970–2004), road cyclist
- Michael of Cesena (c. 1270–1342), Minister General of the Franciscans from 1316 to his deposition in 1329
- Pope Pius VI (1717–1799), pope from February 15, 1775, to August 29, 1799
- Pope Pius VII (1742–1823), pope from March 14, 1800, to August 20, 1823
- Scipione Chiaramonti (1565–1652), philosopher and opponent of Galileo
- Lorenzo Savadori (born 1993), motorcycle racer
- Obadiah ben Jacob Sforno, rabbi
- Alberto Sughi (1928–2012), Italian painter
- Lamberto Tacoli (1964), entrepreneur
- Giuseppe Palmas (1918–1977), photographer
- Carlo Domeniconi (born 1947), guitarist and composer
- Nicky Hayden (1981–2017), Moto GP and Superbike pilot who died in Cesena on the 22nd March 2017
- Maurizio Ferrini (born 1953), comedian and actor
- Ubaldo Comandini (1869–1925), mayor and cabinet minister
- Federico Comandini, (1893–1967), politician
- Andrea Navarra (born 1971), rally driver
- Romeo Castellucci (born 1960), director and set designer

== See also ==
- Roman Catholic Diocese of Cesena-Sarsina
- Palazzo Ghini
