= Koda River =

Koda River may be:

- Koda River, the Japanese name of the Hutuo River (China) in the Linji school of Buddhism
- Koda River (D. R. Congo), also spelled Kodda or Kodha, in Ituri province
- Kōda River (Aichi), Japan; also called Kōta like the town
- Kōda River (Kōchi), Japan
- Koda River (Russia), a tributary of the Angara, NE of Kodinsk
- Koda River (South Sudan), in Jubek State

== See also ==
- Koda (disambiguation)
