= Coda =

Coda or CODA may refer to:

== Arts, entertainment, and media ==
=== Films ===
- Movie coda, a post-credits scene
- Coda (1987 film), an Australian horror film about a serial killer, made for television
- Coda, a 2017 American experimental film from Nathaniel Dorsky's Arboretum Cycle
- Ryuichi Sakamoto: Coda, a documentary film about the life of composer Ryuichi Sakamoto
- Coda (2019 film), a Canadian drama film starring Patrick Stewart, Katie Holmes, and Giancarlo Esposito
- CODA (2021 film), an American drama film featuring a child of deaf adults

=== Music ===
- Coda (music), a passage that brings a movement or piece to a conclusion through prolongation
- Coda (Led Zeppelin album), 1982
- Coda (SMP album), 2010
- Coda, a 1983 album by Ryuichi Sakamoto
- Coda (Australian band)
- Coda (Mexican band)
- "Coda", a song by God Is an Astronaut from the album The End of the Beginning
- "Coda", a song by Riverside from the album Shrine of New Generation Slaves
- "#010126 Coda", a song by Latvian artist Tikasha Sakama, finalist in selection for Latvia in the Eurovision Song Contest 2026
- "Coda: A Burn Scar in the Shape of the Sooner State", a song by Los Campesinos! from the album Romance is Boring

=== Television ===
- "Coda" (Criminal Minds), a 2011 episode
- "Coda" (Dawson's Creek), a 2001 episode
- "Coda" (Endeavour), a 2016 episode
- "Coda" (Star Trek: Voyager), a 1997 episode
- "Coda" (The Walking Dead), a 2014 episode

=== Other uses in arts, entertainment, and media ===
- Coda (ballet), the final dance in a grand pas
- Coda, a group of female warriors in Wildcats (comics)
- Coda (comics), 2018 comic book series
- Coda (magazine), a Canadian jazz magazine published from 1958 to 2009
- Coda (novel), a 1994 novel by Thea Astley
- Coda Media, a news website
- CODA System, a role-playing game system

== Computing and technology ==
- Coda (file system), a network file system
- Coda (web development software), a web development application
- CODA Content Delivery Architecture
- Coda.io, a cloud-based document editor
- CEBAF On-line Data Acquisition, a system used at Jefferson Lab in the United States
- Component detection algorithm, an algorithm in mass spectrometry

== Organizations and enterprises ==
- CODA (company), financial software specialist now owned by UNIT4
- Calgary Olympic Development Association, the former name of the Canadian Winter Sport Institute, a non-profit organization
- Co-Dependents Anonymous (CoDA), a twelve-step program
- Coda Automotive, an electric motor vehicle company headquartered in Southern California, US
  - Coda (electric car), an all-electric car manufactured by Coda Automotive
- Coordinadora de Organizaciones de Defensa Ambiental, a coalition of Spanish environmental groups
- Content Overseas Distribution Association, a trade association for international distribution of Japanese content

== Other uses ==
- Syllabic coda, (linguistics) the final consonant(s) of a syllable
- Child of deaf adult (or CODA), a hearing person who was raised by a deaf parent or guardian
- CODA (mixed-use development), Midtown Atlanta, US
- Coda (surname)
- Coda alla vaccinara, an Italian stew using oxtail
- Cognitive discourse analysis, a research method that examines natural language data to gain insights into patterns in thought

== See also ==
- Caudate sonnet, an expanded version of the sonnet
- Koda (disambiguation)
- Cauda (disambiguation)
- The Dust Coda, an English band
- Acoda, an English band
