= Koda =

Koda or KODA may refer to:

== People ==
- Cub Koda (1948–2000), American rock and roll songwriter, singer, guitarist, disc jockey, music critic and record compiler
- Geeta Koda (born ca. 1983), Indian politician
- Gjon Koda (born 1893), Albanian friar, one of the 38 Blessed Martyrs of Albania
- Harold Koda (born 1950), American fashion scholar
- Madhu Koda (born 1971), Indian Chief Minister of the State of Jharkhand
- Kōda, often spelled Koda or Kouda, a common Japanese surname
  - Aya Kōda (1904–1990), Japanese essayist and novelist
  - Gakuto Coda (born 1977), Japanese light novelist
  - Isao Koda (born 1965), Japanese baseball pitcher
  - Hiroyuki Koda (1944–1997), director of the US Yoshukai Karate Association 1979–1997
  - Kaho Kōda (born 1967), Japanese voice actress
  - Koda Kumi (born 1982), Japanese pop singer
  - Kuniko Koda (born 1965), Japanese politician
  - Kōda Rohan, pen name of Japanese author Kōda Shigeyuki (1867–1947)
  - Masakazu Koda (born 1969), Japanese soccer player
  - Mariko Kouda (born 1969), Japanese voice actress and J-Pop singer
  - Naoko Kouda, stage name of Japanese voice actress Yumiko Satō (born 1959)
  - Nobu Kōda (1870–1946), Japanese composer, violinist, and music teacher
  - Shosei Koda (1979–2004), Japanese tourist who was beheaded in Iraq
  - Kōda, fictional family in the Manpuku Japanese TV drama series (2018–)
- Koda Glover (born 1993), American baseball pitcher
- Koda Martin (born 1995), American football player
- KODA (singer) (full name Kofi Owusu Dua Anto, 1978–2024), Ghanaian gospel singer

== Places ==
- Kōda Station (disambiguation), three train stations in Japan
- Koda Dam, in Miyagi Prefecture, Japan
- Kōda, former Japanese town, merged into Akitakata, Hiroshima in 2004
- Kōda, former Japanese town, merged into Kōta, Aichi in 1955
- Koda, or Koda-cho, a district (cho) of Tahara, Aichi Japan
- Koda River, the Japanese name of the Hutuo River (China), in the Linji school of Buddhism
- Koda River (D. R. Congo), also spelled Kodda or Kodha, in Ituri province
- Kōda River (Aichi), Japan; also called Kōta like the town
- Kōda River (Kōchi), Japan; "Kanda" in some English sources
- Koda (Russia), a tributary of the Angara in Krasnoyarsk Krai, Russia
- Koda River (South Sudan), in Jubek State
- Koda, a hamlet and part of Tetín (Beroun District), Czech Republic

== Other uses ==
- KODA, an FM radio station in Houston, Texas, United States
- KODA, prefix of the KLAT AM radio station in Houston, Texas, until 1979
- KODA (Denmark), the collecting society for songwriters, composers and music publishers of Denmark
- KODA (Kid Of Deaf Adult), an acronym sometimes used to refer to a Child Of Deaf Adult (CODA) under the age of 18
- Koda, a character in the Disney Brother Bear movies.
- Koda (Power Rangers Dino Charge), a character in the television series Power Rangers Dino Charge
- Koda Farms, a family-owned rice producer in California
- Koda language, spoken in India and Bangladesh
- Koda millet or Kodo millet, Paspalum scrobiculatum
- Koda tree, Ehretia acuminata, from China, Japan, New Guinea and Australia
- KODA Finance, a finance company in the UK

== See also ==
- Koda Jahanabad or Kora Jahanabad, town in Fatehpur district, Uttar Pradesh, India
- Maavalla Koda, a religious organization in Estonia
- Thumbida Koda, a 1964 Kannada language film from India
- Choda (also known as Koda), an ancient Indian tribal group
- Skoda Auto, a Czech automaker sometimes misspelled as "Koda"
- Coda (disambiguation)
- Alternative transliterations of "Koda" for place names in India:
  - Kora (disambiguation)
  - Korha (disambiguation)
  - Korra (disambiguation)
  - Khori (disambiguation)
  - Khora
