= Stalemate (disambiguation) =

A stalemate in chess occurs when the player whose turn it is to move is not in check but has no legal move, resulting in the game being a draw.

Stalemate may also refer to:

- Draw (tie), a result in competitions where there is either no winner or multiple winners
- Impasse, in bargaining
- Political stalemate, when competing political forces prevent each other from acting
- Operation Stalemate, Battle of Peleliu in 1944 in the Pacific Theater of World War II

== Music ==
- Stalemate (Fela Kuti album), 1977
- Stalemate (SMP album), 1995
- Stalemate (EP), a 1994 EP by SMP

=== Songs ===
- "Stalemate", by Neurosis from Pain of Mind, 1987
- "Stalemate", by Limp Bizkit from Three Dollar Bill, Y'all, 1997
- "Stalemate", by Katatonia from Discouraged Ones, 1998
- "Stalemate", by Soilwork from Stabbing the Drama, 2005
- "Stalemate" (song), by Ben's Brother, 2009
- "Stalemate", by Enter Shikari from A Flash Flood of Colour, 2012
- "Stalemate", by Io Echo from Ministry of Love, 2013
- "Stalemate", by Marc Martel from Impersonator, 2014
- "Stalemate", by Frank Wildhorn from Death Note: The Musical, 2015
- "Stalemate", by The Story So Far from The Story So Far, 2015

== Others ==
- Stalemate, a 2007 Indian English-language film starring Soumya Bollapragada

== See also ==
- Deadlock (disambiguation)
- Gridlock (disambiguation)
