= Erich Ott =

German sculptor, engraver, and designer (born 1944)

Erich Ott (born 3 December 1944 in Oberammergau, Germany) is a German sculptor, engraver, and designer.

He is best known for his design of numerous German commemorative coins and designed

- the German Deutsche Mark coins
  - in 1977, the 5 DM coin, commemorating the 200th anniversary of Carl Friedrich Gauss.
  - in 1981, the 5 DM coin, commemorating the 150th anniversary of the death of Heinrich Friedrich Karl vom und zum Stein.
  - in 1985, the 5 DM coin, commemorating the 150th anniversary of first railroad in Germany.
  - in 1990, the back of the commemorative 2 Deutsche Mark coin dedicated to Franz-Josef Strauß, which was issued from 1990 to 2001 with more than 140 million examples.
  - in 1991, the 10 DM coin, commemorating the 200th anniversary of the Brandenburg Gate.
  - in 1993, the 10 DM coin, commemorating the 1000th anniversary of Potsdam.
  - in 2000, the 10 DM coin, commemorating the 1,200th anniversary of the Dome in Aachen.
- German commemorative Euro coins
  - in 2004, the back of the 10 euro coin to commemorate the 2006 FIFA World Cup in Germany.
  - in 2004, the 10 euro coin to commemorate the 200th anniversary of the birth of the poet Eduard Mörike
  - in 2005, the reverse of the 100 euro note in gold for the occasion of the FIFA Football World Cup 2006 in Germany.
  - in 2012, the Bavaria 2 euro coin in the series "Bundesländer" featuring Schloss Neuschwanstein
