= Coda (surname) =

Coda is a surname. Notable people with the surname include:

- Andrea Coda (born 1985), Italian footballer
- Bartolomeo Coda (1516–1565), Italian painter, son of Benedetto
- Benedetto Coda (1492–1535), Italian painter
- Brianna Coda (born 2001), American wrestler performing as Cora Jade and Elayna Black
- Gakuto Coda (born 1977), Japanese novelist
- Giorgio Coda (1924–1988), Italian psychiatrist and academic
- Giovanni Coda (born 1964), Italian film director and photographer
- John Coda, American composer of film and television music
- Massimo Coda (born 1988), Italian footballer
