= Hacked Vol. 2 =

Remix album by SMP
- Released: May 9, 2016
- Genre: Industrial rock
- Length: 90:41
- Label: Music Ration Entertainment

SMP chronology
Death of the Format (2013)	Hacked Vol. 2 (2016)

Hacked Vol. 2 is a remix album by SMP, released on May 9, 2016 by Music Ration Entertainment. The collection comprises eight previously unreleased remixes, one out-of-print remix, three instrumentals and nine remixes that appeared on the band's 2002 album Hacked.

== Track listing ==
No.	Title	Remixer(s)	Length
1.	"Policy" (Doll Factory Mix)	Doll Factory	4:15
2.	"Megaton" (Doll Factory Mix)	Doll Factory	4:39
3.	"Chemicals" (Mindless Faith Mix)	Mindless Faith	4:59
4.	"Mutate" (Hyperkinetik Mix)	Hyperkinetik	4:11
5.	"Chemicals" (Mindless Faith Mix)	Mindless Faith	4:33
6.	"Policy" (Flesh Field Mix)	Flesh Field	3:19
7.	"Finished" (Battery Cage Mix)	Battery Cage	4:38
8.	"Chemicals" (Doll Factory Mix)	Doll Factory	4:15
9.	"Mutate" (Comacast/Vers Mix)	Comacast/Vers Mix	4:54
10.	"September" (Med Lab Mix)	Med Lab	4:57
11.	"Policy" (Subgun Mix)	Subgun	4:23
12.	"Finished" (Dataphantastiq Mix)	Dataphantastiq	4:27
13.	"Mutate" (Doll Factory Mix)	Doll Factory	3:59
14.	"Megaton" (Thine Eyes Mix)	Thine Eyes	3:49
15.	"Mutate" (Any Questions? Mix)	Any Questions?	3:15
16.	"September" (Dataphantastiq Mix)	Dataphantastiq	4:09
17.	"Policy" (Codec Mix)	Codec	5:14
18.	"Finished" (Undergod Mix)	Undergod	3:24
19.	"Mutate" (Hyperkinetik Instrumental Mix)	Hyperkinetik	4:26
20.	"Finished" (Battery Cage Instrumental Mix)	Battery Cage	4:41
21.	"Megaton" (Thine Eyes Instrumental Mix)	Thine Eyes	4:14

== Personnel ==
Adapted from the Hacked Vol. 2 liner notes.

SMP

- Jason Bazinet – lead vocals, instruments
- Sean Ivy – lead vocals, instruments

Production and design

- Bethany Antikajian – backing vocals (13), Jeremy Moss (5, 10, 16)
- Steph Dumais – design
- Heather Ivy – cover art, illustrations
- The Sultan – design

== Release history ==
Region	Date	Label	Format	Catalog
United States	2016	Music Ration Entertainment	DL	
