= Antikajian =

Antikajian is a surname. Notable people with the surname include:

- Garrick Antikajian, member of American band Doll Factory
