= Crimes of the Future =

- Crimes of the Future (1970 film), a 1970 film directed by David Cronenberg
- Crimes of the Future (2022 film), a 2022 film directed by David Cronenberg
- Crimes of the Future (album), a 2004 album by American musical group SMP
