= Hetsch =

Hetsch is a surname of German origin. It may refer to the following people:

- Gustav Friedrich Hetsch (1788–1864), German architect
- Heinrich Hetsch (1873–1947), German physician
- Ludwig Hetsch (1806–1872), German composer
- Philipp Friedrich von Hetsch (1758–1839), German painter
