= Fritz Kauffmann =

German composer (1855–1934)

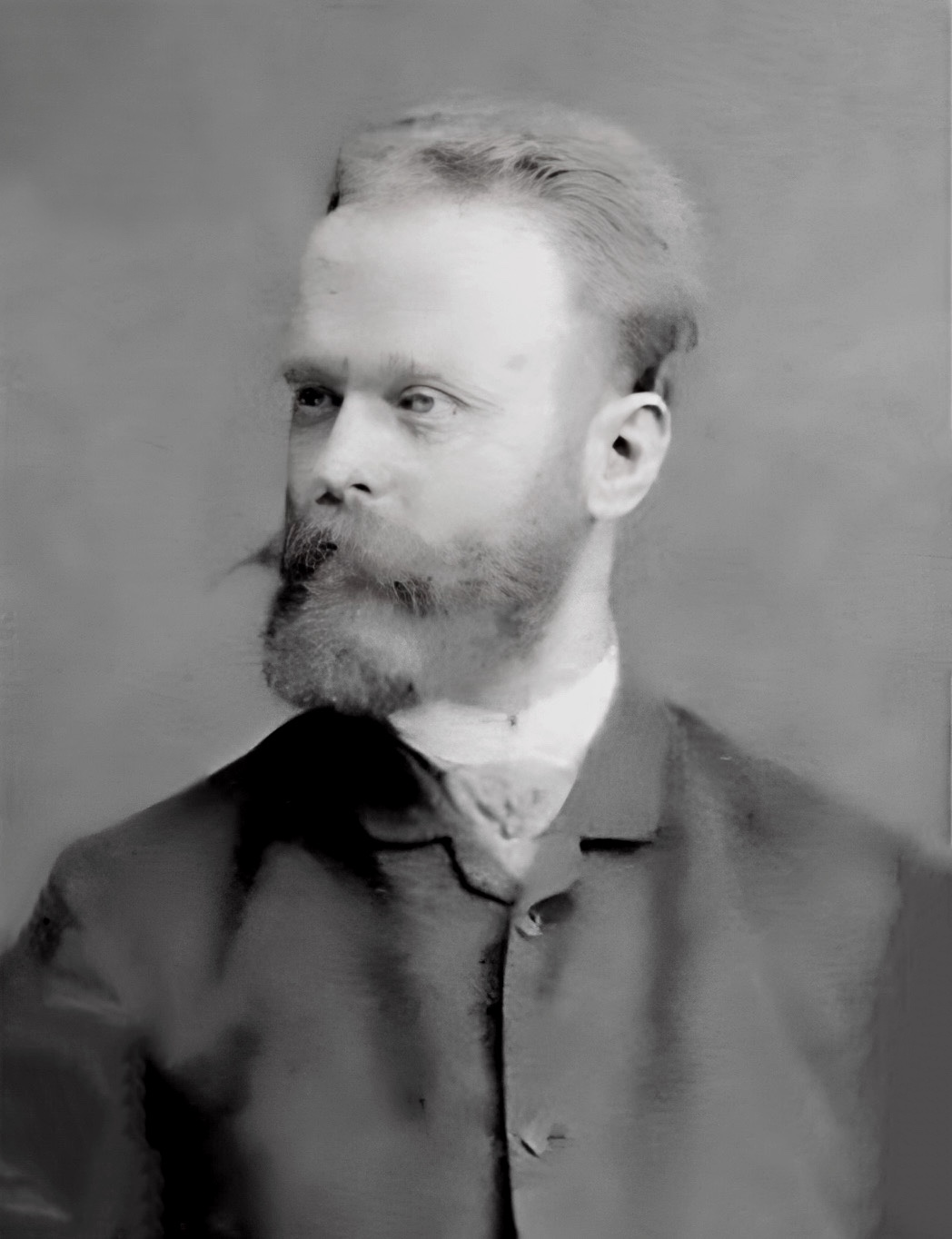
Portrait photograph, 1886.

Fritz Kauffmann (Berlin, 17 June 1855 – Magdeburg, 29 September 1934) was a German composer and conductor.

== Biography ==
Kauffmann was born in Berlin as the son of the pharmaceutical industrialist Julius Kauffmann, and initially studied there with Hermann Mohr. After completing an apprenticeship as a pharmacist in Hamburg and studying chemistry at the University of Leipzig, he enrolled in the Akademische Hochschule für Musik in Berlin, where he was a pupil of Friedrich Kiel (composition) and Ernst Rudorff (piano). When he went to Vienna as a Mendelssohn scholarship holder in 1881, Johannes Brahms took an interest in him. After returning to Berlin, Kauffmann initially worked as a private music teacher.

In 1889 he moved to Magdeburg to conduct the Gesellschaftskonzerte (rechristened "City Symphony Concerts" in 1897). In 1897 he also took on the management of the Rebling Church Choir, which carried out the large oratorio concerts in the city. In addition, Kauffmann worked privately as a piano and theory teacher, and from 1923 also at the seminar of the composers' union. Kauffmann was appointed Royal Music Director in 1893 and professor in 1909. A board member of the German Music Education Association, in 1923 he took over the chairmanship of the Magdeburg Music Education Association. Kauffmann worked energetically to establish the municipal orchestra as a professional ensemble with permanent positions for the musicians.

In 1920 he resigned from the Church Choir; ten years later he retired from professional musical life altogether but remained in Magdeburg, where he died in 1934, age 79.

== Composition ==
Kauffmann composed music in a wide variety of genres. During his life, these compositions received their share of recognition, as this review of his first violin concerto demonstrates:

For those who are tired of the eternal repetition of the Mendelssohn and Bruch G minor violin concertos, and their number, beautiful as these two works are, is legion, Felix Berber's first concert this season brought a novelty which they will hail with pleasure. The fiery, young, handsome, and talented Magdeburg concertmaster last Friday night at the Singakademie played to a good sized and friendly audience for the first time a new violin concerto, yet in manuscript, by Kauffmann the musikdirector of Magdeburg. The composer conducted his work in person, and with the executant shared the applause of the public, though not unanimously that of the press. The score was in my hands some six or eight weeks ago, and upon only cursory examination I found it to be the work of an excellent musician. Now, after hearing the concerto, I deem it an important augmentation to the not-overburdened violin literature of the concerto genre. Kauffmann is already favorably known through his symphony and his piano concerto, but his op. 27, the D minor violin concerto will do more for him in this respect than both these preceding works. So much I am prone to predict. The first movement, though a trifle too long drawn out and a little rambling generally, is of considerable musical importance, finely conceived and masterly carried out, both as to the treatment of the solo instrument and the symphonic mold, which also permeates the orchestral accompaniment. The slow movement in B major is a lovely romanza, with a beautiful cantilene theme and an ethereal Tristan ending, while the last movement is fresh and unflagging. The second theme in A major especially is very taking. The solo part of course is extremely difficult, but in the hands of a technically so skilled and musically so gifted artist as Felix Berber, it is a work worth hearing. I recommend it to the attention of Mr. Brodski, Berber's teacher, as well as Kneisel, Miss Powell, and a very few others. Second-rate violinists, however, should not touch it.

In 1904, Kauffmann was the recipient of the Lesley Alexander Composition Prize. However, after his death in 1934 his music was mostly forgotten.

== Franke Plagiarism Case ==
In January 2024, it transpired that Kauffmann's Symphony in A minor of 1886 had been plagiarised by the German composer Hans Franke (1886–1971). The fraud came to light thanks to the publication of a synthesized rendition of Kauffmann's symphony on YouTube. During the Second World War the work had received a (second) first performance by the Spa Orchestra of Teplitz-Schönau under national socialist conductor Bruno C. Schestak. The symphony was recorded in 2007 as Hans Franke's Symphony no. 6 in A minor, Op. 790 by the Brandenburg State Orchestra Frankfurt an der Oder under conductor Christian Hammer. The recognition of Kauffmann's symphony as plagiarism by Franke led to various similar identifications.

== Works (selection) ==
=== Dramatic works ===
- Die Herzkrankheit (The Lovesickness), comical opera in one act on a libretto by Julius Jost. Berlin, Carl Paez (D. Charton), 1888

=== Orchestral Music ===
- Symphony in A minor, Op. 18. Berlin, Carl Paez (D. Charton), 1886.
- Piano Concerto in C minor, Op. 25. Carl Paez (D. Charton), 1892.
- Dramatische Ouvertüre for large orchestra, Op. 23. Carl Paez (D. Charton), 1893.
- Violin Concerto in D minor, Op. 27. Carl Paez (D. Charton), 1894.
- Cello Concerto in C minor, Op. 29. Carl Paez (D. Charton), 1899.
- Violin Concerto No. 2 in A minor, Op. 50. Magdeburg, Heinrichshofen's verlag, 1909.

=== Chamber Music ===
- Piano Trio No. 1, Op. 9 (1881)
- Variations on an Original Theme for String Quartet, Op. 8 (1882)
- String Quartet in G major, Op. 14, dedicated to Johannes Brahms. Berlin, Carl Paez (D. Charton), 1888
- Piano Trio No. 2 in E♭ major, Op. 20 (1887)
- Wind Quintet in E♭ major, Op. 40. Magdeburg, Heinrichshofen's Verlag, 1905.
- Abendmusik, serenade for string quartet, Op. 51 (1910)

=== Piano Music ===
- Piano Sonata No.1 in A major, Op. 7 (1882)
- Piano Sonata No.2 in B minor, Op.11 (1883)
- Tanz-Improvisationen for Piano, Op. 16. Philadelphia: Theodore Presser, 1898.
- Wanderbilder, Six improvisations for piano, Op. 30. Carl Paez (D. Charton), 1899.

=== Songs ===
- Lieder und Gesänge, Op. 19. Berlin, Carl Paez (D. Charton), 1887.
- Aus der guten alten Zeit, three songs for soprano and chamber orchestra, Op. 21. Wilhelmshaven: Heinrichshofen's Verlag, 1888?.
- Fünf Gesänge, Op.37. Magdeburg: Heinrichshofen's Verlag, 1902.

== Recordings ==
Kauffmann's Symphony in A minor was recorded in 2007 as Hans Franke's Symphony No. 6 by the Brandenburg State Orchestra Frankfurt an der Oder under conductor Christian Hammer, albeit with the central movements swapped and some slight alterations to the coda.

In 2025 a world premiere recording of both Kauffmann Piano Trio's was released by the Mitteldeutsches Klaviertrio [Classic Produktion Osnabrück|cpo label].

In addition, increased attention for Kauffmann's oeuvre caused by the Franke case caused the creation of community-produced synthetic renditions of several of Kauffmann's orchestral works, including the Dramatische Ouvertüre, his cello concerto and the piano concerto.
