= Terminal (SMP album) =

Studio album by SMP
- Released: 2000
- Genre: Industrial rock
- Length: 73:37
- Label: A.D.S.R. Musicwerks
- Producer: Jason Bazinet, Sean Ivy

SMP chronology
Ultimatum (1998)	Terminal (2000)	Hacked (2002)

Terminal is the third studio album by SMP, released in 2000 by Catastrophe Records. A critic at Last Sigh Magazine gave the album a positive review and called it "reminiscent of early nineties raves, in that it is intensely danceable with addictive hooks and crafted lyrics."

== Track listing ==
All tracks are written by Jason Bazinet and Sean Setterberg, except "Pictures of You" by Danny Elfman.

No.	Title	Length
1.	"Last Start"	3:22
2.	"Chemicals"	4:47
3.	"Policy"	4:37
4.	"The Grid"	4:59
5.	"Pictures of You" (Oingo Boingo cover)	3:52
6.	"File 484"	4:11
7.	"Sheet Metal"	4:04
8.	"Finished"	5:18
9.	"Mothkiller"	3:46
10.	"Dirt"	3:52
11.	"September"	3:48
12.	"Fatal"	4:52
13.	"Plastic"	4:24
14.	"Mutate"	4:46
15.	"Megaton"	4:01
16.	"Anthem"	4:23
17.	"Necron 99"	4:35

== Personnel ==
Adapted from the Terminal liner notes.

SMP

- Jason Bazinet – lead vocals, production, recording, mixing
- Sean Setterberg (as Sean Ivy) – production, recording, mixing, cover art, design
- Matt Sharifi – instruments

Production and design

- Aaron Edge – design
- Chris Hanzsek – mastering
- Lance Hayes – additional musicianship
- Heather Ivy – cover art, design, photography
- Xian Di Marris – drums, design
- Jeremy Moss – additional musicianship
- Robert Sydow – engineering
- Deirdre Wehrman – photography

== Release history ==
Region	Date	Label	Format	Catalog
United States	2000	A.D.S.R. Musicwerks	CD	CTR002
United States	2002	Underground, Inc.	CD	Ui 1013
