= Wilhelm Waiblinger =

German poet (1804–1830)

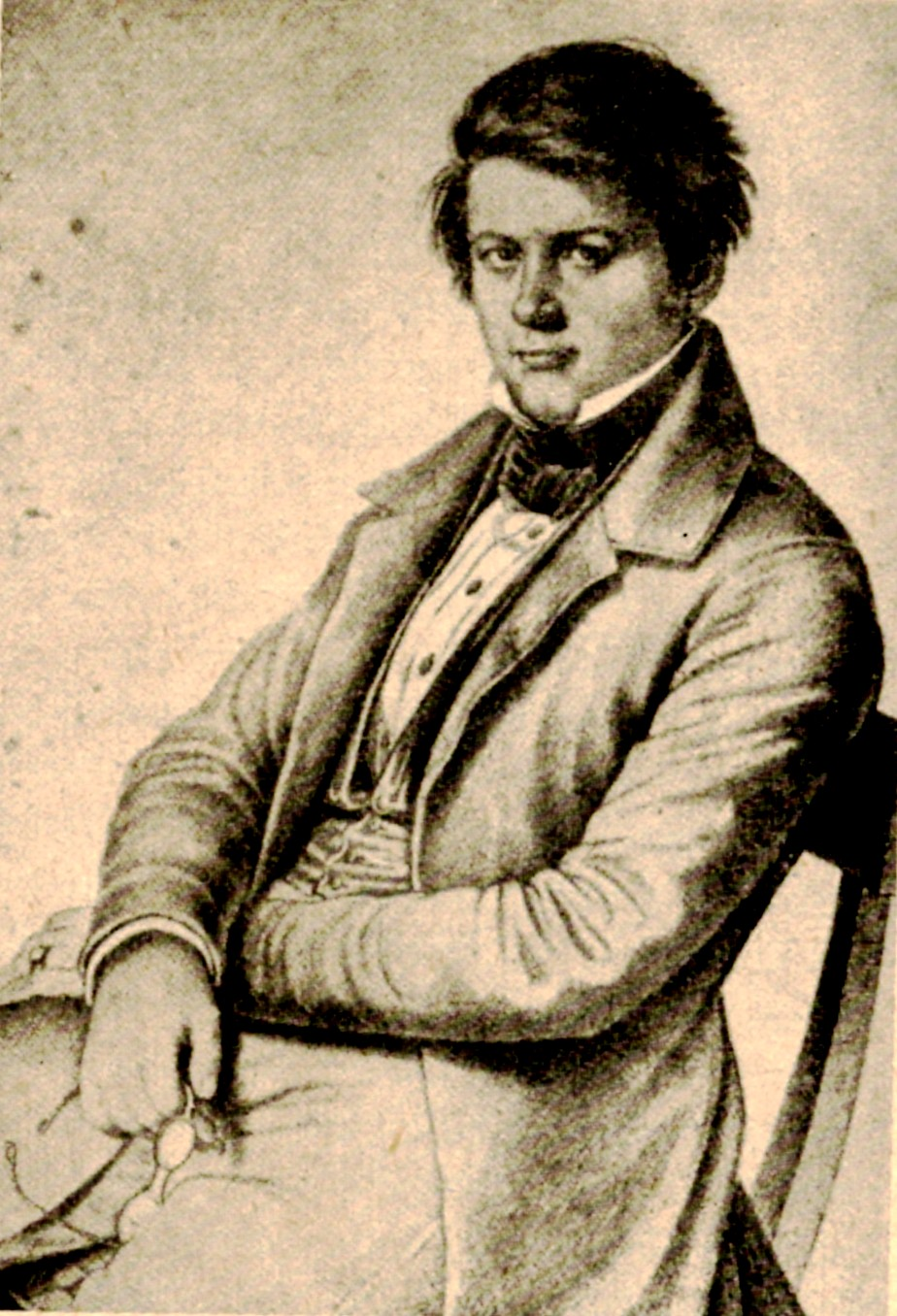
- Born: 21 November 1804; Heilbronn, Electorate of Württemberg
- Died: 17 or 30 January 1830; Rome, Papal States
- Occupation: Poet

Wilhelm Waiblinger (German: [ˈvilhɛlm ˈvaɪblɪŋɐ]; 21 November 1804 – 17 or 30 January 1830) was a German romantic poet, mostly remembered today in connection with Friedrich Hölderlin. After he had attended Gymnasium Illustre in Stuttgart, he was a student at the seminary of Tübingen in the 1820s, when Hölderlin, already mentally ill, lived there as a recluse in a carpenter's house. Waiblinger, who used to visit the older poet and take him out for walks, left an account of Hölderlin's life then, Hölderlins Leben, Dichtung und Wahnsinn ("Hölderlin's life, poetry and madness"). In the late 1820s, Waiblinger left Tübingen for Italy, dying at the age of 25 in Rome, where he is buried in the Protestant Cemetery.

In his short story "Im Presselschen Gartenhaus" ("In Pressel’s Garden-house", 1913), Hermann Hesse gives a touching picture of a visit to Hölderlin by Waiblinger and the poet Eduard Mörike, both young theology students in Tübingen, like Hölderlin himself decades before.
