= The Treatment (SMP album) =

Studio album by SMP
- Released: September 13, 2007
- Genre: Industrial rock
- Length: 41:34
- Label: Music Ration Entertainment
- Producer: Wade Alin

SMP chronology
Crimes of the Future (2004)	The Treatment (2007)	Pissing on the Legacy (2008)

The Treatment is the fifth studio album by SMP, released on September 13, 2007, by Music Ration Entertainment.

== Track listing ==
All tracks are written by Jason Bazinet, except "Who Is Who" by Tony Cadena, Frank Agnew and Steve Soto.

No.	Title	Length
1.	"F*** You"	4:33
2.	"I Waste You"	3:38
3.	"Metropolis"	4:10
4.	"Smart Bomb"	4:24
5.	"Tombstone"	4:29
6.	"Who Is Who" (Adolescents cover)	1:05
7.	"Corporate Freak"	3:57
8.	"Countdown"	4:03
9.	"Die for You"	3:28
10.	"Metropolis" (Bounte Remix)	4:02
11.	"Need"	3:45

== Personnel ==
Adapted from the liner notes of The Treatment.

SMP

- Jason Bazinet – lead vocals, drums, programming

Additional performers

- Wade Alin – guitar, mixing, additional programming, production
- Rey Guajardo – drums (4)
- Chris Roy – guitar
- Mike Welch – guitar

Production and design

- Bethany Antikajian – photography
- Garrick Antikajian – cover art, illustrations, design
- Bryce Francis – recording

== Release history ==
Region	Date	Label	Format	Catalog
United States	2007	Music Ration Entertainment	CD	MRE103
