= Pissing on the Legacy =

Remix album by SMP
- Released: October 2008
- Genre: Industrial rock
- Length: 39:44
- Label: Music Ration Entertainment

SMP chronology
The Treatment (2007)	Pissing on the Legacy (2008)	Coda (2010)

Pissing on the Legacy is a remix album by SMP, released in October 2008 by Music Ration Entertainment.

== Track listing ==
All tracks are written by Jason Bazinet.

No.	Title	Remixer(s)	Length
1.	"Corporate Freak" (Bloodwire Remix)	Bloodwire	4:26
2.	"Metropolis" (Diskonnekted Remix)	Diskonnekted	4:46
3.	"Countdown" (Databind Remix)	Databind	4:34
4.	"Tombstone" (Hardwire Remix)	Hardwire	4:24
5.	"I Waste You" (Digital Geist Remix)	Digital Geist	4:02
6.	"F*** You" (Albatrosse Remix)	Albatrosse	4:22
7.	"Metropolis" (Penal Colony Remix)	Penal Colony	4:36
8.	"Tombstone" (Stochastic Theory Remix)	Stochastic Theory	4:52
9.	"I Waste You" (Spinefolder Remix)	Spinefolder	3:42

== Personnel ==
Adapted from the Pissing on the Legacy liner notes.

SMP

- Jason Bazinet – lead vocals, drums, programming

Additional performers

- Wade Alin – guitar, additional programming
- Dee Madden – additional vocals (2, 7)
- Chris Roy – guitar
- Mike Welch – guitar

== Release history ==
Region	Date	Label	Format	Catalog
United States	2008	Music Ration Entertainment	DL	
