= Ultimatum (SMP album) =

Studio album by SMP
- Released: May 12, 1998
- Studios: Unisect Studio (Portland, OR)
- Genre: Industrial rock
- Length: 71:01
- Label: Catastrophe

SMP chronology
Ultimatum EP 1.0 (1995)	Ultimatum (1998)	Terminal (2000)

Ultimatum is the second studio album by SMP, released on May 12, 1998, by Catastrophe Records. The album peaked at No. 19 on the CMJ RPM charts.

== Reception ==
Aiding & Abetting compared the music of Ultimatum favorably to Devo and Ice-T and noted the stronger influence of techno music in SMP's compositions. A critic at Last Sigh Magazine commended the band's maturation as composers, saying "SMP is possibly the first band in the genre to actually present something different instead of the boring *4-on-the-floor* trademark that nearly every electro act today showcases." Sonic Boom praised the songwriting and musicianship and noted that although less abrasive than Stalemate "the true essence of SMP still remains to brutally assault you with powerful media unfriendly themes and pulse pounding music."

== Track listing ==
All tracks are written by Jason Bazinet and Sean Setterberg, except "Electric Prod" by Noxious Emotion.

No.	Title	Length
1.	"Humanplayer"	1:10
2.	"Militia Love"	4:04
3.	"Nil Factor"	4:41
4.	"Success"	4:19
5.	"Intensity"	6:04
6.	"Pre-Emptive"	4:39
7.	"Fun & Games"	4:31
8.	"Born of Science" (Hybrid mix)	5:21
9.	"Riotstarter"	3:57
10.	"Negative"	4:25
11.	"Enemies"	4:42
12.	"Blackjack"	3:49
13.	"Electric Prod"	3:09
14.	"Dial M"	4:12
15.	"Topside"	4:50
16.	"Razed"	4:42
17.	"Gameover"	2:27

== Personnel ==
Adapted from the Ultimatum liner notes.

SMP

- Jason Bazinet – lead vocals, drums, recording, mixing
- Sean Setterberg (as Sean Ivy) – drums, recording and mixing (3, 13, 16), programming and sampler (7, 13)
- Xian Di Marris – drums, design

Production and design

- Aaron Edge – design
- Chris Hanzsek – mastering
- Jeremy Moss – bass guitar and additional vocals (3)
- Matt Sharifi – programming
- Deirdre Wehrman – photography
- Mike Wimer – additional vocals (10)

== Release history ==
Region	Date	Label	Format	Catalog
United States	1998	Catastrophe	CD	CTR002
United States	2016	Music Ration Entertainment	DL	
