= Hacked (album) =

Remix album by SMP
- Released: February 19, 2002
- Recorded: 2001
- Genre: Industrial rock
- Length: 70:54
- Label: Underground, Inc./Invisible

SMP chronology
Terminal (2000)	Hacked (2002)	Crimes of the Future (2004)

Hacked is a remix album by SMP, released on February 19, 2002 by Underground, Inc. and Invisible Records.

== Reception ==
Professional ratings
Review scores
Source	Rating
AllMusic	2.5/5 stars

Stewart Mason of AllMusic favorably compared Hacked to Skinny Puppy and Front Line Assembly but criticized the album for the amount of filler. He concluded by saying "only the most die-hard SMP fan will make it through this collection in one sitting."

== Track listing ==
No.	Title	Lyrics	Remixer	Length
1.	"Chemicals" (Mindless Mix)		Mindless Faith	4:34
2.	"September" (Jihad Style Mix)	Jason Bazinet; Jeremy Moss	Vers	2:44
3.	"Topside" (Spinefolder Mix)		Spinefolder	4:31
4.	"Megaton" (Doll Factory Mix)		Doll Factory	4:28
5.	"September" (Urania Mix)	Bazinet; Moss	Urania	4:40
6.	"Chemicals" (Doll Factory Mix)		Doll Factory	4:16
7.	"September" (Stromkern's Wl Bass Machine Mix)	Bazinet; Moss	Stromkern	5:14
8.	"Megaton" (Thine Eyes Mix)		Thine Eyes	4:17
9.	"September" (Med Lab Mix)	Bazinet; Moss	ML, Thine Eyes	3:50
10.	"Born of Science" (Hybrid Mix)		Akuma, Reverb	5:22
11.	"September" (Dataphantastiq Mix)	Bazinet; Moss	Dataphantastiq	4:13
12.	"Homeless" (Codec Mix)		Codec	4:18
13.	"Punch" (Cali-Code 285 Mix)	Bazinet; Moss	GASR	4:28
14.	"September" (Idiot Stare Mix)		Idiot Stare	4:17
15.	"Intensity" (Cold Mix)		SMP	4:56
16.	"Born of Science" (Datura Mix)		Datura	4:46

== Personnel ==
Adapted from the Hacked liner notes.

SMP

- Jason Bazinet – lead vocals

Production and design

- Steph Dumais – design
- Heather Ivy – cover art
- Robert Sydow – cover art
- Jeremy Moss – additional vocals (2, 5, 7, 11, 13)
- Robert Sydow – engineering
- Deirdre Wehrman – management

== Release history ==
Region	Date	Label	Format	Catalog
United States	2002	Underground, Inc./Invisible	CD	Ui1009
