= Eduard Mörike =

19th-century German poet

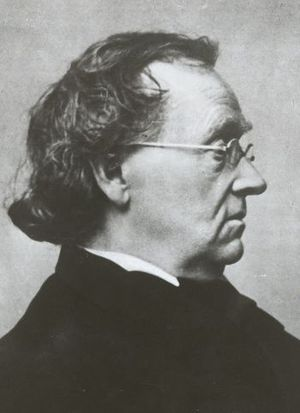
- Born: 8 September 1804; Ludwigsburg, Electorate of Württemberg, Holy Roman Empire
- Died: 4 June 1875 (aged 70); Stuttgart, Kingdom of Württemberg, German Empire
- Occupation: Writer

Eduard Friedrich Mörike (German pronunciation: [ˈeːdu.aʁt ˈfʁiːdʁɪç ˈmøːʁɪkə]; 8 September 1804 – 4 June 1875) was a German Lutheran pastor who was also a Romantic poet and writer of novellas and novels. Many of his poems were set to music and became established folk songs, while others were used by composers Hugo Wolf and Ignaz Lachner in their symphonic works.

== Biography ==
Mörike was born in Ludwigsburg as the seventh child of Karl Friedrich Mörike (1763–1817), a district medical councilor and his wife Charlotte Mörike née Bayer (1771–1841). He had 13 siblings of which seven died young. After the death of his father, in 1817, he went to live with his uncle Eberhard Friedrich von Georgii, president of Württemberg Supreme Tribunal in Stuttgart, who intended his nephew to become a clergyman.

After one year at the Stuttgart Gymnasium Illustre, he scored low grades and failed the admission test to Urach Seminary, yet was accepted anyhow. Mörike joined the Evangelical Seminary Urach, a humanist grammar school, in 1818. There he found his closest friend, Wilhelm Hartlaub (1804–1885), as well as Johannes Mährlen (1803–1871), to whom he remained close throughout his life. Also close from this time onward was the brilliant poet Wilhelm Waiblinger, who died in 1830. He published a selection of Waiblinger's poems in 1844 and dedicated an essay to him in 1845.

From 1822 to 1826 attended the Tübinger Stift Seminary to study theology and classics, the latter something that was to become a major influence on his writing. He met the kindred spirit and poetically gifted Ludwig Amandus Bauer (1803–1846). In 1825, Friedrich Theodor Vischer and David Friedrich Strauss joined. Many of these friendships were long-lasting. In Tübingen, with Bauer, he invented the fairyland Orplid – see the poem Song Weylas (You are Orplid) dating from 1831. Their shared imaginations gave rise to the Orplid myth, which they later developed into a literary work.

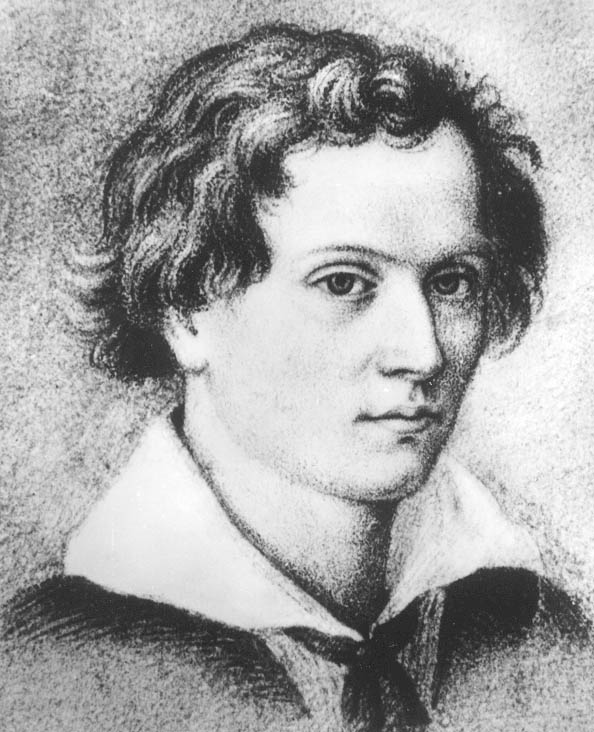
Eduard Mörike (aged 20) as a student at Tübingen Stift, in 1824

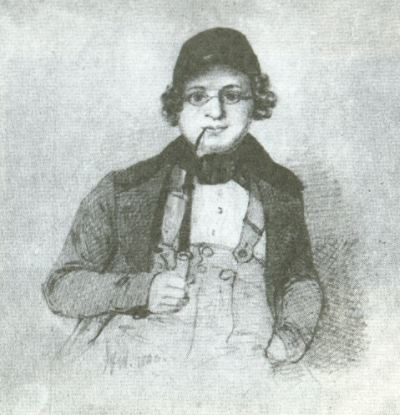
Eduard Mörike, pencil drawing by Josef Wagner, in 1840

After passing his theological examination in October 1826 and subsequently serving as a Lutheran pastor in Oberboihingen, Möhringen, and Köngen, Mörike was able to secure an extended leave of absence in 1828, originally intended to facilitate a career change, but which he devoted almost entirely to his poetic passion. Mörike's attempt to earn a living as a freelance writer and thus escape the "servitude of the pastor"—"Anything but a clergyman!" he had already declared in a letter to Johannes Mährlen in February 1828 — proved unsuccessful. His return to the vicarage in February 1829, this time to Pflummern, plunged him into a hopeless conflict of conscience, since he believed that anyone who "serves the Church with a heart like mine" commits a "sin against the Holy Spirit... I am brooding over a plan that will set me free again and forever" (March 26, 1829, to Mährlen). The seemingly hopeless situation was resolved by his transfer in May 1829 to Plattenhardt in the Filder region, where he met the pastor's daughter, Luise Rau, a "simple, holy, innocent creature" (July 23, 1830, to Wilhelm Hartlaub), but one who was hardly a match for the poet. The calming effect of his relationship with Luise – they became engaged in August 1829 – is evident, among other things, in his changed attitude towards the subsequent vicarages in Owen, Eltingen, and Ochsenwang, which lasted until 1833. The uncertainty surrounding the "eternal pastor's" continued existence, as well as Luise's lack of understanding of Mörike's poetry, likely predetermined the breaking of the engagement, which was carried out in the Autumn of 1833: "a catastrophe of paramount importance to my entire life, the painful unfolding of which consumed everything else in my life" (Dec. 20, 1833, to Friedrich Theodor Vischer).

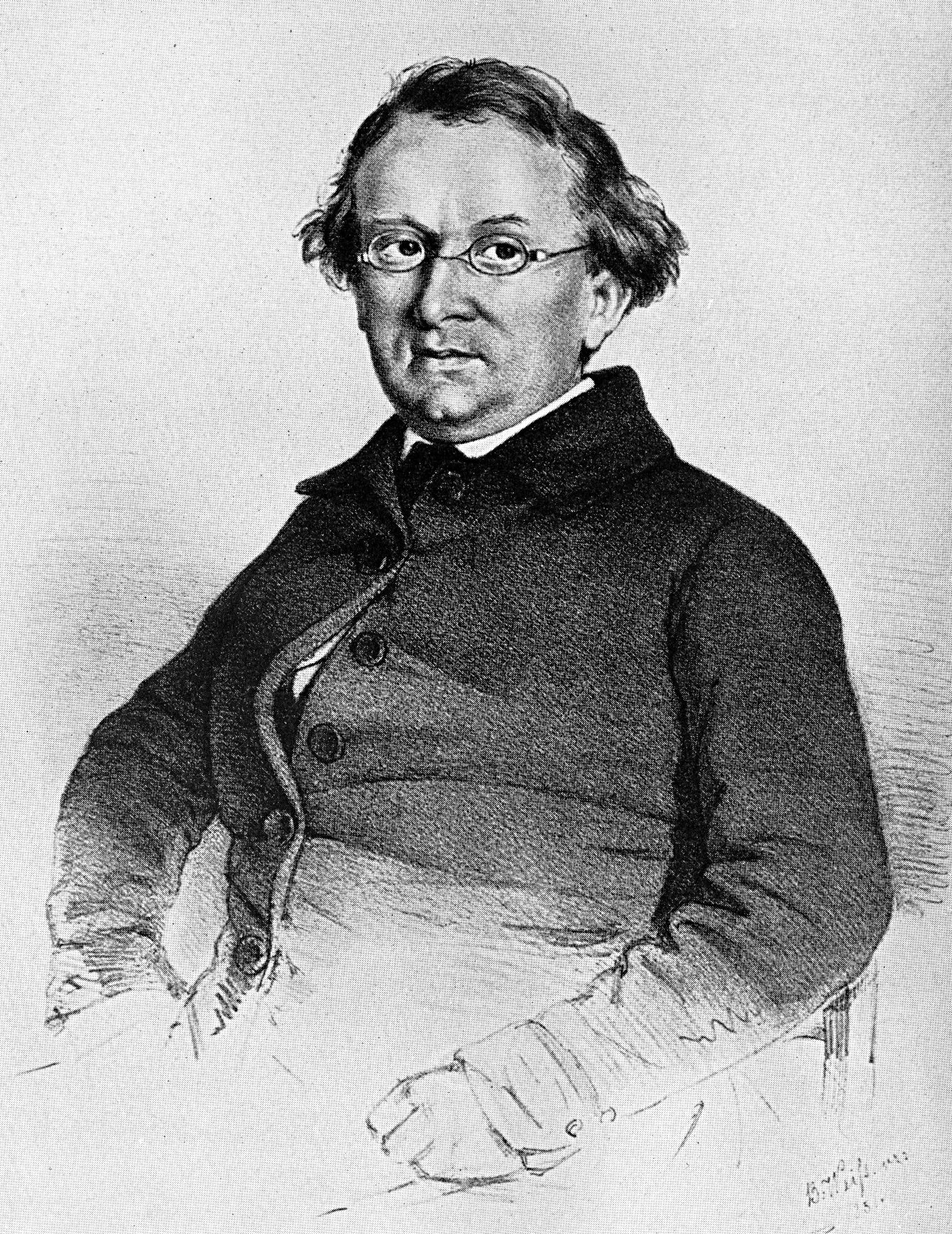
Eduard Mörike (1804–1875), poet in 1851

In 1834, he was appointed pastor of Cleversulzbach near Weinsberg. In the Autumn of 1843 he stayed for over half a year with his friend Pastor Wilhelm Hartlaub (1804–1885) in the village of Wermutshausen, situated in the state of Baden-Württemberg in southern Germany. During this time he produced a drawing of the Wermutshausen Petruskirche, dating from the early 1800s. This drawing is speculated, due to the perspective, to be from a top-floor room of a local brewery, distillery, and guesthouse at the edge of town, which remains in operation today as Gasthaus und Manufaktur Krone Wermutshausen. In town there is also a Museum commemorating this visit, in which guests can see the room in which Mörike lived.

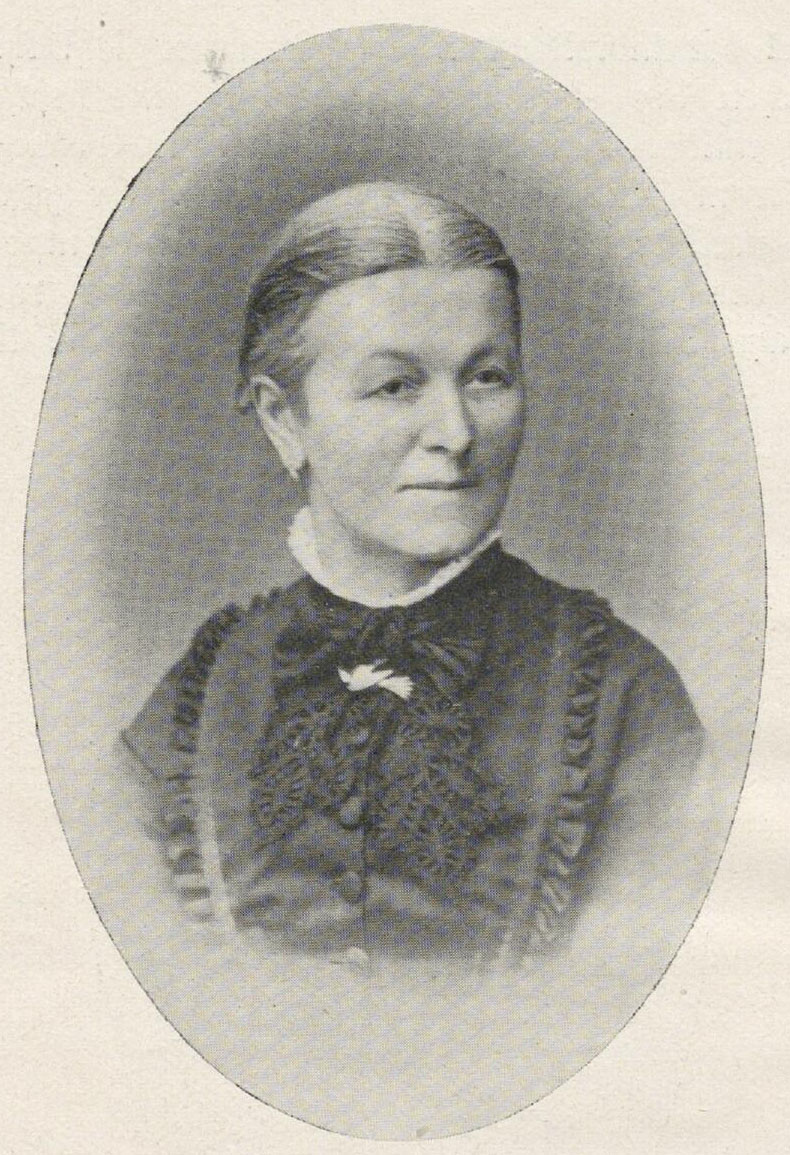
Margarethe Mörike, née Speeth (1818–1903), wife of Eduard Mörike in 1875

Besides "The Old Weathervane," numerous love poems were written in 1845/1846, inspired by his encounter with a Bavarian born Margarethe Speeth (1818–1903), in whose parents' house in Mergentheim he and his sister Clara (1816–1903), who managed Mörike's household; had taken up residence in April 1845. Since the siblings had been living in close family unity since Cleversulzbach, Margarethe's arrival and Mörike's rapidly intensifying relationship with her created a complex interpersonal dynamic, as hinted at in the poem "To Clärchen" (1845), dedicated to his sister. The love poems, written in rapid succession, reveal a gentle skepticism, as seen in "God's Wink" and "Margareta" (both 1845), or the dialogue poem "From Afar" (1846), which, unmistakably a homage to the "Divan," like all the poetry of this period, approaches Goethe's style without losing its own distinctive character.

The burdens placed on him by his love for Margarethe increased in the following years. His friendship with Lutheran pastor Wilhelm Hartlaub was threatened by her Catholicism; after her father's, Lieutenant Colonel Valentin von Speeth's (1778–1845) death in 1845, the inheritance led to protracted family tensions. Their first daughter Franziska („Fanny“) Mörike (1855–1930) was born a year later. His continuing difficult financial circumstances, as well as his indecisiveness, prevented him from marrying for more than six years. Mörike reacted to this debilitating situation, as he had in Cleversulzbach, with significant health problems, which he attempted to alleviate through spa treatments and travel. After an extended stay in the Autumn of 1850 with his brother Louis at the Pürkel estate near Regensburg, he traveled with Clara to Lake Constance for three months in 1851, hoping to establish a girls' boarding school in Constance. When this plan failed, Mörike moved to Stuttgart, where, in the Autumn of 1851, through the mediation of his friends, he finally succeeded Gustav Schwab as a literature teacher at the Königin-Katharina-Stift-Gymnasium. He was appointed to the Katharinenstift for girls, a position that finally enabled him to marry in 1851.

For reasons of health, Mörike retired quite early, and in 1851 became teacher of German literature at the Katharinenstift girlschool in Stuttgart and was given the titel of professor in 1856. This office he held until he retired in 1866. He continued to live in Stuttgart until his death. He and Margarethe separated in 1873 and he lived with his sister Clara and his younger daughter Marie Mörike (1857–1876).

== Works ==
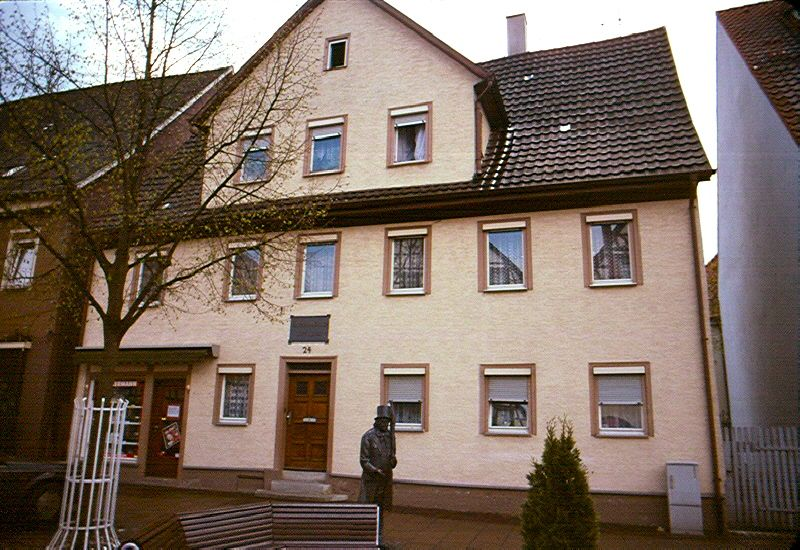
Mörike's home in Lorch, Württemberg

Mörike was a member of the so-called Swabian school of writers around Ludwig Uhland, Gustav Schwab and Justinus Kerner. His poems (Gedichte, 1838), are mostly lyrical, yet often humorous and written in simple and seemingly everyday German. His ballad "Schön Rotraut" – opening with the line "Wie heisst König Ringangs Töchterlein?" – became a popular favorite.

His first published work was the novel Maler Nolten ("The Painter Nolten", 1832), a tale about the life of a painter, and which revealed his imaginative power; it became fairly popular. The novella Mozart auf der Reise nach Prag ("Mozart on the way to Prague", 1856) was a humorous examination of the problems of artists in a world uncongenial to art. It is frequently cited as his finest achievement. He also wrote a somewhat fantastic Idylle vom Bodensee, oder Fischer Martin und die Glockendiebe (1846), the fairy tale Das Stuttgarter Hutzelmännlein (1855), and published a collection of hymns, odes, elegies, and idylls of the Greeks and Romans, entitled Klassische Blumenlese (1840). He also translated expertly Anacreon and Theocritus into German.

Mörike's Gesammelte Schriften ("Collected Writings") were first published posthumously in 1878 (4 vols.). Later editions are those edited by R. Krauss (6 vols., 1905), and the Volksausgabe ("Popular edition"), published by Göschen (4 vols., 1905). Selections from his literary estate were published by R. Krauss in Eduard Mörike als Gelegenheitsdichter (1895), and his correspondence with Hermann Kurz, Moritz von Schwind, and Theodor Storm, by J. Bachtold (1885–1891); an edition of Mörike's Ausgewählte Briefe ("Selected letters"), in 2 vols., appeared 1903–1904.

His work was greatly praised by the philosopher Ludwig Wittgenstein who recommended him to Bertrand Russell as

really a great poet and his poems are among the best things we have...the beauty of Mörike's work is very closely related to Goethe's.

=== Musical settings ===
Many of his lyrics were set to music by Hugo Wolf, Ludwig Hetsch, Didia Saint Georges, Elise Schmezer, Julie Waldburg-Wurzach, Pauline Volkstein, and Fritz Kauffmann. Ignaz Lachner set to music his opera Die Regenbrüder. Hugo Distler composed 48 settings of Mörike's poetry in his Mörike-Chorliederbuch. Many of his poems became established folksongs. Wilhelm Killmayer set several of his poems in his song cycle Mörike-Lieder in 2003.

=== As an artist ===
Mörike was also known to produce drawings in his time, though it is not the subject of much discussion. While staying in the town of Wermutshausen in the Autumn of 1843, Mörike produced a drawing of the Petruskirche, a small church built in the early 1800s.
