= Euro gold and silver commemorative coins (Germany) =

Federal Republic of Germany Bundesrepublik Deutschland

This article covers euro gold and silver commemorative coins issued in Germany. It also covers rare cases of collectors coins (coins not planned for normal circulation) minted using other precious metals. It does not cover either the German €2 commemorative coins or the Pre-Euro German Currencies. For euro gold and silver commemorative coins of other countries see Euro gold and silver commemorative coins.

== 2002 coinage ==
Introduction of the euro			
Designer: Erich Ott		Mint: F	
Value: €10	Alloy: 925 Ag	Quantity: 2,000,000/400,000	Quality: Unc/proof
Issued: 2002 January 23	Diameter: 32.5 mm (1.28 in)	Weight: 18 g	Market Value:
Introduction of the euro			
Designer: AZ Jezovsek, Neuberg		Mint: A, D, F, G, J	
Value: €100	Alloy: 999.9 Au	Quantity: 500,000	Quality:
Issued: 2002 May 9	Diameter: 28 mm (1.1 in)	Weight: 15.55 g	Market Value:
Introduction of the euro			
Designer: A.Z. Jezovsek, Neuberg		Mint: A, D, F, G, J	
Value: €200	Alloy: 999.9 Au	Quantity: 100,000	Quality:
Issued: 2002 September 9	Diameter: 32.5 mm (1.28 in)	Weight: 31.1 g	Market Value:
100th anniversary of German subways			
Designer: Bodo Broschat, Berlin		Mint: D	
Value: €10	Alloy: 925 Ag	Quantity: 2,000,000/400,000	Quality: Unc/proof
Issued: 2002 January 1	Diameter: 32.5 mm (1.28 in)	Weight: 18 g	Market Value:
Documenta art exhibition			
Designer: Frantisek Chocola, Hamburg		Mint: J	
Value: €10	Alloy: 925 Ag	Quantity: 2,000,000/300,000	Quality: Unc/proof
Issued: 2002 May 2	Diameter: 32.5 mm (1.28 in)	Weight: 18 g	Market Value:
Museum Island in Berlin			
Designer: Frantisek Chocola, Hamburg		Mint: A	
Value: €10	Alloy: 925 Ag	Quantity: 2,000,000/280,000	Quality: Unc/proof
Issued: 2002 August 8	Diameter: 32.5 mm (1.28 in)	Weight: 18 g	Market Value:
50th anniversary of German television			
Designer: Jordi Regel, Berlin		Mint: G	
Value: €10	Alloy: 925 Ag	Quantity: 2,000,000/290,000	Quality: Unc/proof
Issued: 2002 November 7	Diameter: 32.5 mm (1.28 in)	Weight: 18 g	Market Value:

== 2003 coinage ==
100th anniversary of the German Museum			
Designer: Victor Huster, Baden-Baden		Mint: D	
Value: €10	Alloy: Ag	Quantity: 2,050,000/350,000	Quality: Unc/proof
Issued: 2003 April 10	Diameter: 32.5 mm (1.28 in)	Weight: 18 g	Market Value:
200th birthday of Justus Liebig			
Designer: Bodo Broschat, Berlin		Mint: J	
Value: €10	Alloy: Ag	Quantity: 2,050,000/350,000	Quality: Unc/proof
Issued: 2003 May 8	Diameter: 32.5 mm (1.28 in)	Weight: 18 g	Market Value:
50th anniversary of the 1953 East German uprising			
Designer: Hans Joa Dobler, Ehekirchen		Mint: A	
Value: €10	Alloy: Ag	Quantity: 2,050,000/350,000	Quality: Unc/proof
Issued: 2003 June 12	Diameter: 32.5 mm (1.28 in)	Weight: 18 g	Market Value:
Football World Cup 2006			
Designer: Lucia Maria Hardegen, Bonn; Erich Ott, Munich		Mint: A, D, F, G, J	
Value: €10	Alloy: Ag	Quantity: 3,550,000/400,000	Quality: Unc/proof
Issued: 2003 July 5	Diameter: 32.5 mm (1.28 in)	Weight: 18 g	Market Value:
Ruhr industrial area			
Designer: Hans Joa Dobler, Ehekirchen		Mint: F	
Value: €10	Alloy: Ag	Quantity: 2,050,000/350,000	Quality: Unc/proof
Issued: 2003 July 10	Diameter: 32.5 mm (1.28 in)	Weight: 18 g	Market Value:
200th birthday of Gottfried Semper			
Designer: Michael Otto, Rodenbach		Mint: G	
Value: €10	Alloy: Ag	Quantity: 2,050,000/350,000	Quality: Unc/proof
Issued: 2003 November 13	Diameter: 32.5 mm (1.28 in)	Weight: 18 g	Market Value:
Quedlinburg, World Heritage Site			
Designer: Agatha Kill, Cologne		Mint: A, D, F, G, J	
Value: €100	Alloy: Au	Quantity: 400,000	Quality:
Issued: 2003 November 1	Diameter: 28 mm (1.1 in)	Weight: 15.55 g (1/2 oz)	Market Value:

== 2004 coinage ==
Football World Cup 2006			
Designer: Lucia Maria Hardegen, Bonn; Erich Ott, München		Mint: A, D, F, G, J	
Value: €10	Alloy: Ag	Quantity: 4,000,000/400,000	Quality: Unc/proof
Issued: 2004 February 5	Diameter: 32.5 mm (1.28 in)	Weight: 18 g	Market Value:
Bauhaus in Dessau			
Designer: Heinz Hoyer, Berlin		Mint: A	
Value: €10	Alloy: Ag	Quantity: 1,800,000/300,000	Quality: Unc/proof
Issued: 2004 April 7	Diameter: 32.5 mm (1.28 in)	Weight: 18 g	Market Value:
Enlargement of the European Union			
Designer: Aase Thorsen, Molsberg		Mint: G	
Value: €10	Alloy: Ag	Quantity: 1,800,000/300,000	Quality: Unc/proof
Issued: 2004 May 6	Diameter: 32.5 mm (1.28 in)	Weight: 18 g	Market Value:
Wadden Sea National Parks			
Designer: Dietrich Dorfstecher, Berlin		Mint: J	
Value: €10	Alloy: Ag	Quantity: 1,800,000/300,000	Quality: Unc/proof
Issued: 2004 June 3	Diameter: 32.5 mm (1.28 in)	Weight: 18 g	Market Value:
200th birthday of Eduard Mörike			
Designer: Erich Ott, München		Mint: F	
Value: €10	Alloy: Ag	Quantity: 1,800,000/300,000	Quality: Unc/proof
Issued: 2004 September 9	Diameter: 32.5 mm (1.28 in)	Weight: 18 g	Market Value:
Columbus for the International Space Station			
Designer: Frantisek Chochola, Hamburg		Mint: D	
Value: €10	Alloy: Ag	Quantity: 1,800,000/300,000	Quality: Unc/proof
Issued: 2004 November 4	Diameter: 32.5 mm (1.28 in)	Weight: 18 g	Market Value:
UNESCO World Heritage in Germany - the City of Bamberg			
Designer: Prof. Ulrich Böhme, Stuttgart		Mint: A, D, F, G, J	
Value: €100	Alloy: Au	Quantity: 400,000	Quality:
Issued: 2004 October 1	Diameter: 28 mm (1.1 in)	Weight: 15.55 g (1/2 oz)	Market Value:

== 2005 coinage ==
FIFA World Cup Germany 2006			
Designer: Lucia Maria Hardegen, Bonn; Erich Ott, München		Mint: A, D, F, G, J	
Value: €10	Alloy: Ag	Quantity: 4,000,000/400,000	Quality: Unc/proof
Issued: 2005 February 10	Diameter: 32.5 mm (1.28 in)	Weight: 18 g	Market Value:
Bavarian Forest National Park			
Designer: Bodo Broschat, Berlin		Mint: D	
Value: €10	Alloy: Ag	Quantity: 1,800,000/300,000	Quality: Unc/proof
Issued: 2005 April 7	Diameter: 32.5 mm (1.28 in)	Weight: 18 g	Market Value:
200th death anniversary of Friedrich von Schiller			
Designer: Carsten Theumer, Höhnstedt		Mint: G	
Value: €10	Alloy: Ag	Quantity: 1,800,000/300,000	Quality: Unc/proof
Issued: 2005 May 12	Diameter: 32.5 mm (1.28 in)	Weight: 18 g	Market Value:
100th anniversary of Einstein's Theory of relativity			
Designer: Heinz Hoyer, Berlin		Mint: J	
Value: €10	Alloy: Ag	Quantity: 1,800,000/300,000	Quality: Unc/proof
Issued: 2005 July 7	Diameter: 32.5 mm (1.28 in)	Weight: 18 g	Market Value:
1,200th anniversary of Magdeburg			
Designer: Heinz Hoyer, Berlin		Mint: A	
Value: €10	Alloy: Ag	Quantity: 1,800,000/300,000	Quality: Unc/proof
Issued: 2005 September 8	Diameter: 32.5 mm (1.28 in)	Weight: 18 g	Market Value:
100th anniversary of Bertha von Suttner's Nobel Peace Prize			
Designer: Bodo Broschat, Berlin		Mint: F	
Value: €10	Alloy: Ag	Quantity: 1,800,000/300,000	Quality: Unc/proof
Issued: 2005 November 3	Diameter: 32.5 mm (1.28 in)	Weight: 18 g	Market Value:
FIFA World Cup Germany 2006			
Designer: Heinz Hoyer, Berlin; Erich Ott, München		Mint: A, D, F, G, J	
Value: €100	Alloy: Au	Quantity: 350,000	Quality:
Issued: 2005 October 4	Diameter: 28 mm (1.1 in)	Weight: 15.55 g (1/2 oz)	Market Value:

== 2006 coinage ==
250th anniversary of Wolfgang Amadeus Mozart			
Designer: Jordi Regel		Mint: D	
Value: €10	Alloy: Ag	Quantity: 1,800,000/300,000	Quality: Unc/proof
Issued: 2006 January 2	Diameter: 32.5 mm (1.28 in)	Weight: 18 g	Market Value:
FIFA World Cup Germany 2006			
Designer: Lucia Maria Hardegen, Bonn; Erich Ott, München		Mint: A, D, F, G, J	
Value: €10	Alloy: Ag	Quantity: 4,000,000/400,000	Quality: Unc/proof
Issued: 2006 February 9	Diameter: 32.5 mm (1.28 in)	Weight: 18 g	Market Value:
There is no originary letter showing the mint; instead you have to take a look at the border text. If the middle line of the letter E is shortened by the half, it shows the mint: DIE WELT ZU GAST BEI FREUNDEN: A (Berlin); DIE WELT ZU GAST BEI FREUNDEN: D (München); DIE WELT ZU GAST BEI FREUNDEN: F (Stuttgart); DIE WELT ZU GAST BEI FREUNDEN: G (Karlsruhe); DIE WELT ZU GAST BEI FREUNDEN: J (Hamburg); The text means: The world as a guest with friends.			
225th anniversary of Karl Friedrich Schinkel			
Designer: Axel Bertram		Mint: F	
Value: €10	Alloy: Ag	Quantity: 1,800,000/300,000	Quality: Unc/proof
Issued: 2006 March 2	Diameter: 32.5 mm (1.28 in)	Weight: 18 g	Market Value:
800 years of Dresden			
Designer: Heinz Hoyer		Mint: A	
Value: €10	Alloy: Ag	Quantity: 1,800,000/300,000	Quality: Unc/proof
Issued: 2006 August 24	Diameter: 32.5 mm (1.28 in)	Weight: 18 g	Market Value:
650 years of Hanseatic League			
Designer: Erich Ott		Mint: J	
Value: €10	Alloy: Ag	Quantity: 1,800,000/300,000	Quality: Unc/proof
Issued: 2006 September 7	Diameter: 32.5 mm (1.28 in)	Weight: 18 g	Market Value:
UNESCO World Heritage City of Weimar			
Designer: Dietrich Dorfstecher		Mint: A, D, F, G, J	
Value: €100	Alloy: Au	Quantity: 350,000	Quality:
Issued: 2006 October 2	Diameter: 28 mm (1.1 in)	Weight: 15.55 g (1/2 oz)	Market Value:

== 2007 coinage ==
50 years of Saarland			
Designer: Erika Binz-Blanke, Baden-Baden		Mint: G	
Value: €10	Alloy: Ag	Quantity: 1,600,000/300,000	Quality: Unc/proof
Issued: 2007 January 18	Diameter: 32.5 mm (1.28 in)	Weight: 18 g	Market Value:
50 years of Treaty of Rome			
Designer: Carsten Mahn, Berlin		Mint: F	
Value: €10	Alloy: Ag	Quantity: 1,600,000/300,000	Quality: Unc/proof
Issued: 2007 March 1	Diameter: 32.5 mm (1.28 in)	Weight: 18 g	Market Value:
175th anniversary of Wilhelm Busch			
Designer: Othmar Kukula, Neuhausen		Mint: D	
Value: €10	Alloy: Ag	Quantity: 1,600,000/300,000	Quality: Unc/proof
Issued: 2007 June 14	Diameter: 32.5 mm (1.28 in)	Weight: 18 g	Market Value:
50 years of Deutsche Bundesbank			
Designer: Susanne Kraißer, Bremen		Mint: J	
Value: €10	Alloy: Ag	Quantity: 1,600,000/300,000	Quality: Unc/proof
Issued: 2007 August 9	Diameter: 32.5 mm (1.28 in)	Weight: 18 g	Market Value:
800th anniversary of Elizabeth of Thuringia			
Designer: Barbara G. Ruppel, Krailling		Mint: A	
Value: €10	Alloy: Ag	Quantity: 1,600,000/300,000	Quality: Unc/proof
Issued: 2007 November 8	Diameter: 32.5 mm (1.28 in)	Weight: 18 g	Market Value:
UNESCO World Heritage City of Lübeck			
Designer: Bodo Broschat		Mint: A, D, F, G, J	
Value: €100	Alloy: Au	Quantity: 330,000	Quality:
Issued: 2007 October	Diameter: 28 mm (1.1 in)	Weight: 15.55 g (1/2 oz)	Market Value:

== 2008 coinage ==
200th anniversary of Carl Spitzweg			
Designer: Hannes Dauer, Schönbrunn-Steinsdorf		Mint: D	
Value: €10	Alloy: 925 Ag	Quantity: 1,500,000/260,000	Quality: Unc/proof
Issued: 2008 February 7	Diameter: 32.5 mm (1.28 in)	Weight: 18 g	Market Value:
150th anniversary of Max Planck			
Designer: Michael Otto, Rodenbach		Mint: F	
Value: €10	Alloy: 925 Ag	Quantity: 1,500,000/260,000	Quality: Unc/proof
Issued: 2008 April 10	Diameter: 32.5 mm (1.28 in)	Weight: 18 g	Market Value:
125th anniversary of Franz Kafka			
Designer: Frantisek Chochola, Hamburg		Mint: G	
Value: €10	Alloy: 925 Ag	Quantity: 1,500,000/260,000	Quality: Unc/proof
Issued: 2008 July 10	Diameter: 32.5 mm (1.28 in)	Weight: 18 g	Market Value:
50 years of Gorch Fock			
Designer: Frantisek Chochola, Hamburg		Mint: J	
Value: €10	Alloy: 925 Ag	Quantity: 1,500,000/260,000	Quality: Unc/proof
Issued: 2008 August 7	Diameter: 32.5 mm (1.28 in)	Weight: 18 g	Market Value:
Nebra Sky Disk			
Designer: Bodo Broschat, Berlin		Mint: A	
Value: €10	Alloy: 925 Ag	Quantity: 1,500,000/260,000	Quality: Unc/proof
Issued: 2008 October 9	Diameter: 32.5 mm (1.28 in)	Weight: 18 g	Market Value:
UNESCO World Heritage City of Goslar			
Designer: Wolfgang Th. Doehm, Stuttgart		Mint: A, D, F, G, J	
Value: €100	Alloy: 999.9 Au	Quantity: 320,000	Quality:
Issued: 2008 October	Diameter: 28 mm (1.1 in)	Weight: 15.55 g (1/2 oz)	Market Value:

== 2009 coinage ==
2009 World Championships in Athletics, Berlin			
Designer: Bodo Broschat, Berlin		Mint: A,D,F,G,J	
Value: €10	Alloy: 925 Ag	Quantity: 200,000	Quality:
Issued: 2009 April 9	Diameter: 32.5 mm (1.28 in)	Weight: 18 g	Market Value:
400 Years of Kepler's laws			
Designer: Prof. Ulrich Böhme, Stuttgart		Mint: F	
Value: €10	Alloy: 925 Ag	Quantity: 200,000	Quality:
Issued: 2009 May 7	Diameter: 32.5 mm (1.28 in)	Weight: 18 g	Market Value:
100 Years of International Aerospace Exhibition			
Designer: Bodo Broschat, Berlin		Mint: D	
Value: €10	Alloy: 925 Ag	Quantity: 200,000	Quality:
Issued: 2009 June 4	Diameter: 32.5 mm (1.28 in)	Weight: 18 g	Market Value:
600 Years of University of Leipzig			
Designer: Dietrich Dorfstecher, Berlin		Mint: A	
Value: €10	Alloy: 925 Ag	Quantity: 200,000	Quality:
Issued: 2009 July 9	Diameter: 32.5 mm (1.28 in)	Weight: 18 g	Market Value:
100 Years of Youth Hostels			
Designer: Hans Joa Dobler, Ehekirchen		Mint: G	
Value: €10	Alloy: 925 Ag	Quantity: 200,000	Quality:
Issued: 2009 August 13	Diameter: 32.5 mm (1.28 in)	Weight: 18 g	Market Value:
100 Years of Marion Dönhoff			
Designer: Prof. Christian Höpfner, Berlin		Mint: J	
Value: €10	Alloy: 925 Ag	Quantity: 200,000	Quality:
Issued: 2009 November 12	Diameter: 32.5 mm (1.28 in)	Weight: 18 g	Market Value:
UNESCO World Heritage - Cathedral of Saint Peter and Church of Our Lady in Trier			
Designer: Michael Otto, Rodenbach		Mint: A, D, F, G, J	
Value: €100	Alloy: 999.9 Au	Quantity: 320,000	Quality:
Issued: 2009 October	Diameter: 28 mm (1.1 in)	Weight: 15.55 g	Market Value:

== 2010 coinage ==
UNESCO World Heritage - Würzburg Residence with the Court Gardens and Residence Square in Würzburg			
Designer: Dietrich Dorfstecher, Berlin		Mint: A, D, F, G, J	
Value: €100	Alloy: 999.9 Au	Quantity: 320,000	Quality:
Issued: 2010 October	Diameter: 28 mm (1.1 in)	Weight: 15.55 g	Market Value:

== 2011 coinage ==
UNESCO World Heritage - Wartburg in Wartburg			
Designer: Wolfgang Reuter, Köln		Mint: A, D, F, G, J	
Value: €100	Alloy: 999.9 Au	Quantity: 300,000	Quality:
Issued: 2011 October	Diameter: 28 mm (1.1 in)	Weight: 15.55 g	Market Value: 653.20 €
