= Death of the Format =

Studio album by SMP
- Released: June 11, 2013
- Genre: Industrial rock
- Length: 40:40
- Label: WTII
- Producer: Jason Bazinet; Chris Demarcus; Michael Ostrander

SMP chronology
Shot (2011)	Death of the Format (2013)	Hacked Vol. 2 (2016)

Death of the Format is the seventh studio album by SMP, released on June 11, 2013 by WTII Records.

== Reception ==
DJ Arcanus of Lollipop Magazine gave Death of the Format a mixed review, saying "SMP (Sounds of Mass Production) delivers on the promise of "Metal Madness" with these five minutes of hard driving beats that layer metal aggression (and a delightfully wanky guitar solo) over a dance/industrial skeleton, along the lines of Pain or Rammstein."

== Track listing ==
All tracks are written by Jason Bazinet and Sean Ivy.

No.	Title	Length
1.	"In Your Blood"	4:59
2.	"Metal Madness"	4:52
3.	"Endlust"	7:08
4.	"Somebody Dissin' You"	4:46
5.	"I'm Falling"	4:34
6.	"Earthlight"	2:21
7.	"Still Sick"	4:04
8.	"What's Wrong With You?"	3:21
9.	"In the City"	4:35

== Personnel ==
Adapted from the Death of the Format liner notes.

SMP

- Jason Bazinet – lead vocals, drums, programming, production
- Michael Ostrander – programming, production, mixing

Additional performers

- Chris Demarcus – drum programming, guitar, production, mixing
- Dan Miura – guitar
- Jason Porter – vocals (8)
- Benn Tranq – vocals (4)
- Kerry Vink – vocals
- Galen Waling – drums

Production and design

- Wade Alin – mastering
- Bethany Antikajian – photography
- Garrick Antikajian – cover art, design
- Mike Krutz – illustrations

== Release history ==
Region	Date	Label	Format	Catalog
United States	2013	WTII	CD	WTII 086
