= Giovanni Battista Bertucci =

Italian painter

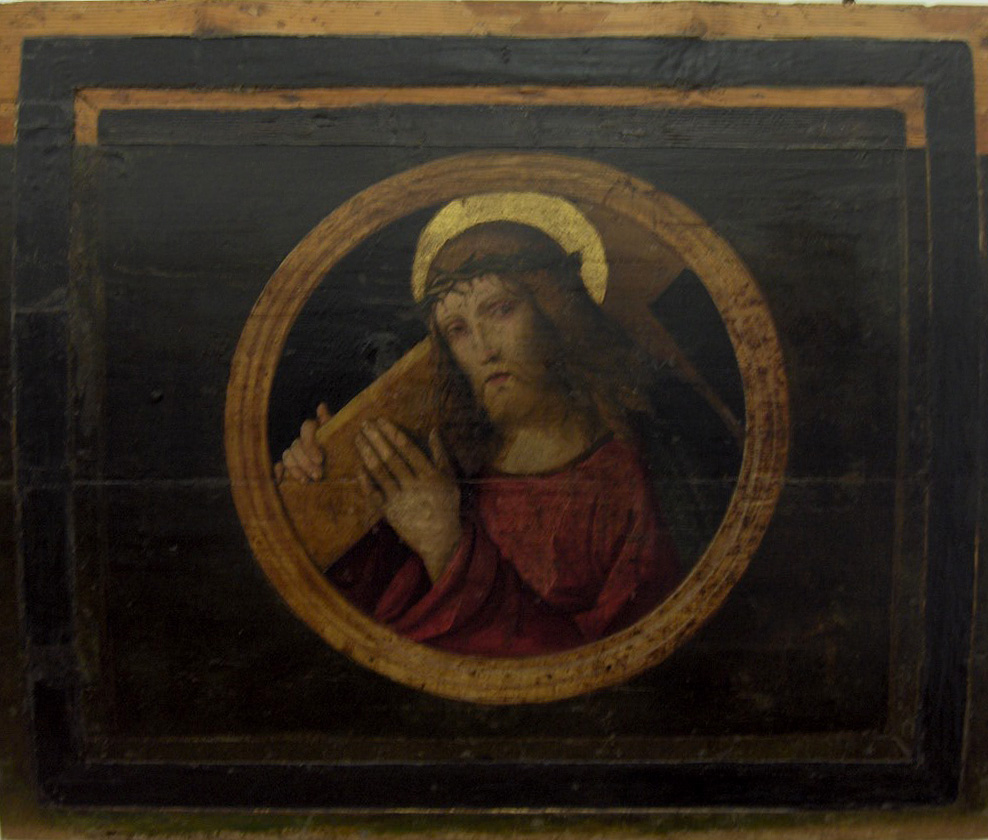
Christ carrying the Cross, either by Bartolomeo Coda or by Bertucci, now in the City Museum of Rimini

Giovanni Battista da Faenza, called Bertucci, who painted in the style of Perugino and Pinturicchio, flourished in the early part of the 16th century at Faenza. In the Pinacoteca of that city there are various works ascribed to him, of which the most remarkable is a Majesty, signed by him and bearing the date 1506. Crowe and Cavalcaselle also claim for Bertucci an Adoration of the Magi in the Berlin Gallery, there ascribed to Pinturicchio, and a Glorification of the Virgin in the National Gallery, given in the catalogue to Lo Spagna, who was a pupil of Perugino.

His last will and testament, dated 1594, was collected in Gualandi's Memori.
