= SMP (band) =

American industrial music group

- Also known as: Sounds of Mass Production, Synthesia Murder Program
- Origin: Seattle, Washington, U.S.
- Genres: Industrial rock
- Years active: 1992–present
- Labels: Music Ration Entertainment; Re-Constriction; Underground, Inc.
- Members: Jason Bazinet
- Past members: Matt Sharifi; Rick Aguilar; Sean Ivy; Xian Di Marris
- Website: jasonbazinet.com/smp

SMP (also known as Synthesia Murder Program) are an American industrial music group formed in Seattle, Washington. The original incarnation consisted of Jason Bazinet and Sean Ivy before Ivy left to join Christ Analogue in 1998, allowing SMP to function as a solo vehicle for Bazinet's musical output. The project was then put on hiatus in 2008, before being brought back in 2010. SMP continues to issue albums digitally with Hacked Vol. 2 being released in 2016 by Music Ration Entertainment.

== History ==
Musicians Sean Setterberg, later taking the moniker Sean Ivy, and Jason Bazinet were originally based in San Diego and San Francisco before relocating to Washington and forming Synthesia Murder Program. The duo's sample-based sound was informed by industrial music, punk music and rap music. The band self-released their debut EP called Stalemate in 1994. In 1995, SMP issued their debut studio album Stalemate after signing to Re-Constriction Records. The album was critically acclaimed, with John Bush of allmusic declaring that "SMP recall[s] the industrial grooves of My Life With the Thrill Kill Kult on Stalemate, except with more of an emphasis on rapping."

After Stalemate's release the band decided to change artistic direction and opted to embrace a less abrasive sound. Showcasing a greater emphasis on techno music, SMP issued their second album Ultimatum in 1998 on Catastrophe Records. Sean Ivy left SMP around this time to join Christ Analogue and was replaced by guitarist Rick Aguilar and drummers Matt Sharifi and Xian Di Marris. SMP's third full-length album Terminal saw the return of Sean Ivy and was released in 2000, a remix album titled Hacked followed in 2002.

== Discography ==
=== Studio albums ===
- Stalemate (Re-Constriction, 1995)
- Ultimatum (Catastrophe, 1998) – #19 CMJ RPM
- Terminal (A.D.S.R. Musicwerks, 2000)
- Hacked (2002, Underground, Inc./Invisible)
- Crimes of the Future (2004, Music Ration Entertainment)
- The Treatment (2007, Music Ration Entertainment)
- Pissing on the Legacy (2008, Music Ration Entertainment)
- Coda (2010, Music Ration Entertainment)
- Death of the Format (2013, WTII)
- Hacked Vol. 2 (2016, Music Ration Entertainment)

=== EPs ===
- Stalemate (1994)
- Ultimatum EP 1.0 (1997)
- Shot (2011, Music Ration Entertainment)

=== Singles ===
- "Synthesia Murder Program" (1993, DoublePlusGood Productions)
- "Militia Love"/"Acid Drop" (2002)
- "No Space" (iammynewt – Studio X Remix) (2011)
