= Benedetto Coda =

Italian painter

Benedetto Coda (c. 1460 - 1535) was an Italian painter of the Renaissance active in Rimini. He is mainly known for his religious subjects.

Born in Treviso, Vasari claimed that Coda trained with Giovanni Bellini. He stayed for a brief period in Ferrara and settled in Rimini in the last decade of the 15th century. His works however have little in common with the Venetian School but lean rather towards the style of Francesco Raibolini, called Francesco Francia. There might also be possible Umbrian influences. His art is mannered and archaistic, but also meticulous and pleasing.

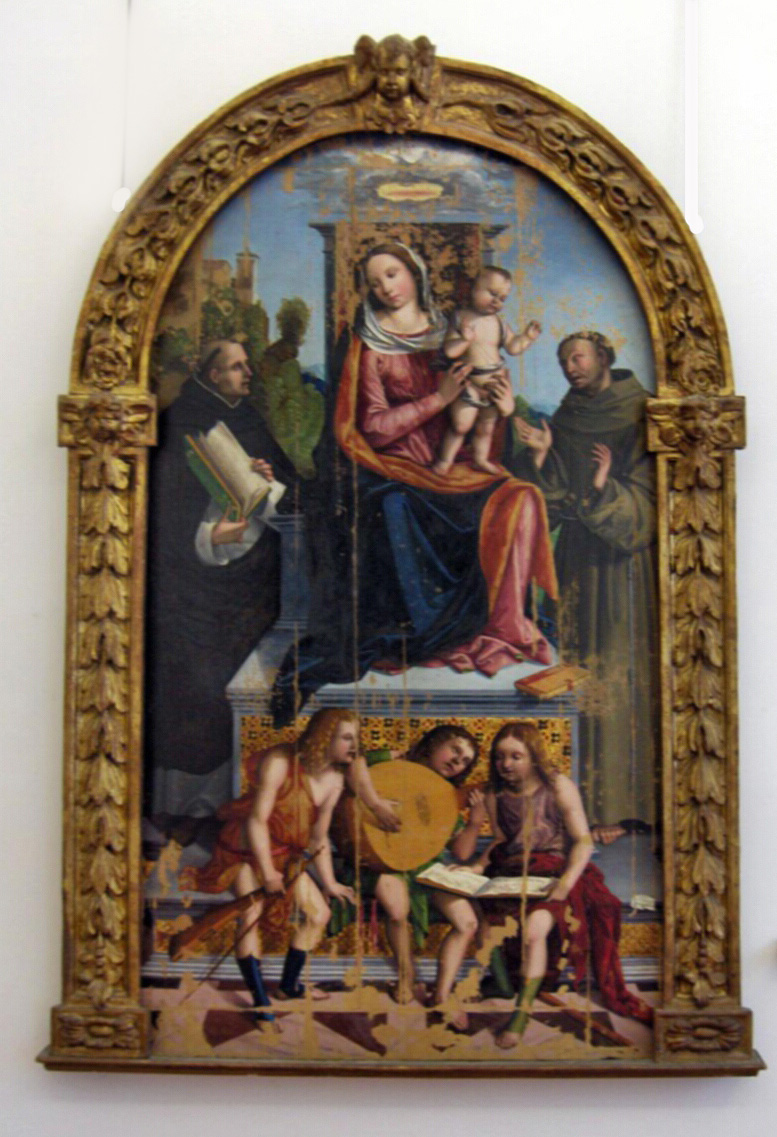
Madonna and Child, angels and saints City Museum, Rimini, Italy

Apart from his activity in Rimini, he also worked for several centres in Romagna and the Marche (Faenza, Ravenna, Cesena, Pennabilli, Pesaro and Urbino), in many cases, together with his sons (Bartolomeo, Francesco and Raffaele).

He was elected a member of the City Council. When he died in 1535, this office went to his son Bartolomeo, who was also a painter.

== Selected works ==
- Cesena, Fondazione Cassa di Risparmio
  - Hieronymus in a landscape.
- Riccione, Villa Franceschi
  - Mary with Child and St. John as a boy
- Rimini cathedral (originally)
  - Virgin Mary
- Warschau, Muzeum Narodowe
  - Mary with Child and Saints
- Painted for the Dominicans
  - Rosary
