= Cognitive discourse analysis =

Cognitive discourse analysis (CODA) is a research method which examines natural language data in order to gain insights into patterns in (verbalisable) thought. The term was coined by Thora Tenbrink to describe a kind of discourse analysis that had been carried out by researchers in linguistics and other fields. As it is limited to examining verbalisable thought, CODA studies are often triangulated against other research methods. The method is theoretically neutral (i.e. it does not rely on any particular model of language or cognition), and can therefore be used alongside a range of different models of cognition and grammar.

It is distinct from socio-cognitive discourse analysis, which is an analysis of the link between the text and structures in society.

== Methodology ==
Because of its use in different fields, the precise methodology can vary between papers. A broad outline is as follows:

1. Selection of research question. The research question must be centred on some aspect of verbalisable thought in order for CODA to be a suitable research method. This includes mental representations and complex cognitive processes.
2. Data collection. CODA is specifically for the analysis of natural language data. Because of that, it is important that questions be open-ended and not, for example, multiple-choice responses, though these are used alongside open-ended questions to get demographic information about participants.
3. Transcription and data cleaning. Data collected through means other than typed responses will need to be transcribed before analysis. Responses that did not address the question (e.g. one-word answers when a paragraph is called for) will need to be removed.
4. Analysis.
  1. Dividing the data into units. This is also known as segmentation. Segments can be at various levels of granularity, including coherent statements and individual responses to questions.
  2. Choosing the type of analysis. This can include a thematic analysis (a bottom-up extraction of themes from the text), or a content analysis. This analysis will lead to coding procedures for linguistic features in the text.
5. Reliability checking. The coding procedures should be laid out in such a way that a layman could follow them, which allows for reliability checking using an independent coder, as well as replication of the findings by other researchers.
6. Identification of relevant patterns. Patterns within the features identified during the analysis are identified here. For larger data sets, statistical procedures to identify patterns may be useful.
7. Triangulation with other research methods. CODA can be triangulated with other research methods from related fields, including psycholinguistics and cognitive psychology. Surface-level linguistic representation is insufficient for the analysis of many cognitive processes, so triangulation allows both for a deeper analysis and a check on the validity of the conclusions.

== Examples of use ==
=== Conceptual layers and strategies in tour planning ===
This 2011 paper examined spatial reasoning using a planning task and a verbal protocol. Participants were asked to design a tour based on a map showing locations of interest, then describe their process. The responses to the verbal protocol task were analysed using CODA. The analysis revealed that participants preferred circular trajectories with minimal crossed lines or detours.

=== The Language of Architectural Diagrams ===
In this 2019 paper, the authors used a thematic analysis and replicated the findings of previous papers which had identified that subject expertise changes thinking. Participants were shown pictures of architectural diagrams (initial sketches drawn by architects in the very first stage of designing buildings). Here they found that the participants' perception of the meaning of architectural diagrams was affected by their subject expertise. The two groups examined were architecture students and 'language' students. 'Language' students included those studying linguistics, modern languages, and literature.

=== Sculptors, Architects, and Painters Conceive of Depicted Spaces Differently ===
Published in 2018, this paper used CODA on descriptions of spatially complex pictures to reveal spatial conceptualisations. Participants were shown pictures of varying complexity (e.g. including 2D or 3D objects). The paper gathered data from sculptors, painters and artists on the basis that the three professions call for use of (and training in) spatial concepts. The authors found that participants from the three professions emphasised different areas of spatial cognition. Painters demonstrated both 2D and 3D concepts. Architects concentrated on paths and boundaries. Sculptors showed elements of both kinds of thinking.
