= Component detection algorithm =

The component detection algorithm (CODA) is a name for a type of LC-MS and chemometrics software algorithm focused on detecting peaks in noisy chromatograms (TIC) often obtained using the electrospray ionization technique.

The implementation of the algorithm from one piece of mass spectrometry software to another differs. Some implementations need clean chromatograms to substruct background.
