= Coda (SMP album) =

Studio album by SMP
- Released: November 2, 2010
- Genre: Industrial rock
- Length: 35:31
- Label: Music Ration Entertainment
- Producer: Wade Alin

SMP chronology
Pissing on the Legacy (2008)	Coda (2010)	Shot (2011)

Coda is the sixth studio album by SMP, released on November 2, 2010, by Music Ration Entertainment.

== Reception ==
Trubie Turner of ReGen gave Death of the Format a mostly positive review, saying "from the start, this definitely feels like a rejuvenated SMP, presenting a somewhat stripped down but purer blend of coldwave, industrial, hip-hop, and punk in that unmistakable style." Despite moderate criticism of the runtime, Turner concluded that the album is "full of attitude, intelligent biting lyrics, and infectious hip-hop inspired rhythm."

== Track listing ==
All tracks are written by Jason Bazinet, except "Run" by Chris Demarcus, Dee Madden and J. Ned Kirby and "Paid Vacation" by Greg Hetson, Lucky Lehrer, Keith Morris and Roger Rogerson.

No.	Title	Length
1.	"Stay Sick" (Album Mix)	4:28
2.	"Run"	3:55
3.	"The Knife"	4:50
4.	"Anna's Song"	5:09
5.	"Corporate Lunch"	5:48
6.	"Paid Vacation" (Circle Jerks cover)	5:14
7.	"No Space"	4:27
8.	"Stay Sick" (64K Mix)	1:40

== Personnel ==
Adapted from the Coda liner notes.

SMP

- Jason Bazinet – lead vocals, programming, drums (1, 6)

Additional performers

- Chris Demarcus – guitar and additional vocals (2)
- Juan Gomez – drums (2–5, 7)
- J. Ned Kirby – vocals (2)
- Dee Madden – vocals (2)
- Dan Miura – guitar (3–7)
- Michael Ostrander – programming, production and mixing (8)
- Rob Seaverns – guitar (1)
- Sam Wilder – bass guitar (6)

Production and design

- Wade Alin – production and mixing (1–7)
- Garrick Antikajian – cover art, illustrations, design
- Bryce Francis – recording

== Release history ==
Region	Date	Label	Format	Catalog
United States	2010	Music Ration Entertainment	CD	MRE104
