= Stalemate (SMP album) =

Studio album by SMP
- Released: May 1995
- Studio: Unisect Studio (Portland, OR)
- Genre: Industrial rock
- Length: 68:57
- Label: Re-Constriction
- Producer: A.P. Boone, Tim Farrow

SMP chronology
Stalemate (1994)	Stalemate (1995)	Ultimatum EP 1.0 (1997)

Alternative cover
- Digital issue

Stalemate is the debut studio album of SMP, released in May 1995 by Re-Constriction Records.

== Reception ==
Professional ratings
Review scores
Source	Rating
AllMusic	2.5/5 stars

John Bush of allmusic gave the Stalemate two and a half out of five stars and compared the music to My Life with the Thrill Kill Kult. Sonic Boom credited the duo with surpassing their contemporaries in meshing music styles, saying "the number of musicians that try to create music with this radical mixing of styles are few and far between [and] SMP outshine their brethren with a practiced ease." Aiding & Abetting also wrote positively of the album, saying "it may take a couple moments to really tap into what SMP is doing, but the sonic explosion in your mind will be well worth the effort." Trubie Turner of ReGen said the album captures the band at their "raw and intense best" and called Stalemate "bristling with attitude and a unique infusion of hip-hop style with subtle punk overtones."

== Track listing ==
All tracks are written by Jason Bazinet and Sean Setterberg, except "Lethal Weapon" by Afrika Islam and Ice-T.

No.	Title	Length
1.	"Pure Uncut Anger"	5:12
2.	"Drug Czar"	4:55
3.	"451"	4:37
4.	"Alcohol Part One"	4:20
5.	"Lethal Weapon" (Ice-T cover)	5:10
6.	"Clementine"	4:35
7.	"Scarlet Letter Part One"	2:12
8.	"Scarlet Letter Part Two"	3:57
9.	"Cops"	6:09
10.	"1999"	5:53
11.	"Backwards"	4:38
12.	"Homeless"	4:38
13.	"Punch"	6:03
14.	"We've Got a Problem"	4:16
15.	"Christmas at the Pub"	2:19

== Personnel ==
Adapted from the Stalemate liner notes.

SMP

- Jason Bazinet – lead vocals, mixing
- Sean Setterberg (as Sean Ivy) – mixing

Production and design

- A.P. Boone – production, engineering, mixing
- Tim Farrow – turntables, production, engineering, mixing
- Charles Holzer – engineering
- Corinna Nye – photography
- Eric Powell – cover art, design

== Release history ==
Region	Date	Label	Format	Catalog
United States	1995	Re-Constriction	CD	REC-014
United States	2011	Music Ration Entertainment	DL	
