= Doll Factory =

American electronic rock/post-punk band

- Origin: Seattle, Washington, U.S.
- Genres: Electronic rock, post-punk revival, alternative rock, dance-punk, industrial
- Years active: 1998—present
- Labels: Neue Ästhetik Multimedia (2000–2006); NPS Media (2007–)
- Members: Garrick Antikajian, Chris Roy
- Past members: Mars Saxman (live keyboards); Jason Bazinet (live drums); Matt Frickelton (live bass); Marc Alex Ryan (live guitars); V. Scott Parker (live drums)
- Website: dollfactory.org

Doll Factory is an American electronic rock/post-punk revival band from Seattle, Washington, United States. Founded in 1998 (after working together under various names including "Crown of Thorns", "Guernica", "Micronism", and others) by musicians Garrick Antikajian and Chris Roy, the band primarily works as a studio-based duo with Antikajian and Roy handling all writing, performance, and production duties, with additional musicians added to the lineup for live performances.

== History ==
Antikajian and Roy first met as junior high school students, originally recording 4-track cassette portastudio demos in Eugene, Oregon and Junction City, Oregon as "Crown of Thorns" and later, "Guernica". Performing regionally at such venues as Portland, Oregon's X-Ray Cafe and Eugene, Oregon's W.O.W. Hall throughout their high school and college years, the duo recorded at Antikajian's 16-track home studio, releasing several demos and a self-released cassette, "Multichrome Universe", before Antikajian's departure, due to creative differences, in 1992. Roy and the remaining members of "Guernica" moved to Seattle, Washington in 1993, where the band performed a single show before breaking up.

Following the breakup of "Guernica", Antikajian and Roy began to correspond, mailing demo tapes of their respective solo material between Roy's home in Seattle, Washington and Antikajian's project studio in Rancho Cucamonga, California, resulting in Antikajian's eventual move to Seattle to collaborate on new material. Eventually settling on the name "Doll Factory", the duo recorded the self-released "Premonition EP" in 1999, resulting in several compilation album and remix appearances, and attracting the attention of Neue Ästhetik Multimedia, an independent record label known for releases from Faith and the Muse, Jane Jensen (musician), and Das Ich.

Releasing "Weightless" in 2003, Doll Factory parted ways with Neue Ästhetik after the label fell victim to changes in the music industry – particularly the bankruptcy proceedings of Tower Records and their subsidiary, Bayside Distribution, who held the majority of existing copies of "Weightless" at the time.

After a hiatus while Antikajian was living in New York City, the band began work on a new release, tentatively expected to be released in 2010. However, this project was never released.

"Weightless, "Premonition E.P.," and a single version of the band’s cover of "…Baby One More Time" were made digitally available in 2016.

== Musical style ==
Called a "mix of Industrial rock, goth, electronica, and a slight touch of experimentalism" and "industrial rock with creative electronics" with "an electroclash-ish edge" in magazine reviews of "Weightless", the band claims to be moving toward a sound that is "more new wave, post punk, or indie electronic rock and not so specifically goth or industrial", citing "current favorites such as The Faint, Interpol, Editors, Muse, Alpinestars, LCD Soundsystem, Ladytron, Fischerspooner, orchestral music, and Eastern-influenced artists like Niyaz, Silk Road Ensemble, Talvin Singh, Natacha Atlas, and Bollywood film soundtracks".

== Band members ==
- Garrick Antikajian – vocals, keyboards, guitar, percussion, songwriting, programming, production
- Chris Roy – vocals, guitar, bass guitar, keyboards, electric violin, percussion, songwriting, programming, production

=== Additional musicians ===
- Jason Bazinet – live drums, vocals (2001–present)

Bazinet performed live drums on "Weightless"-era concert appearances, as well as contributing acoustic drums to several tracks on "Weightless", "Artifacts", and guest vocals on the song "We Are The Hollow Men".
Bazinet is the founding member of Sounds of Mass Production, and a collaborator with Antikajian in the side project, "The Loyal Opposition".

- Mars Saxman – live keyboards, synthesizers, electronic instruments, vocals (2003–present)

Saxman performed live keyboards and electronics on "Weightless"-era concert appearances, as well as contributing guest vocals on the song "We Are The Hollow Men".

- Matt Frickelton – live bass guitar, vocals (1998–1999)
- Marc Alex Ryan – live electric guitar, vocals (1998–1999)
- V. Scott "Scotty" Parker – live drums, electronic percussion (1998–1999)

== Other information ==
- Both Roy and Antikajian on keyboards, guitar and percussion have performed – at separate times – as members of the live lineup of Sounds of Mass Production, with Roy appearing as session guitarist and Antikajian as producer on later SMP recordings. Bazinet has appeared as a live musician and on various Doll Factory recordings.
- Both Antikajian and Roy are sons of visual artists; Antikajian's father is the painter Sarkis Antikajian, and Roy is the son of a University of Oregon art professor and a textile artist.
- The band embraces an "indie" or "DIY" aesthetic, handling everything from audio and video production and graphic design to repairing and modifying their own equipment, both out of a desire for artistic control and out of economic necessity.
- The band makes use of novel instrumentation in their recordings, often extensively processed with hardware and software audio effects, such as toy piano, erhu, duduk, kalimba, found object percussion such as bags of frozen vegetables, washing machines, and scrap metal, educational toys such as the Talking Computron and Baby LeapFrog, various iPhone apps, speech synthesis software, and the Bleep Labs Thingamagoop, a variant on the 'optical theremin'.

== Discography ==
=== Albums ===
- Premonition EP (1999)
- Weightless (2003)
- 'Artifacts' (Working title) (c. 2010)

=== Compilation appearances ===
- Various Artists: Syncromesh 001
- Various Artists: Syncromesh 002
- Various Artists: Unquiet Grave III
- Various Artists: Tribute to Marilyn Manson
- Various Artists: The Nature of Gothic
- Various Artists: Teen Feeding Frenzy
- Various Artists: Eighteen

=== Remixes ===
- Sounds of Mass Production: Megaton
- Sounds of Mass Production: Chemicals
- Idiot Stare: Ghost
