= Crimes of the Future (album) =

Studio album by SMP
- Released: April 19, 2004
- Recorded: Seattle, WA
- Genre: Industrial rock
- Length: 56:14
- Label: Music Ration Entertainment

SMP chronology
Hacked (2002)	Crimes of the Future (2004)	The Treatment (2007)

Crimes of the Future is the fourth studio album by SMP, released on April 19, 2004 by Music Ration Entertainment.

== Reception ==
DJ Arcanus of Lollipop Magazine called Crimes of the Future the band's greatest achievement, calling it "danceable, aggressive, diverse, and complex" and "nearly every song is an intense and effective punch in the gut."

== Track listing ==
All tracks are written by Jason Bazinet.

No.	Title	Length
1.	"This Perfect Day"	3:52
2.	"Beautiful"	3:02
3.	"Three O'Clock"	3:36
4.	"Trip"	3:26
5.	"Retro Human"	4:33
6.	"X"	4:49
7.	"Corporate Culture"	3:55
8.	"Slag"	3:38
9.	"Bloodstains"	1:38
10.	"I'm Tired of Life"	1:55
11.	"Food Slot"	4:29
12.	"The Cage"	3:52
13.	"24 Hours"	4:13
14.	"Exit Wound"	2:13
15.	"Hacker Like Me"	3:47
16.	"Soylent Green"	3:14

== Personnel ==
Adapted from the Crimes of the Future liner notes.

SMP

- Jason Bazinet – lead vocals, drums, programming

Additional performers

- Wade Alin – additional programming, mixing (1–6, 8–10, 12, 14)
- Paul J. Furio – programming, additional keyboards, additional vocals and mixing (15)
- Dee Madden – additional vocals (16)
- Chris Roy – guitar (1, 2, 3, 6, 9, 10)

Production and design

- Rob Anonymous – recording (1–6, 8 to 10, 12, 14)
- Garrick Antikajian – cover art, illustrations, design, mixing and additional programming (7, 11, 13)
- Roger Sprague – mastering
- The Sultan – mixing (16)

== Release history ==
Region	Date	Label	Format	Catalog
United States	2004	Music Ration Entertainment	CD	MRE101
