= Gridlock (disambiguation) =

Gridlock is the inability to move on a transport network.

Gridlock may also refer to:

- Gridlock (politics), a situation when the government is unable to act or pass laws because rival parties control different parts of the executive branch and the legislature.
- Gridlock (novel), a novel by Ben Elton
- Gridlock (band), an electronic music band
- Gridlock (game show), a 1990s game show in Ireland
- Gridlock (comics), a supervillain from DC Comics
- "Gridlock", a song by The Pogues from the album Peace and Love
- "Gridlock", a song by Anthrax from the album Persistence of Time
- "Gridlock!", a song by Electric Six from the album Heartbeats and Brainwaves
- Gridlock, a 1996 TV movie starring David Hasselhoff
- Gridlock'd, a 1997 film
- "Gridlock" (Doctor Who), an episode of Doctor Who
- "Gridlock", a music video by Angry Kid
- Gridlock (film), a 1980 film
- Gridlock!, a pricing game on the game show The Price Is Right
