= Stalemate (EP) =

EP by SMP
- Released: 1994
- Studio: Various: dA Garage Studios; Sound Sound; (Milwaukee, Wisconsin)
- Genre: Industrial rock
- Producers: Jason Bazinet; T. Fallet; D.A. Sebasstian; Sean Setterberg

SMP chronology
Stalemate (1994)	Stalemate (1995)

Alternative cover
- 2016 reissue cover

Stalemate is the debut EP of SMP, self-released in 1994. The album was remastered by Chris Demarcus and re-released in 2016. The titletrack was provided to If It Moves... for their 1994 compilation Scavengers in the Matrix.

== Track listing ==
All tracks are written by Jason Bazinet and Sean Setterberg.

Side one
No.	Title	Length
1.	"Scarlet Letter"
2.	"We've Got a Problem"
3.	"Divided"

Side two
No.	Title	Length
1.	"Stalemate"
2.	"Cops"
3.	"Wasted"

Remastered digital reissue
No.	Title	Length
1.	"Scarlet Letter" (Demo Mix)	3:49
2.	"We've Got a Problem" (Demo Mix)	4:12
3.	"Divided"	5:34
4.	"Stalemate"	6:01
5.	"Cops" (Demo Mix)	6:02
6.	"Wasted"	7:09
7.	"Wasted" (Instrumental Mix)	6:59

== Personnel ==
Adapted from the Stalemate liner notes.

SMP

- Jason Bazinet – lead vocals, production, engineering
- Sean Setterberg (as Sean Ivy) – instruments, production, engineering

Additional performers

- Mike Ditmore – drums (A1-A3, B1, B2)

Production and design

- T. Fallet – production, recording, mixing and engineering(B3)
- D.A. Sebasstian – production, recording, mixing and engineering (A1-A3, B1, B2)

== Release history ==
Region	Date	Format
United States	1994	CS
United States	2016	DL
