= Koda Dam =

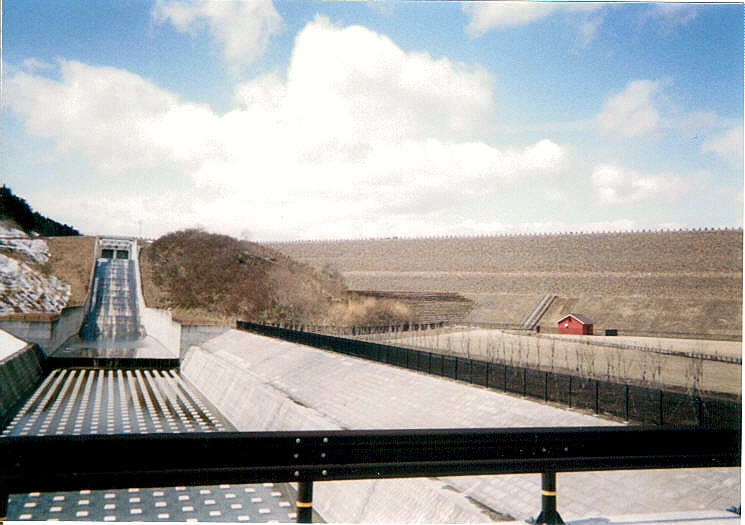

- Location within Japan
- Location: Kurihara, Miyagi, Japan
- Coordinates: 38°45′18″N 140°50′21″E
- Construction began: 1974
- Opening date: 2005

Dam and spillways
- Type of dam: Rockfill dam
- Height: 43.5 m (143 ft)
- Length: 520 m (1,710 ft)
- Dam volume: 1,341,000 m^{3}

Reservoir
- Total capacity: 9,720,000 m^{3}
- Catchment area: 23.4 km^{2}
- Surface area: 81 ha

Koda Dam (小田ダム, Koda damu) is a dam on the Nagasaki River in Kurihara, Miyagi Prefecture, Japan, completed in 2005.
