= CODA Content Delivery Architecture =

Digital signage product and platform

CODA Content Delivery Architecture, from Cambridge Visual Networks (Camvine), is both a digital signage product and a platform. The product is a media player with a ‘drag and drop’ web-based content management system. As a platform, CODA is a customisable system for partners to tailor solutions for different applications.

Content sources supported include images, video in various formats, Flash, PowerPoint, PDFs, web pages, calendars and web cams. It also connects to real-time information such as RSS news, weather and traffic information, as well as social media and business applications.

CODA is used by businesses, schools, retail stores and media networks to create their own playlists and run their own communication channels.
