= Bartolomeo Coda =

Italian painter (fl.1543)

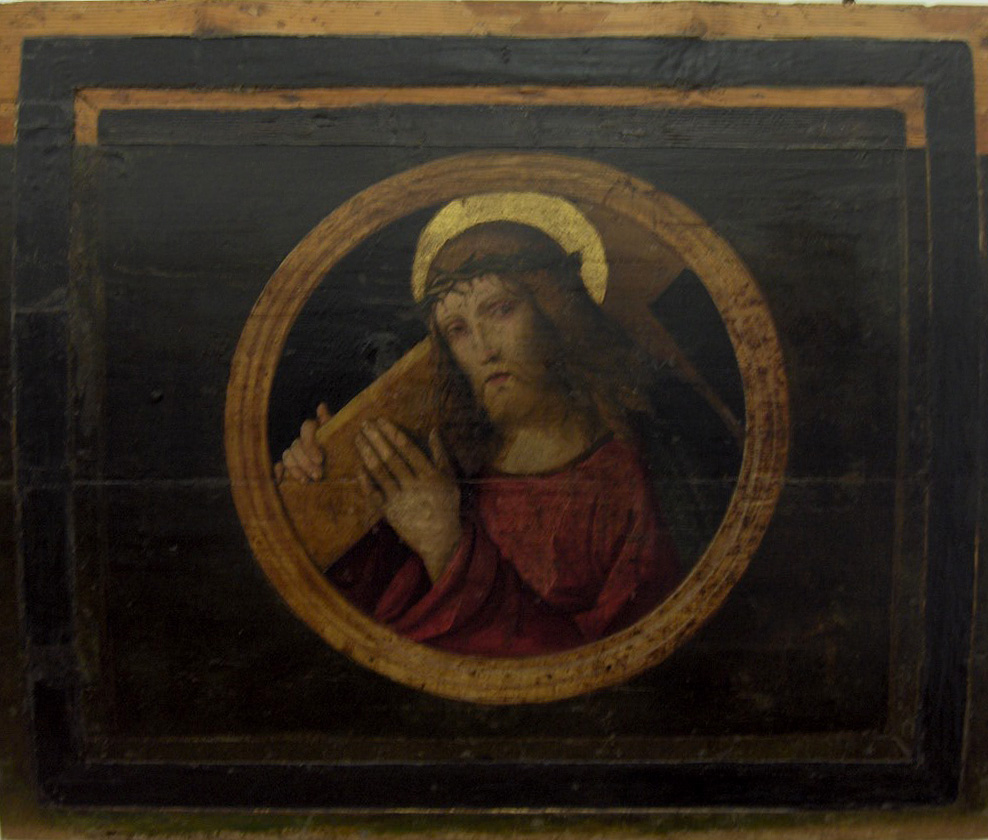
Christ with the H. Cross by Bartolomeo Coda (1490–1565) (?) or by Giovan Battista Bertucci il Vecchio (1465–1516) (?). Now in the City Museum of Rimini.

Bartolomeo Coda (or Codi) flourished about the year 1543. He was called Da Rimini, as was also his elder brother Francesco, who painted in 1533. He was instructed in the art by his father, Benedetto, whom he surpassed. In the church of San Rocco at Pesaro, was a fine picture by this master, bearing the above date; which Lanzi says in every respect bears the character of the golden age of the art. It represents the Virgin and Infant enthroned, with a Choir of beautiful Cherubs, and with St. Roch and St. Sebastian. However, this painting no longer exists. It was painted for the Confraternita San Rocco and San Sebastiano in Pesaro but by 1821 was in the hands of Edward Solly, an art dealer in Berlin. He sold it to the Berlin art gallery (now the Gemäldergalerie) who believe that it was probably destroyed in May 1945 in the control tower of the flak bunker in Berlin's Friedrichshain.
