= Karl Ludwig Friedrich Hetsch =

German songwriter

Karl Ludwig Friedrich Hetsch (or Louis Hetsch; 1808-1872) was a German songwriter. His modestly forgettable songs include Louange de la Havane.
