= Kōda River (Aichi) =

River of Aichi, Japan

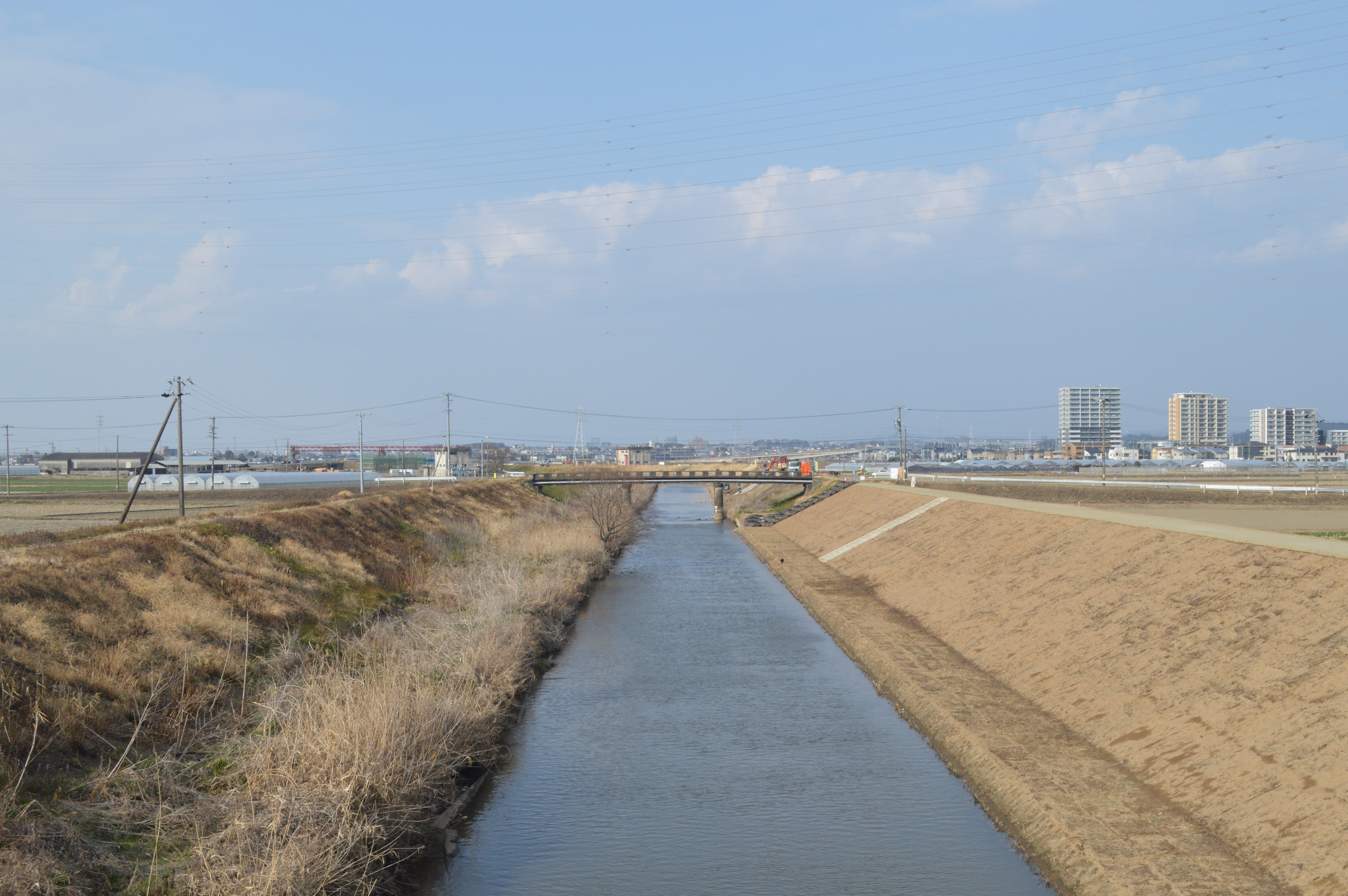

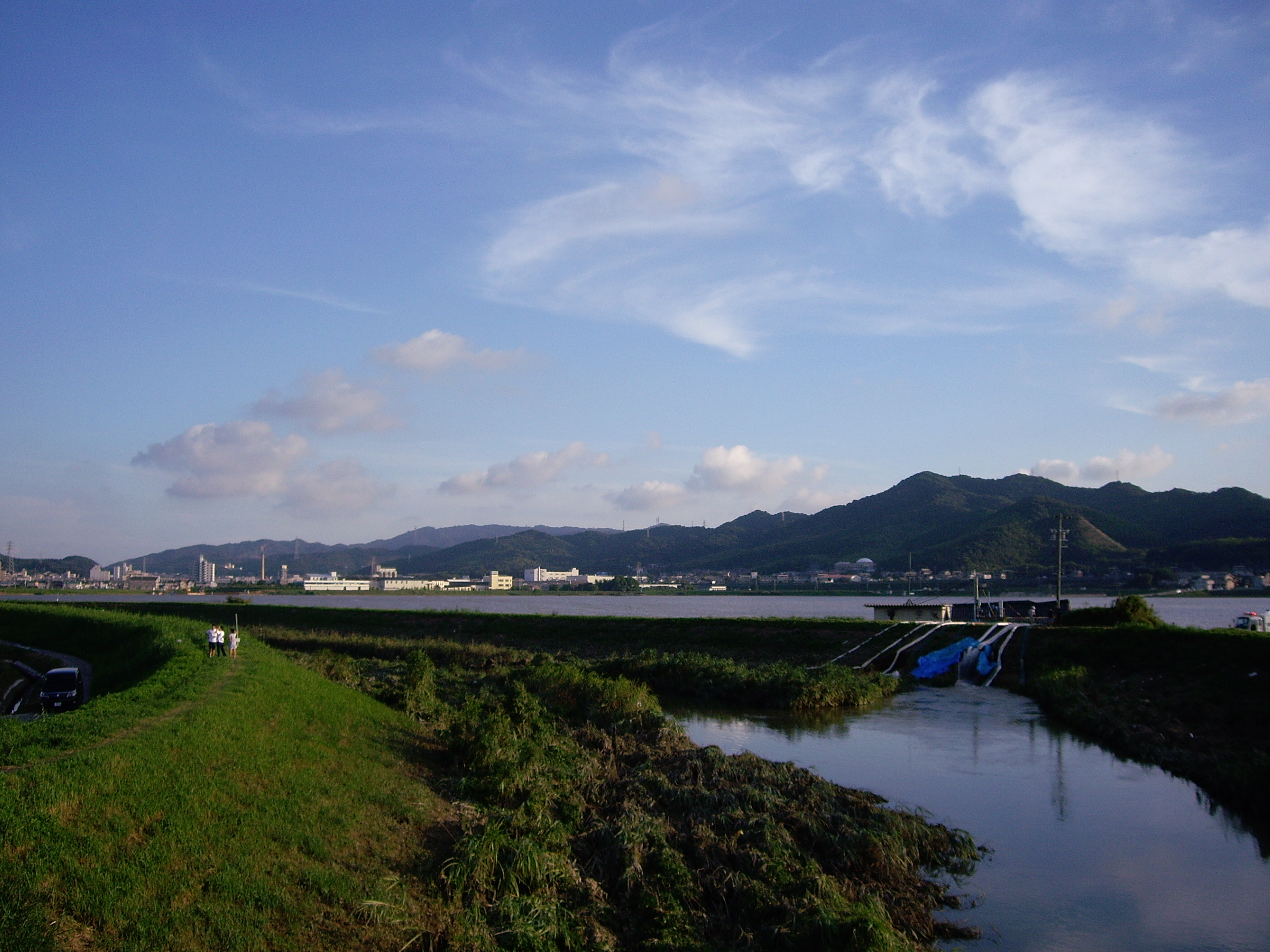
The Kōda river at Hishiike, Kōta.

Kōda (広田川, コウダガワ, Kōda-gawa) is a small river in the towns of Kōta and Nishio in Aichi Prefecture, Japan.

The Kōda river starts in Kōta about 4 km southwest of the town hall, makes a broad loop through Kōta and Nishio (towards east, north, west, and southwest), runs alongside the Yahagifuru River in Nishio for about 6 km, and finally joins it at about 34.802518°N 137.049209°E.

The town changed its name from Kōda (広田) to Kōta (幸田) in 1954, and for that reason, the river is sometimes called Kōta too. The transliterations as Koda, Kouda, Kota, or Kouta may also occur, with or without the Japanese suffix gawa ("river"). Moreover, the kanji 広田 can also be read as Hirota, and this misreading seems to be commonly made by automatic translators.
