= Kōda River (Kōchi) =

River in Kōchi City, Japan

Coordinates: 33.553100°N 133.526971°E

The Kōda (神田川, こうだがわ, kōdagawa) or Koda is a second class river in Kōchi City, Kōchi Prefecture It is a tributary on the right (south) side of the Kagami River (鏡川).

The characters 神田川 can be read in many ways, including "Kanda River" (かんだがわ, kandagawa), and that is how the river is named on some English sources.

== Course ==
The Kōda river is about 6.05 km long. It originates in a hilly area (100 to 200 m above sea level) and travels east while being joined by the rivers Yoshino (or Takaza) (高座川), Ebi (海老川), Sancho (三所川), Isobe (鴨部川), and Hino (辰ノ尾川). Most of its course is now channeled and runs through fully urbanized areas. It finally merges with the Kagami River, about 1 km southwest of the Kōchi Castle, which, after another 4 km, flows into Urato (Urado) Bay, a small branch of Tosa Bay. The backswamp, which accounts for the majority of the river's drainage basin, was mostly wetland until the end of World War II, but it has since become a residential area.
