= Koda River (D. R. Congo) =

River in the Democratic Republic of the Congo

The Koda is a river in the Djugu Territory, Ituri province, Democratic Republic of the Congo. The name is also spelled Kodda or Kodha.

== Course ==
The river starts in the Lendu Plateau northwest of Lake Albert, in the farmlands south and southwest of Kpandroma, at an altitude of about 2050 m. It initially runs a fairly level course in the general south direction, about 4 km east of Mount Aboro (the highest peak in the plateau). Near 2.0010°N 30.9042°E, at about 2000 m altitude, it starts running down the steep slope of the plateau in the direction of Lake Albert. It is the spine of the Bai valley, about 5 km long and 1.5 km wide, that ends at about 1050 m of altitude.

Shortly after the edge of the plateau, at about 2.000537°N 30.904348°E, the river splits into two branches that run about 20 m apart and rejoin 90 m further downstream, forming an oblong island. A little further down, at about 2.0000°N 30.9095°E, it is blocked by a small dam, at a place formerly called the Buu Falls.

== Fauna and flora ==
Along its descent down the slope of the plateau, the river runs through the Tsili forest, that spans across the Bai (Koda River) valley and the adjacent Ndoogo valley to the east. As of 2016, this forest was about 2 km long, centered near 1.996276°N 30.916961°E, at about 1500 m of altitude and about 1.5 km north of the village Ndeke3. It is a small relic of the climax tropical forest that once covered the plateau and its slopes. The region, and a few more forest patches to its southwest, are one of the last refuges of a subspecies of chimpanzee, Pan troglodytes schweinfurthii. At least six other non-human primate species have been reported in the region.
