= River View with Rocks =

Painting by Paul Bril

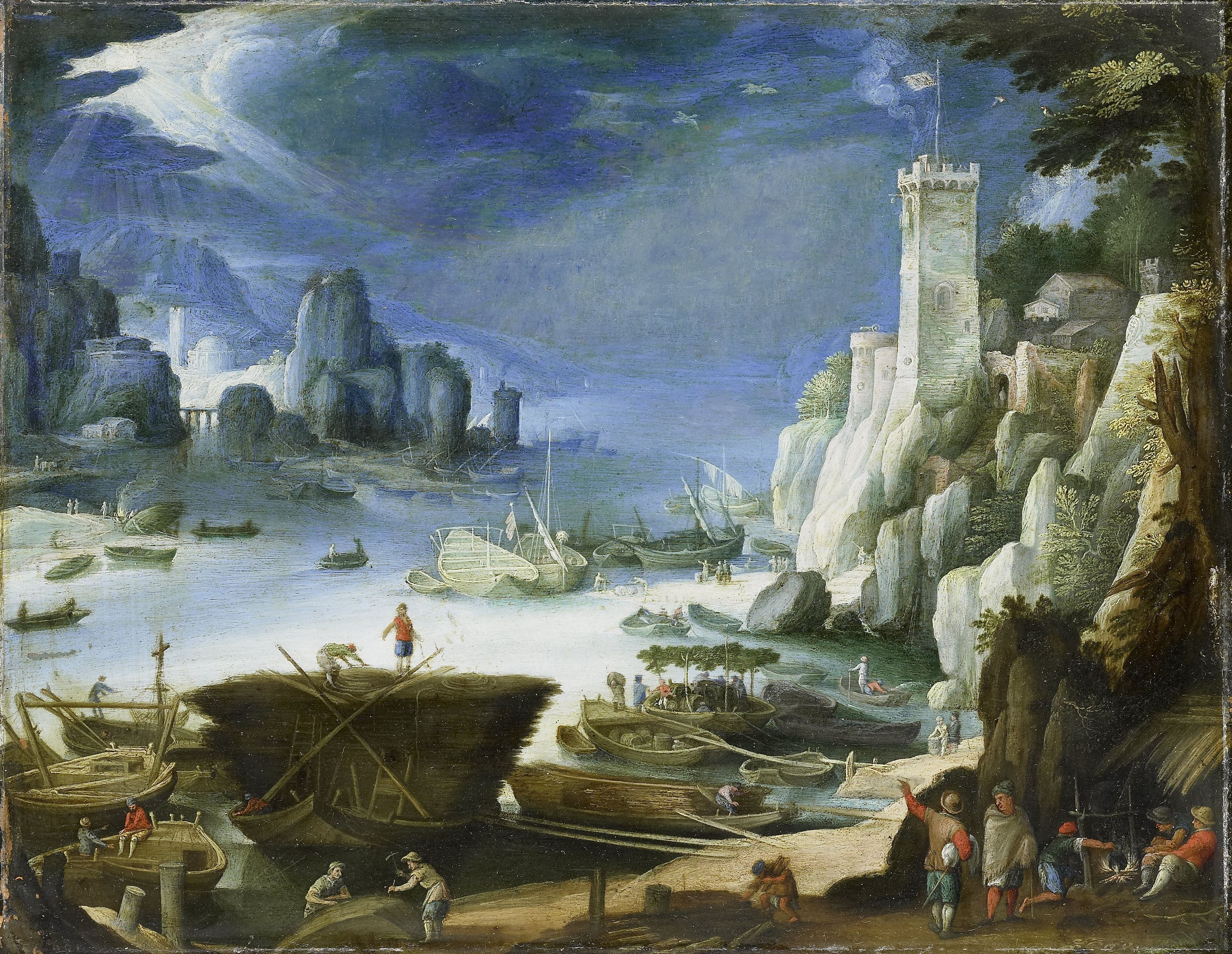
- Artist: Unknown, after Paul Bril
- Year: 1601
- Catalogue: SK-A-1314
- Medium: Oil on copper
- Dimensions: 23 cm × 29 cm (9 in × 11.4 in)
- Location: Rijksmuseum; Amsterdam

River View with Rocks is an oil on copper anonymous copy of an original painting by Flemish painter Paul Bril. The copy of the original painting is currently housed at the Rijksmuseum in Amsterdam. The painting was acquired by the Rijksmuseum in 1885.

== Bibliography ==
- Maier-Preusker 1991, p. 37, note 2; p. 73
- PJJ van Thiel, All the paintings of the Rijksmuseum in Amsterdam, Amsterdam (Rijksmuseum) 1976, p. 151, no. 1314, as a copy after P. Bril
