= Church of the Servi, Cesena =

Roman Catholic church in Emilia-Romagna, Italy

Coordinates: 44°08′11″N 12°14′52″E

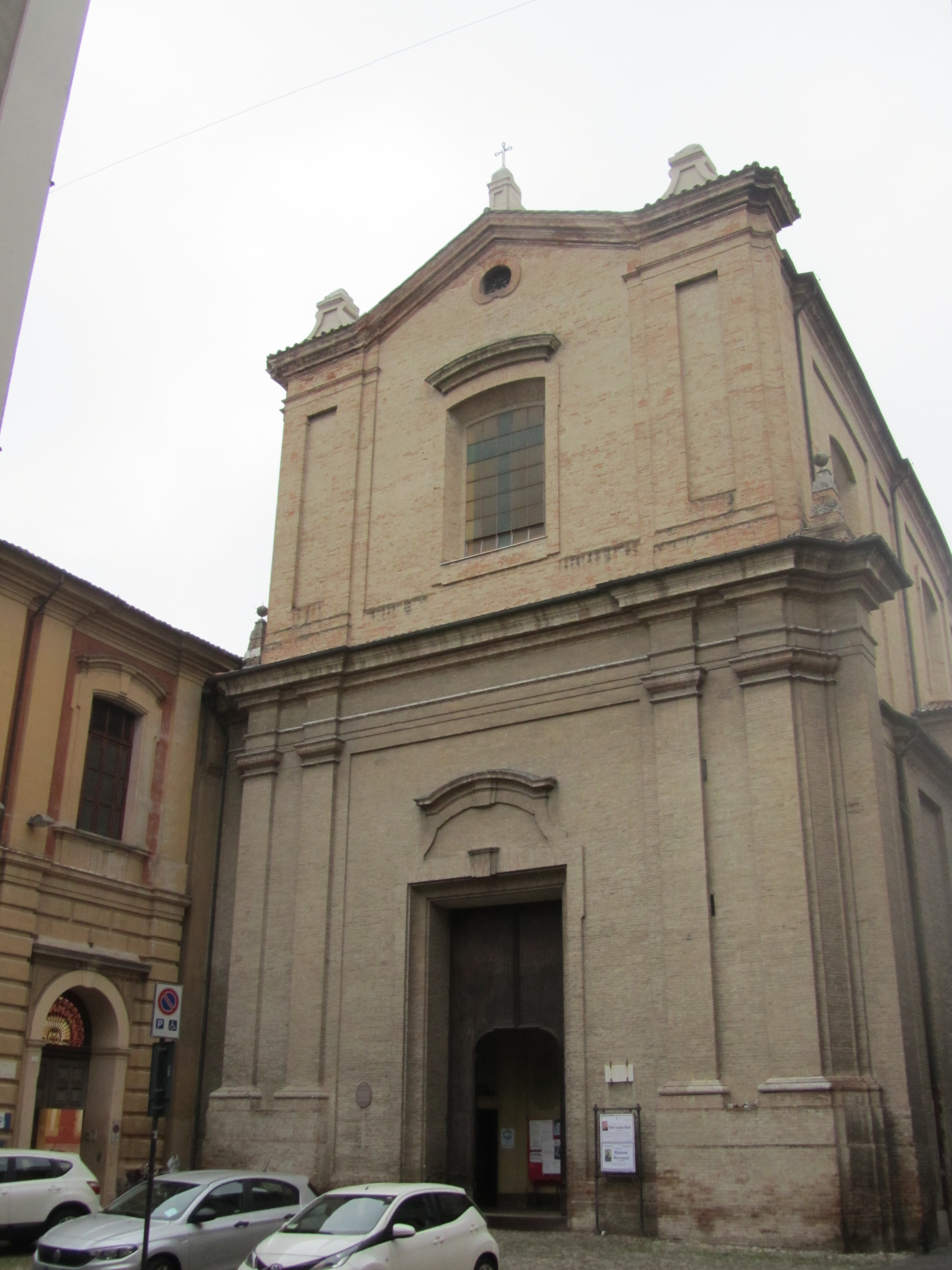
Chiesadeiservi.jpg

The Church of the Servi, also called the Santuario dell'Addolorata, is a Roman Catholic church located in Corso Giuseppe Garibaldi #27, near the town center of Cesena, region of Emilia-Romagna, Italy.

== History ==
A church at the site was erected in 1300, after plague decimated the neighborhood. In 1403, this church was nearly destroyed by an earthquake, and rebuilt at public expense. In 1756, the church was rebuilt anew by the Servite Order, using a design by the architect Pietro Carlo Borboni. The sober brick facade has doric columns. Work was completed by 1765.

The interior had an altarpiece depicting Carlo Borromeo tending to those afflicted with Plague by Carlo Saraceni. In addition, the church has remnants of 15th and 16th-century frescoes. It also houses an Annunciation (17th century) by Livio Modigliani. The church houses large wooden altarpiece with the 17th-century sculptures of the Vergine Addolorata (Virgin in Grief) with the dead Christ, a theme endeared to the Servites.
