= Pietro Carlo Borboni =

Pietro Carlo Borboni (1720–1773) was a Swiss architect, active in a late Baroque style, known for his works in Cesena, region of Emilia-Romagna, Italy. He also worked in Savignano sul Rubicone.

He was born in Lugano in the Ticino, and the details of his early life and training are unknown. He is listed as architetto municipale (municipal architect) in documents of Cesena, where he lived from 1743 to his death.

== Works ==
Among the many works he completed locally were:

- Reconstruction (1764) of the new church of San Zenone, Cesena
- Ponte San Clemente over the River Savio
- Pescheria of Cesena
- Chapel of the Madonna del Popolo (1679) for the Cesena Cathedral
- Dome of Sanctuary of Maria del Monte, Cesena
- Church of the Servi, Cesena
