= St Jerome (after Palma Giovane) =

1600s oil painting on copper

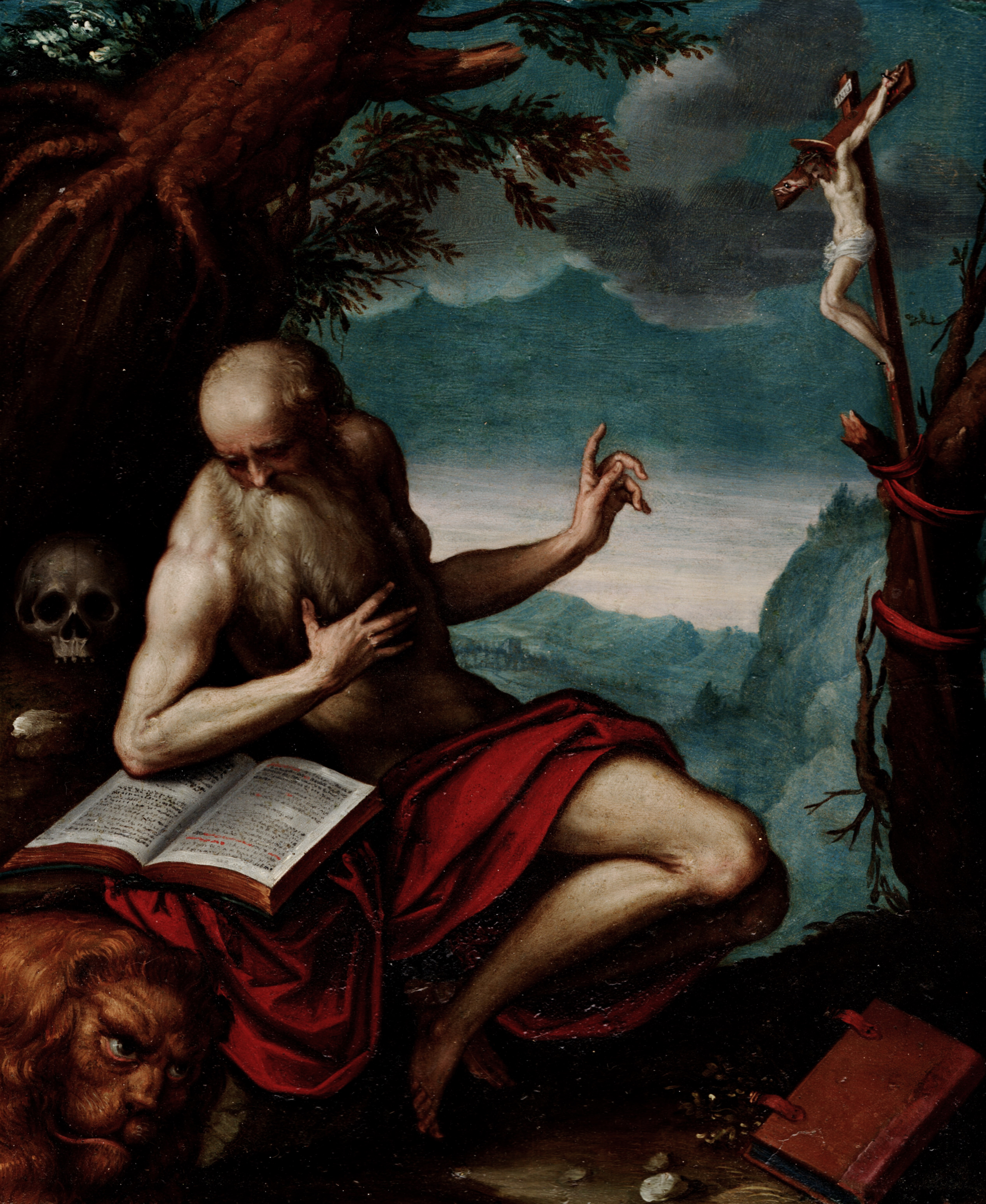
The Francesco St Jerome

A copy of a lost St Jerome, in oils on copper, is attributed to the circle of the Italian Renaissance artist Palma the Younger, dated to the early 17th century. It is in a private collection. It measures 26.3 x 22.2 cm.

The painting was believed to possibly be the lost original work by Palma when it was rediscovered in January 2008 and became known to the public upon its featuring in a number of newspapers in the United Kingdom and around the world.

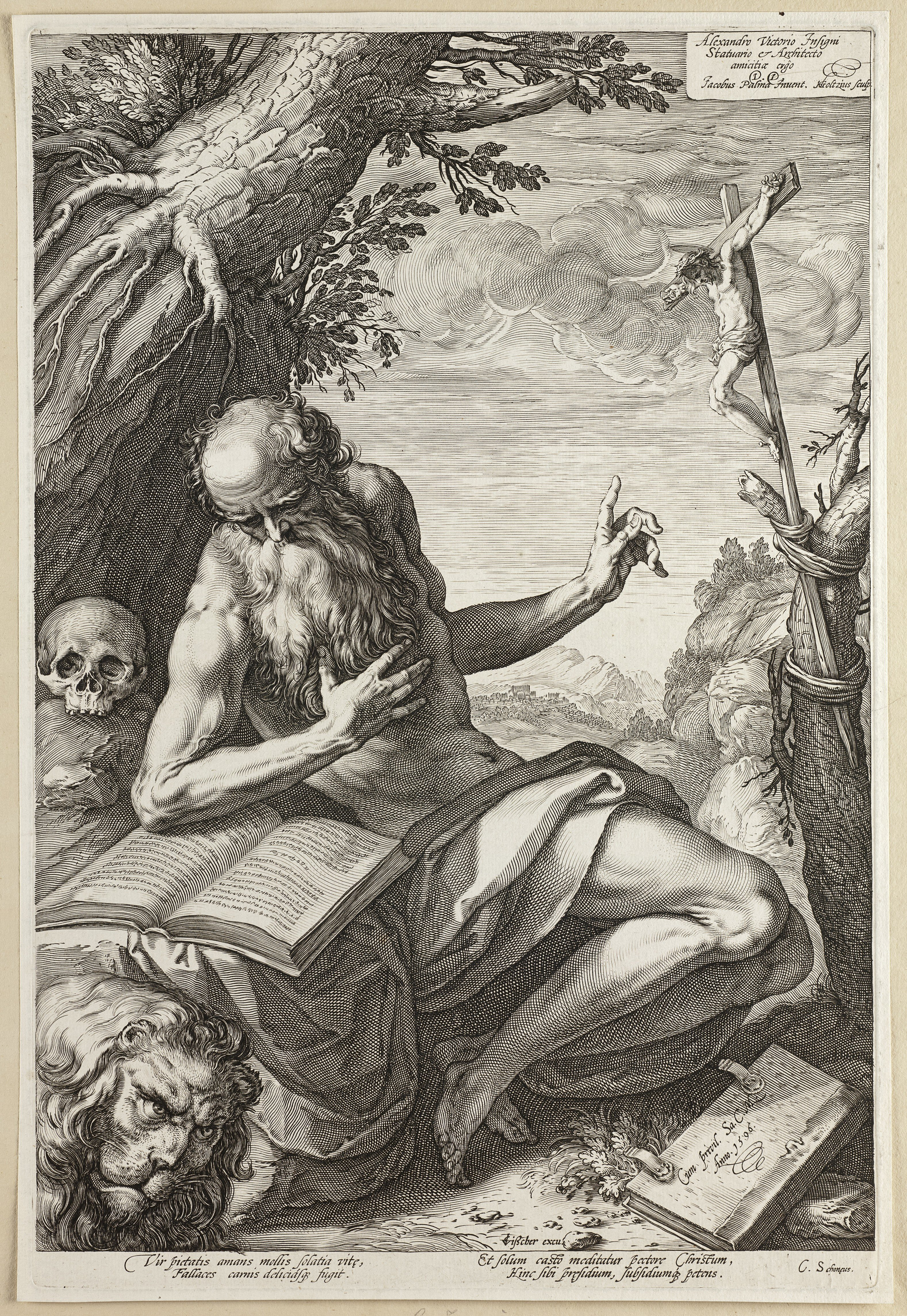
The engraving by Hendrik Goltzius, 1596, 418 × 278 mm

It is sometimes called the Francesco St Jerome, after Palma's patron, Francesco Maria II della Rovere, Duke of Urbino. According to Carlo Ridolfi's 17th century biography of Palms, the Duke commissioned the original painting of the composition, which is now lost, although several other Palma paintings of Jerome have survived. This however is the finest and closest example to engravings of the lost original.

After its discovery, the painting was loaned for two years to The Courtauld Institute in London as a teaching aid to students. Offering for academic study a rare surviving example of copper painting from the period, This included extensive research and restoration in an attempt to ascertain its authorship.

The painting dates from the height of Palma's fame and artistic ability and was most likely created by one of his students or a pupil in the workshop of Hendrik Goltzius, who produced an engraving of the composition, dated 1596. The painting follows the engraving very closely in most respects. The painting has fine detail and vividly bright colours; paintings on copper often retain their brightness and condition better than those on canvas. The work is currently in the collection of the Redingensian, an independent museum in Berkshire, UK.
