= Carlo Saraceni =

Italian painter (1579–1620)

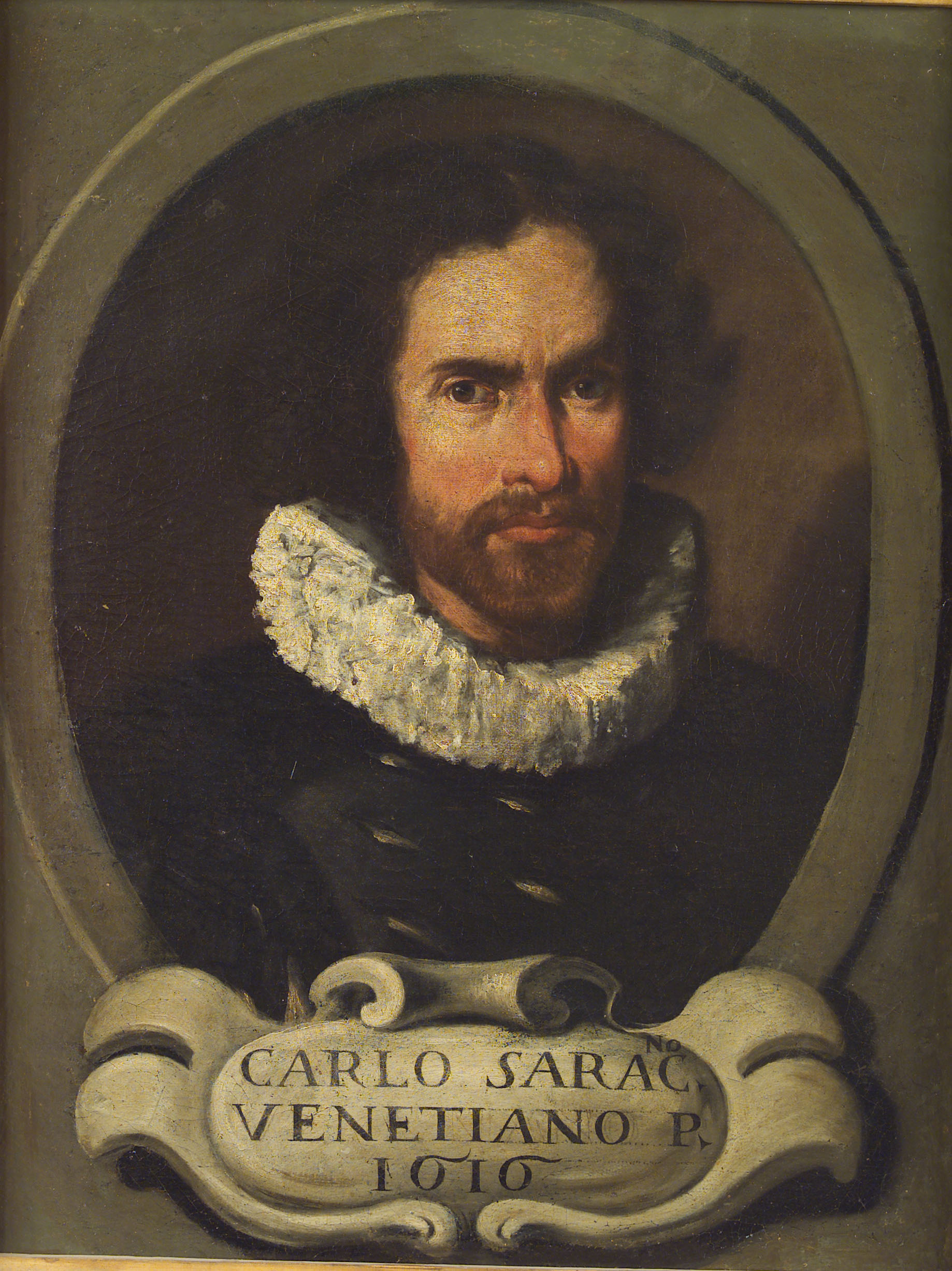
- Anonymous, Portrait of Carlo Saraceni (1616)
- Born: 1579; Venice, Republic of Venice
- Died: 16 June 1620 (aged 40–41); Venice, Republic of Venice
- Movement: Baroque

Carlo Saraceni (1579 – 16 June 1620) was an Italian early-Baroque painter, whose reputation as a "first-class painter of the second rank" was improved with the publication of a modern monograph in 1968.

== Life ==
Though he was born and died in Venice, his paintings are distinctly Roman in style; he moved to Rome in 1598, joining the Accademia di San Luca in 1607. He never visited France, though he spoke fluent French and had French followers and a French wardrobe. His painting, however, was influenced at first by the densely forested, luxuriantly enveloping landscape settings for human figures of Adam Elsheimer, a German painter resident in Rome; "there are few landscapes by Saraceni which have not been attributed to Elsheimer," Malcolm Waddingham observed, and Anna Ottani Cavina has suggested the influences may have travelled both ways. and Elsheimer's small cabinet paintings on copper offered a format that Saraceni employed in six landscape panels illustrating The Flight of Icarus; in Moses and the Daughters of Jethro, and Mars and Venus.

When Caravaggio's notorious Death of the Virgin was rejected in 1606 as an altarpiece suitable for a chapel of Santa Maria della Scala, it was Saraceni who provided the acceptable substitute, which remains in situ, the only securely dated painting of his first decade in Rome. He was influenced by Caravaggio's dramatic lighting, monumental figures, naturalistic detail, and momentary action, so that he is numbered among the first of the "tenebrists" or "Caravaggisti". Examples of this style can be seen in the candlelit Judith with the Head of Holofernes.

Saraceni's style matured rapidly between 1606 and 1610, and the next decade gave way to his fully mature works, synthesizing Caravaggio and the Venetians. In 1616–17 he collaborated on the frescoes for the Sala Regia of the Palazzo del Quirinale. In 1618 he received payment for two paintings in the church of Santa Maria dell'Anima. The compositional details of his fresco of The Birth of the Virgin in the Chapel of the Annunciation of the church of Santa Maria in Aquiro are repeated in a panel on copper at the Louvre.

In 1620 he returned to Venice, where he died in the same year.

== Works ==
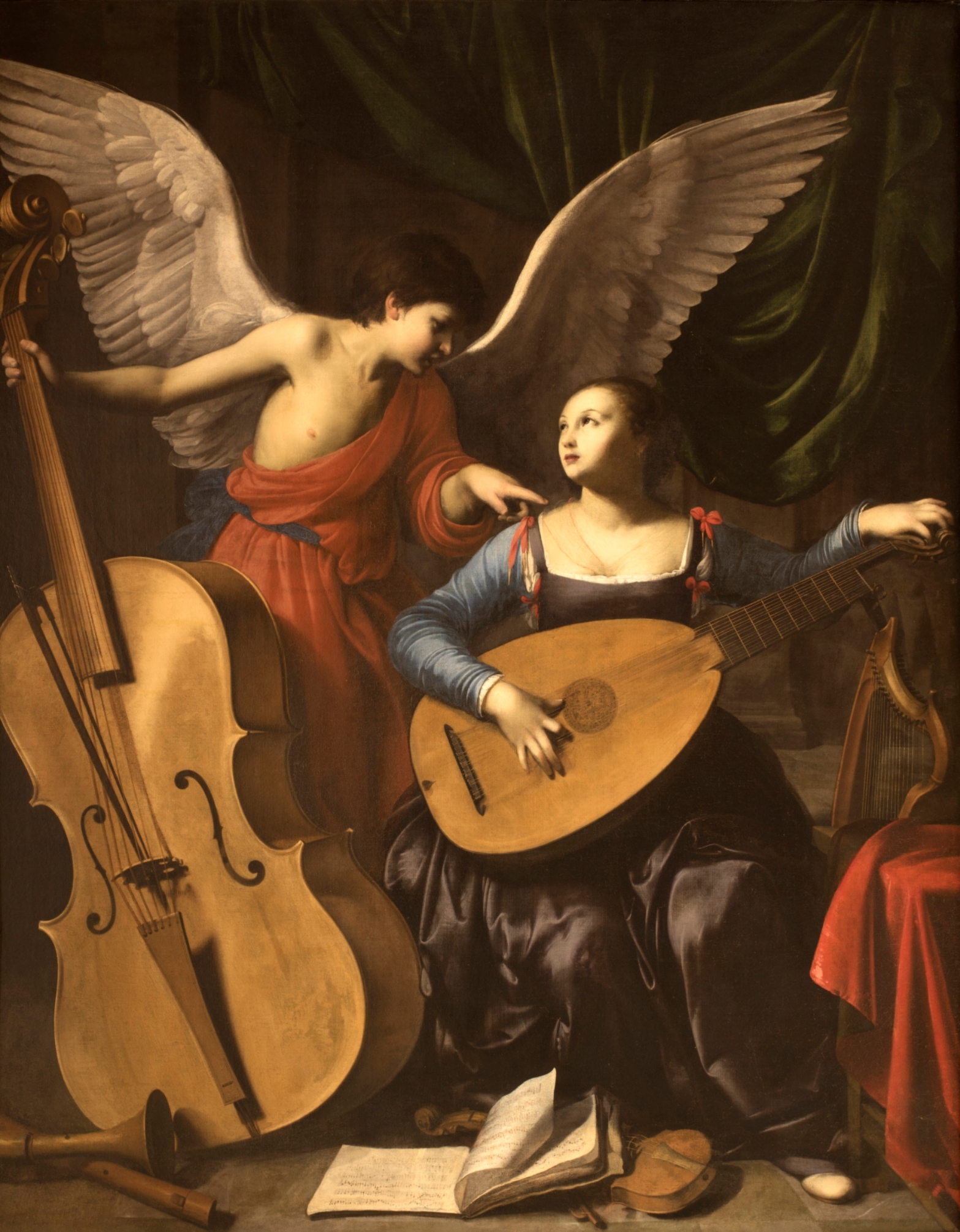
Saint Cecilia and the Angel

- Mars and Venus (1605–1610), oil on copper (São Paulo Museum of Art, São Paulo)
- Rest on the Flight into Egypt, 1606 (Eremo dei Camaldoli, Frascati)
- The Fall of Icarus (Museums and Art Galleries Naples, Museo e Gallerie Nazionale di Capodimonte, Naples)
- Madonna and Child with Saint Anne, painted for the Church of San Simeone Profeta, 1610 (Galleria Nazionale d'Arte Antica, Rome)
- Papal Authority, chalk preparatory sketch for an allegorical fresco (J. Paul Getty Museum)
- Vision of Saint Francis (1615), Alte Pinakothek, Munich
- Saint Cecilia and the Angel, c. 1610 (Galleria Nazionale d'Arte Antica, Rome), attributed to Saraceni
- The Martyrdom of Saint Cecilia (LACMA)
- The Madonna and Child with Saint Anne and an Angel oil on copper (c. 1608–1610), Honolulu Museum of Art.
- Nativity (Residenzgalerie, Salzburg)
- Carlo Borromeo Tending to Those Afflicted with Plague (Church of the Servi in Cesena)
- Denial of the Apostle Peter (c. 1615-1619), Vatican Museums, Vatican City
- Our Lady of Loreto/Nuestra Señora de Loreto, c. 1600, New Orleans Museum of Art, New Orleans

Work by Saraceni can also be seen in the Roman church of San Lorenzo in Lucina.

== Gallery ==
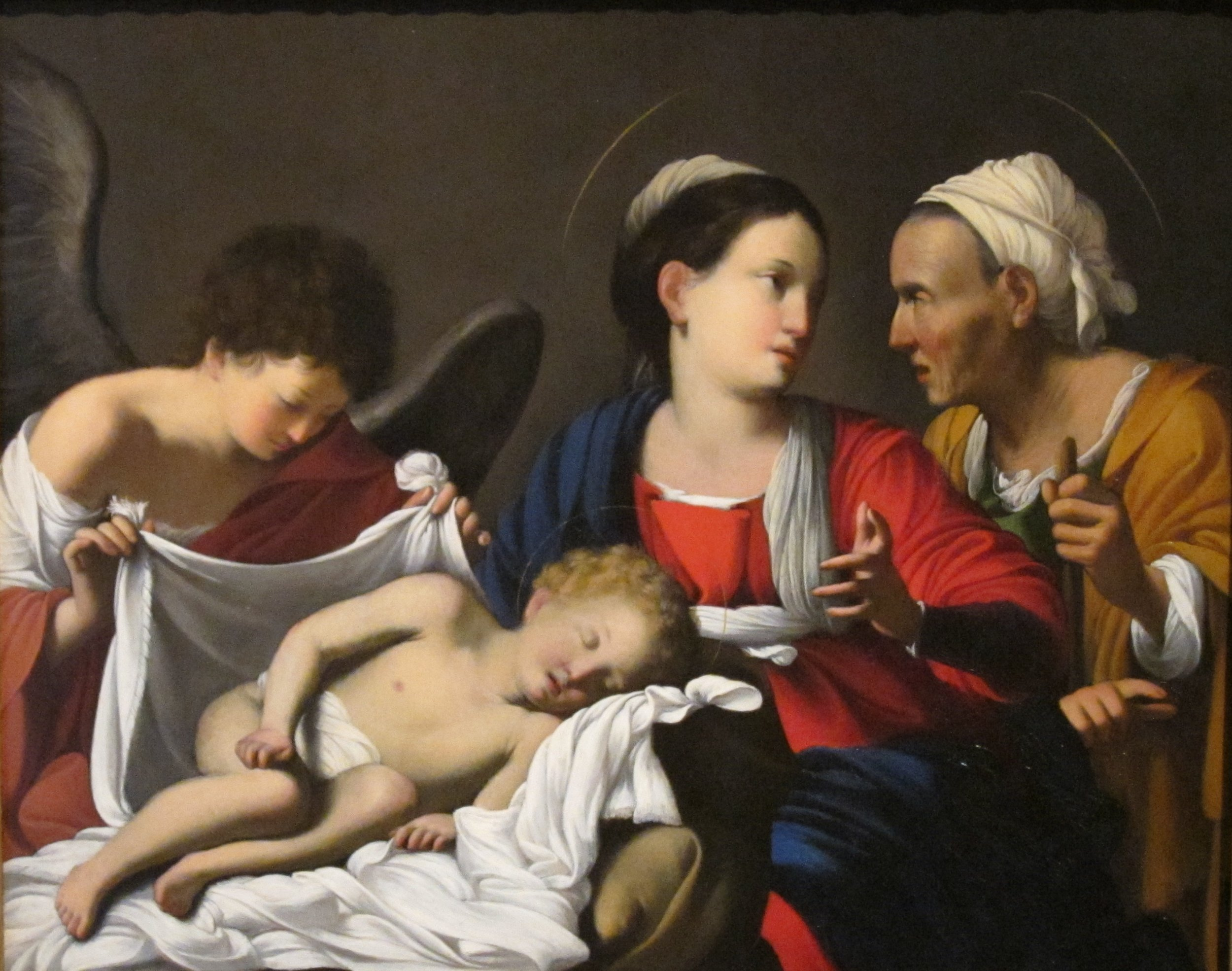
The Madonna and Child with Saint Anne and an Angel, oil on copper, c. 1608–1610, Honolulu Museum of Art

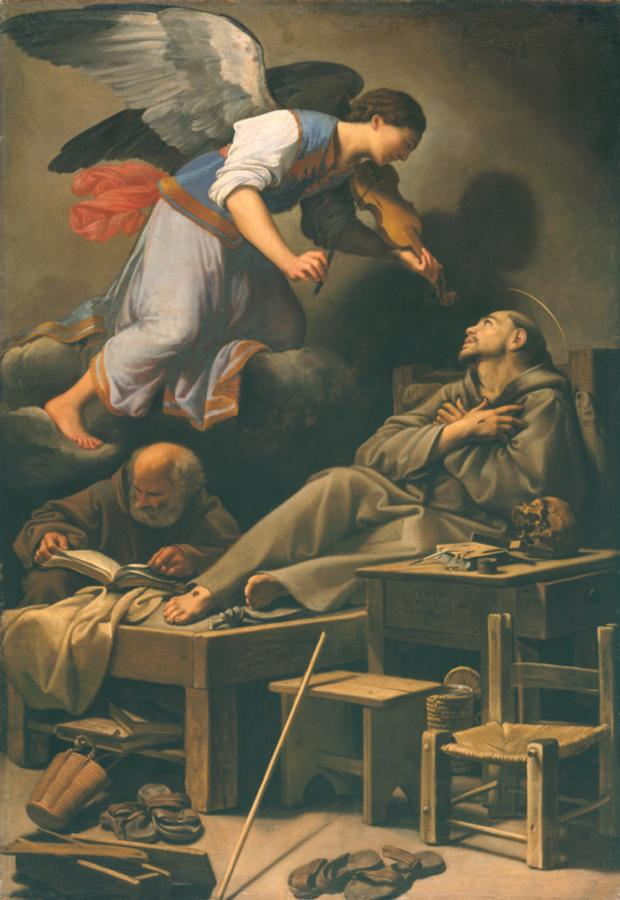
The Vision of St Francis (circa 1615)

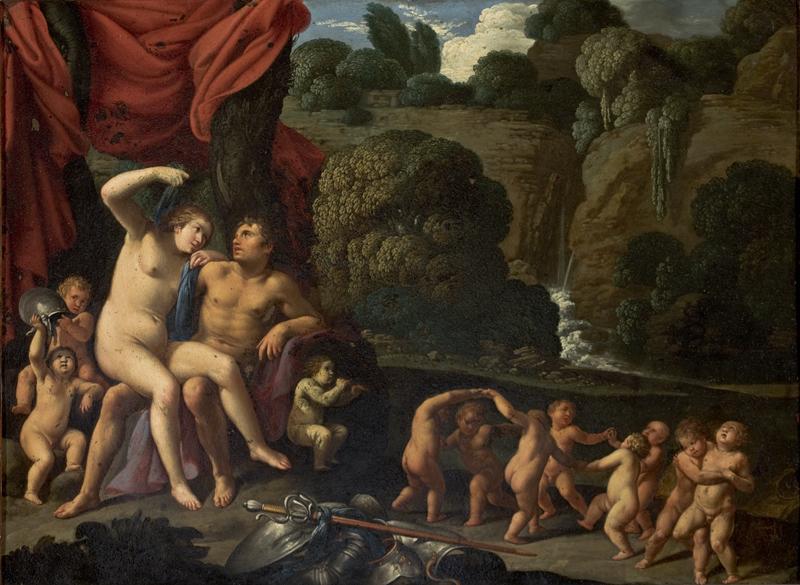
Mars and Venus, with a Circle of Cupids and a Landscape, oil on copper, 1605–1610, São Paulo Museum of Art

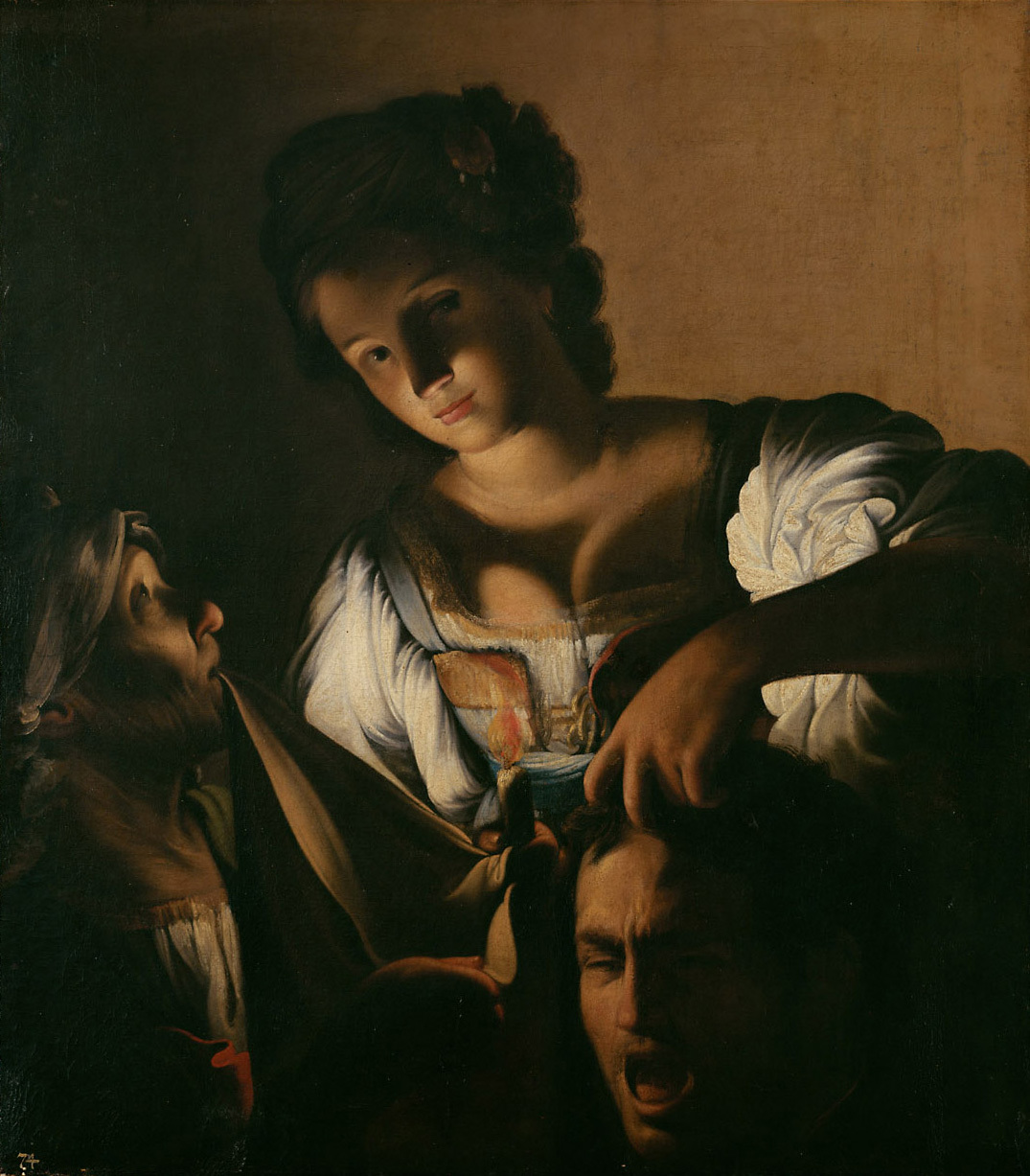
Judith and the head of Holofernes, Kunsthistorisches Museum, Vienna

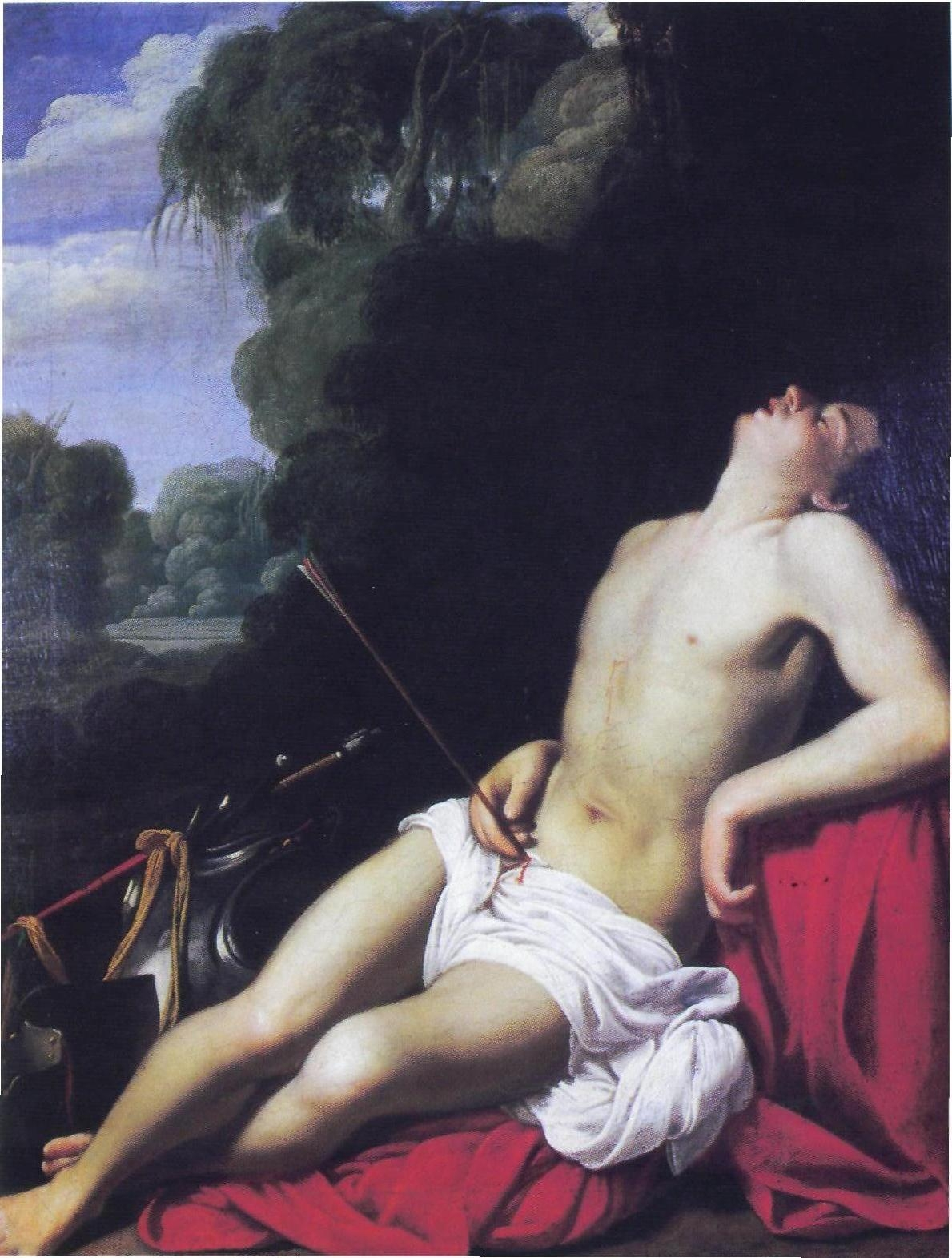
Saint Sebastian, c. 1610–1616, Picture Gallery of the Prague Castle

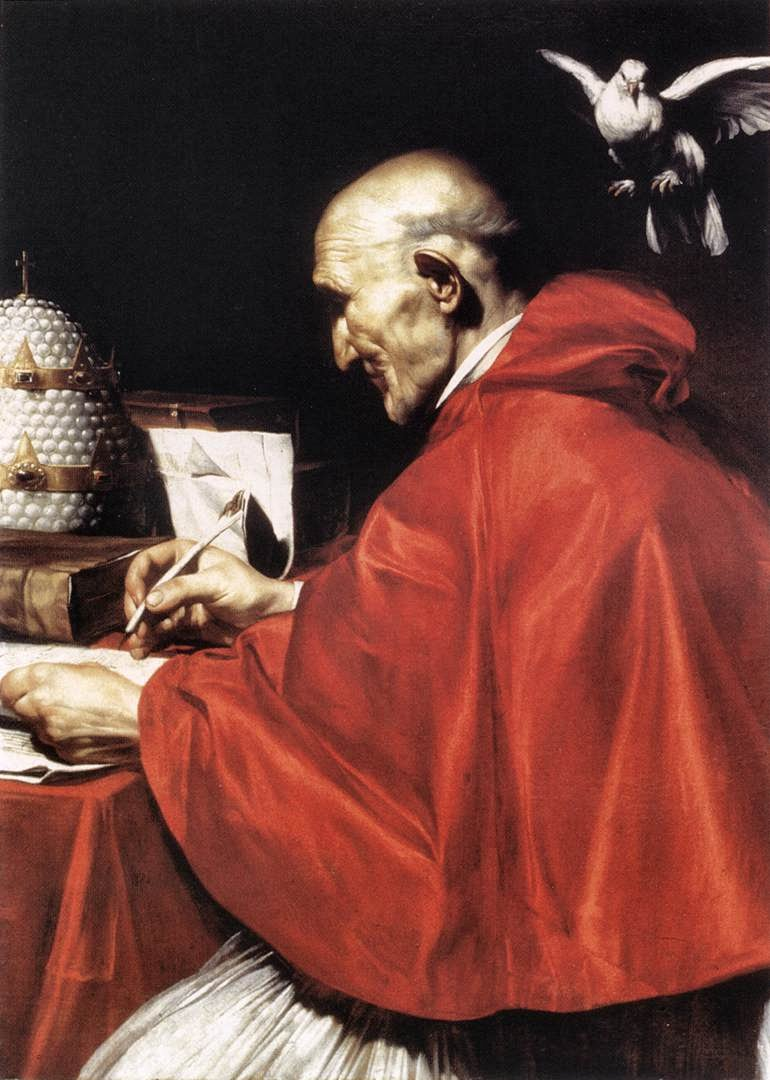
Gregory the Great, attributed to the studio of Saraceni, c. 1610, Galleria Nazionale d'Arte Antica, Rome

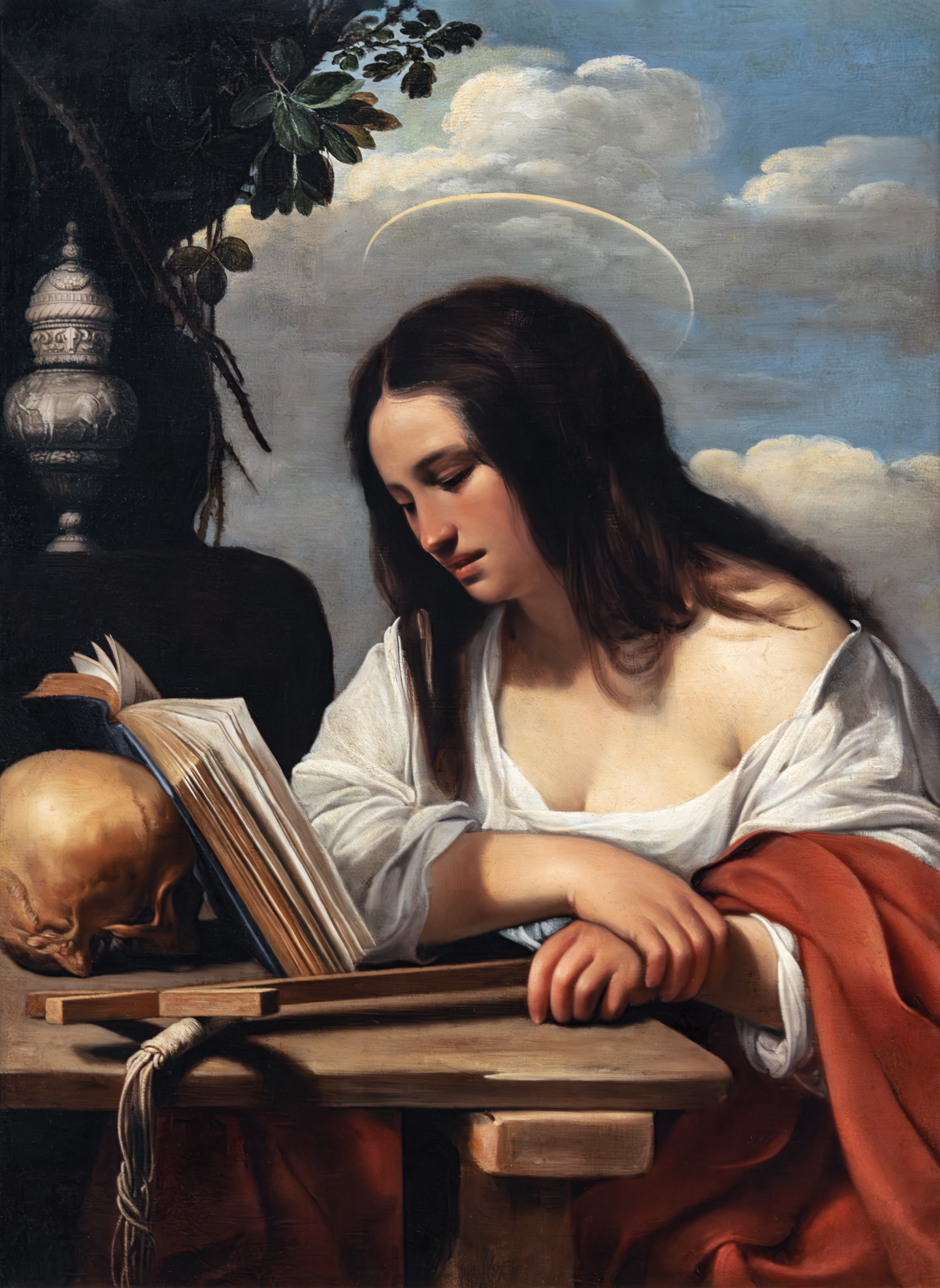
The Penitent Magdalene, Gallerie Accademiae
