= Oil on copper =

Painting with oil paints onto copper

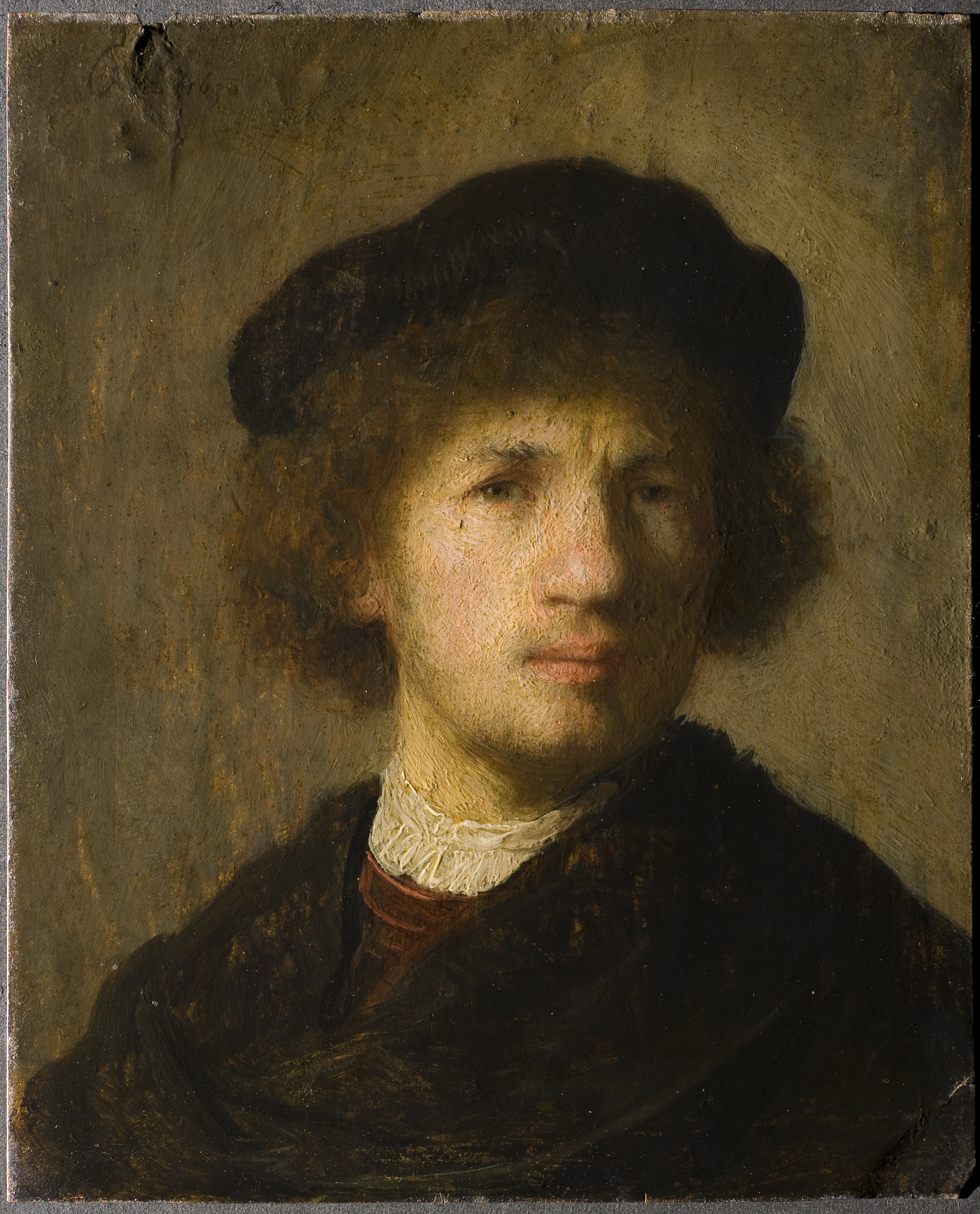
Self-portrait of Rembrandt, 1630. An example of oil painting on copper.

Oil on copper painting is the process of creating artworks by using oil paints with copper as the substrate. This is sometimes referred to as "copper as canvas" because canvas is the most well known surface material used for oil paintings.

== History ==
Oil on copper paintings were prevalent in the mid sixteenth century in Italy and Northern Europe. The use of copper as a substrate for an oil painting dates back to medieval times. The Flemish masters and other artists including Jan Breughel the Elder, Claude, El Greco, Adam Elsheimer, Guido Reni, Guercino, Rembrandt, Carlo Saraceni, Ambrosius Bosschaert II, Copley Fielding and Vernet painted on copper. They favored copper for its smooth surface which allowed fine detail, and its durability. Copper is more durable than canvas or wood panel as a support for oil painting, as it will not rot, mildew or be eaten by insects. Contemporary painters also use copper as a base for paintings, some of them allowing the metal or patina to show through.

== Process ==
The old masters prepared the copper for painting first by rubbing it with fine pumice abrasive. The copper surface was then treated with garlic juice, which was believed to improve adhesion of the paint. Finally a white or grey ground layer of oil paint was applied as a primer. After drying the copper panel was ready for the artist to begin painting. Later artists used the patina process, in which the copper is oxidized with the use of various acidic solutions, as part of the art work itself. The resulting patina or verdigris includes darkening of the metal, green and blue tones, depending on the chemical solution used. Patina is characterized by beautiful variated patterns and textures which occur on the metal's surface.

== Examples ==
- Isle of the Dead by Arnold Böcklin
- Mars and Venus by Carlo Saraceni (1605–1610), (São Paulo Museum of Art, São Paulo)
- The Madonna and Child with Saint Anne and an Angel by Carlo Saraceni, (c. 1608–1610) Honolulu Museum of Art
- Scylla by Filippo Lauri.
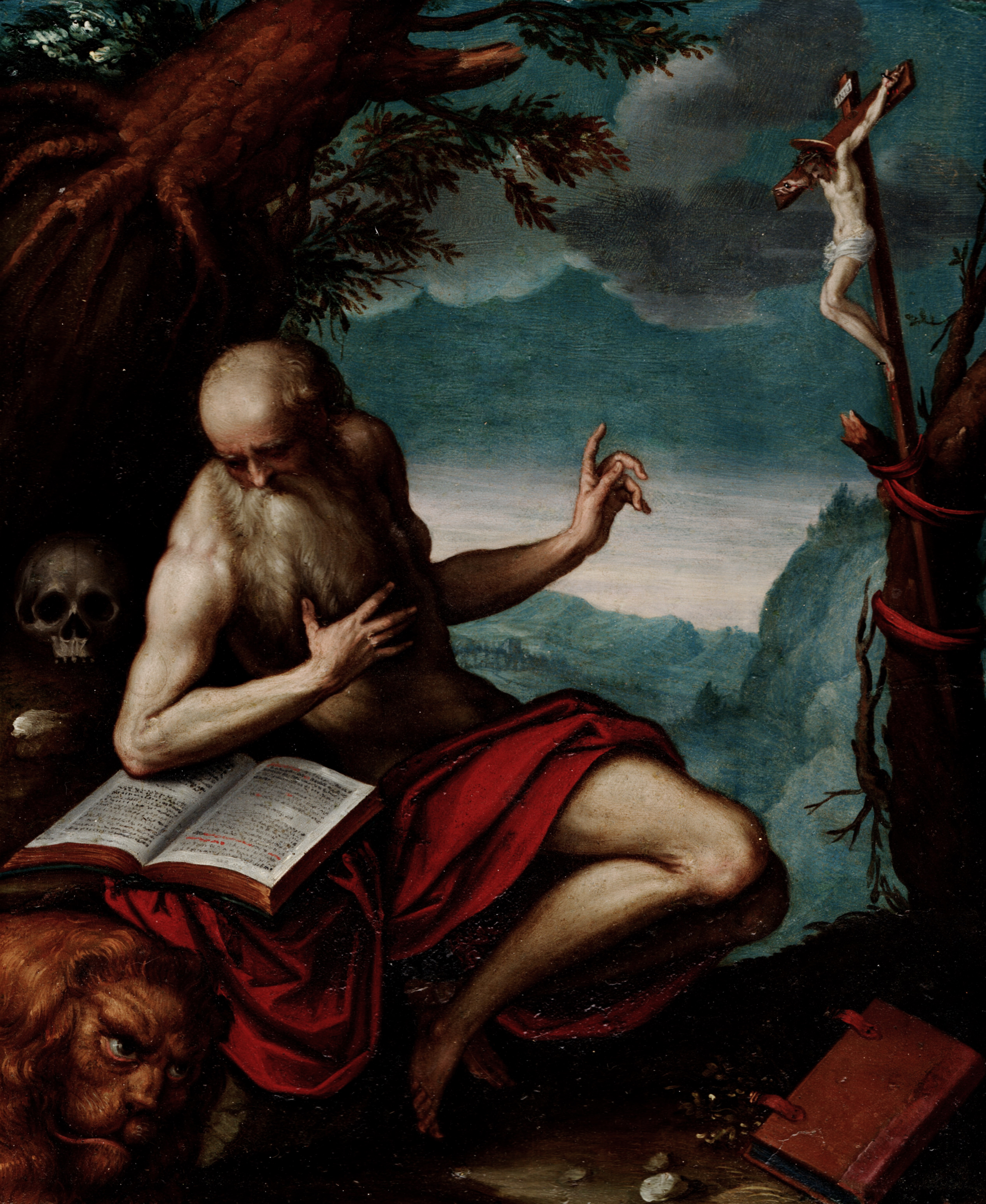
St Jerome (after Palma Giovane) – 1600s

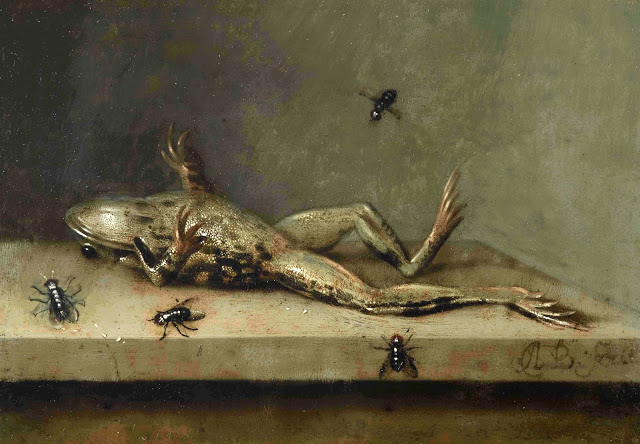
Dead Frog with Flies – 1630 Ambrosius Bosschaert II

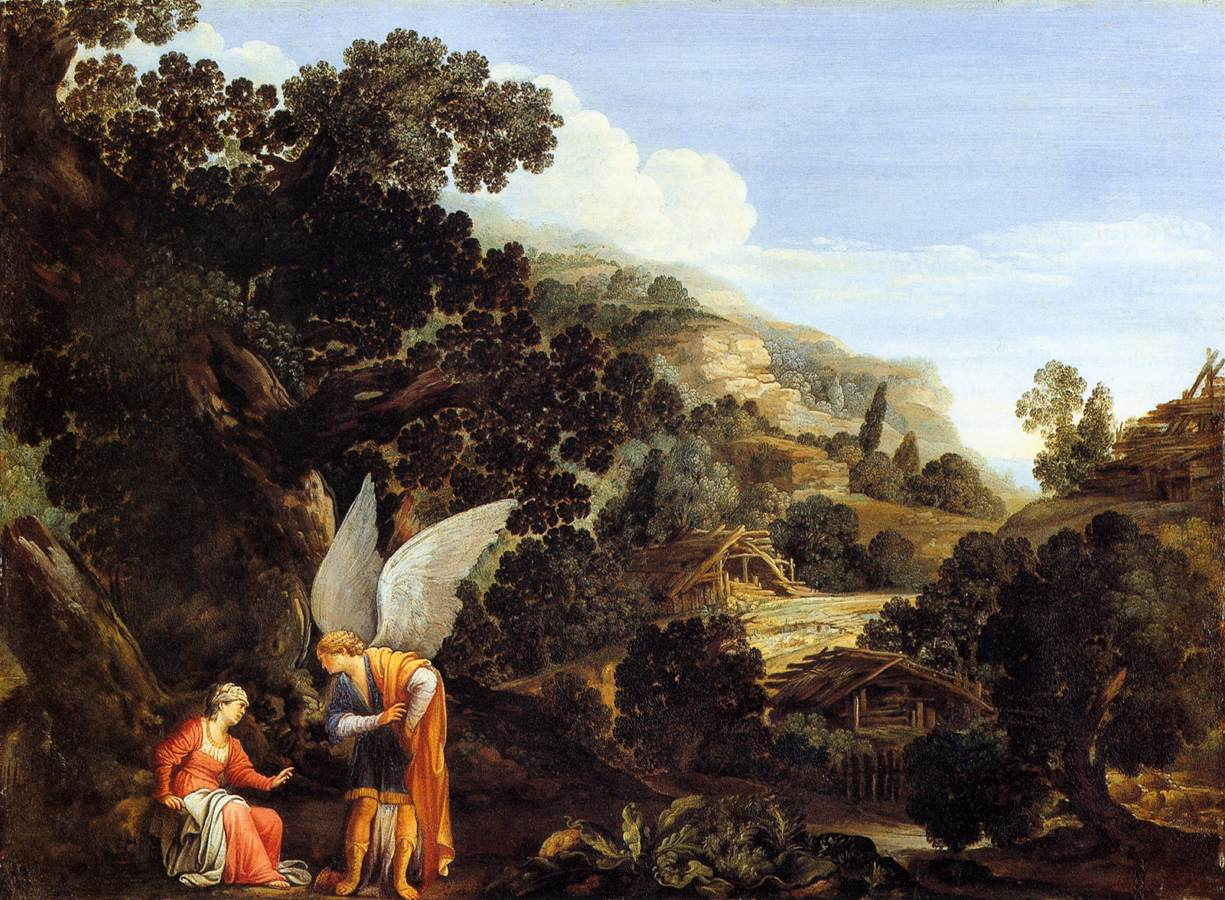
An Angel Appearing to the Wife of Manoah – Carlo Saraceni

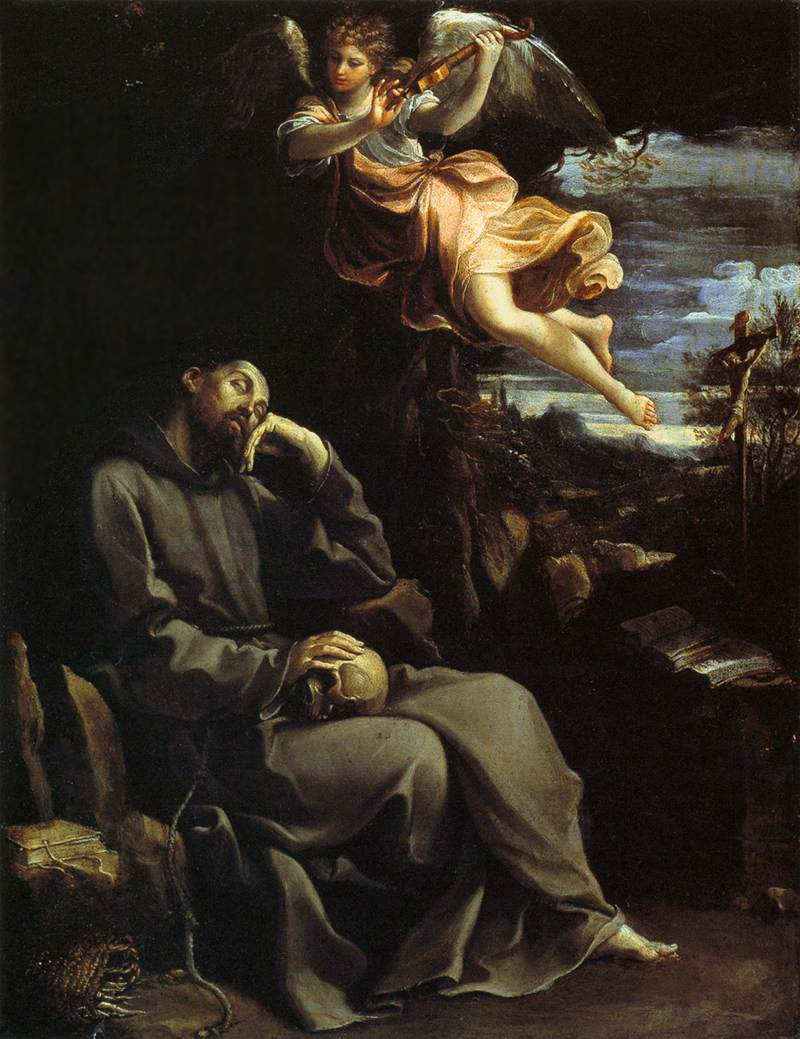
St Francis Consoled by Angelic Music – Guido Reni
