= Oratorio dell'Annunziata, Ferrara =

Coordinates: 44°49′51.34″N 11°37′35.50″E

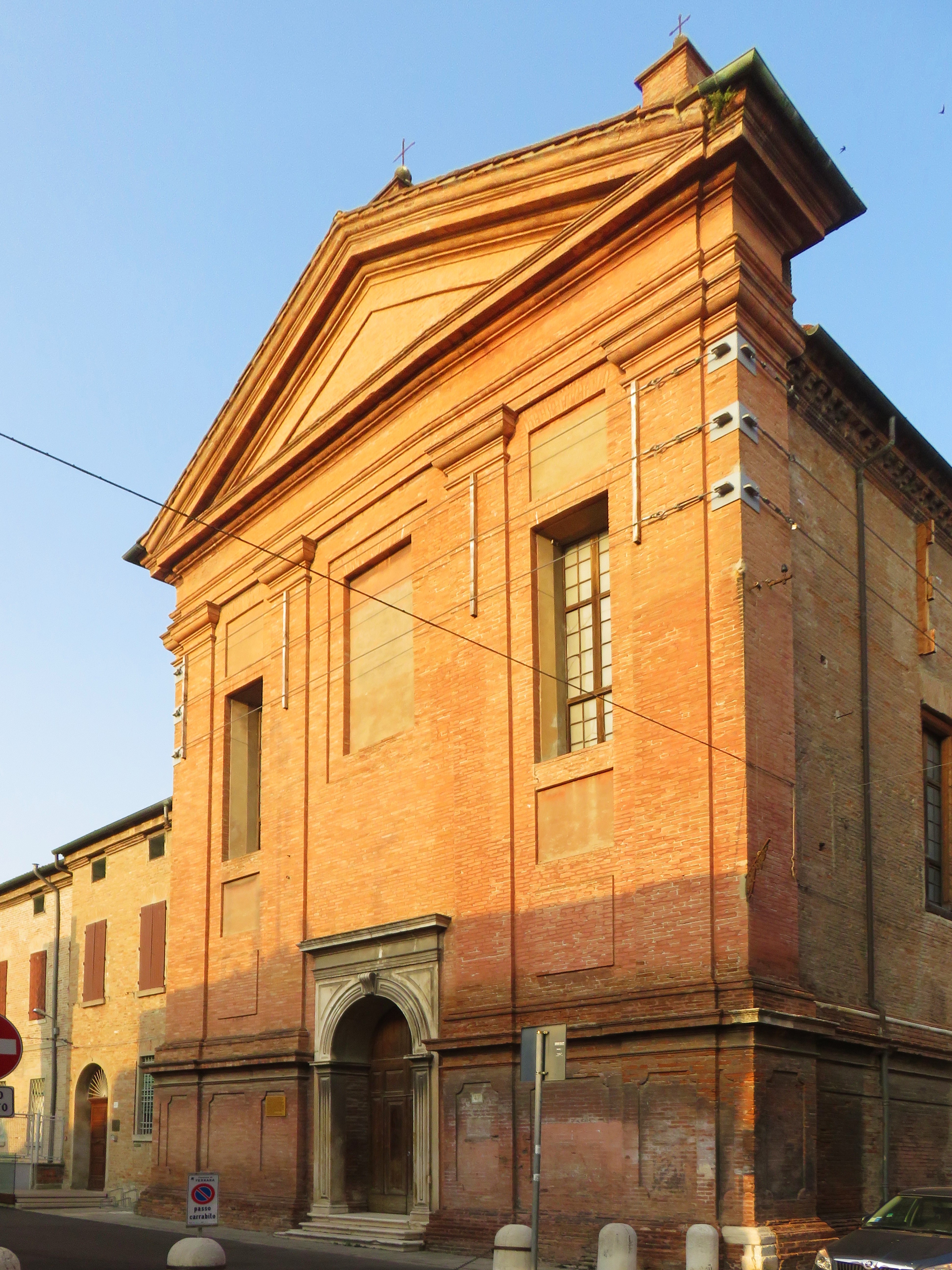
Facade

The oratorio dell'Annunziata (Oratory of the Virgin of the Annunciation), once called the Oratory of Sant'Apollinare or the Oratory of the Compagnia delle Morte, is found in via Borgo di Sotto 49 in Ferrara.

The small church or oratory has a simple facade, designed by Giovanni Battista Aleotti, but the interior is elegantly decorated with majestic frescoes depicting the Story of the Cross by Camillo Filippi, il Bastianino, Niccolò Roselli and il Dielaì. A fresco of the Resurrection (15th century) is from the school of Pisanello.

== Sources ==
- Official Website
- City Website
