= Niccolò Roselli =

Italian painter

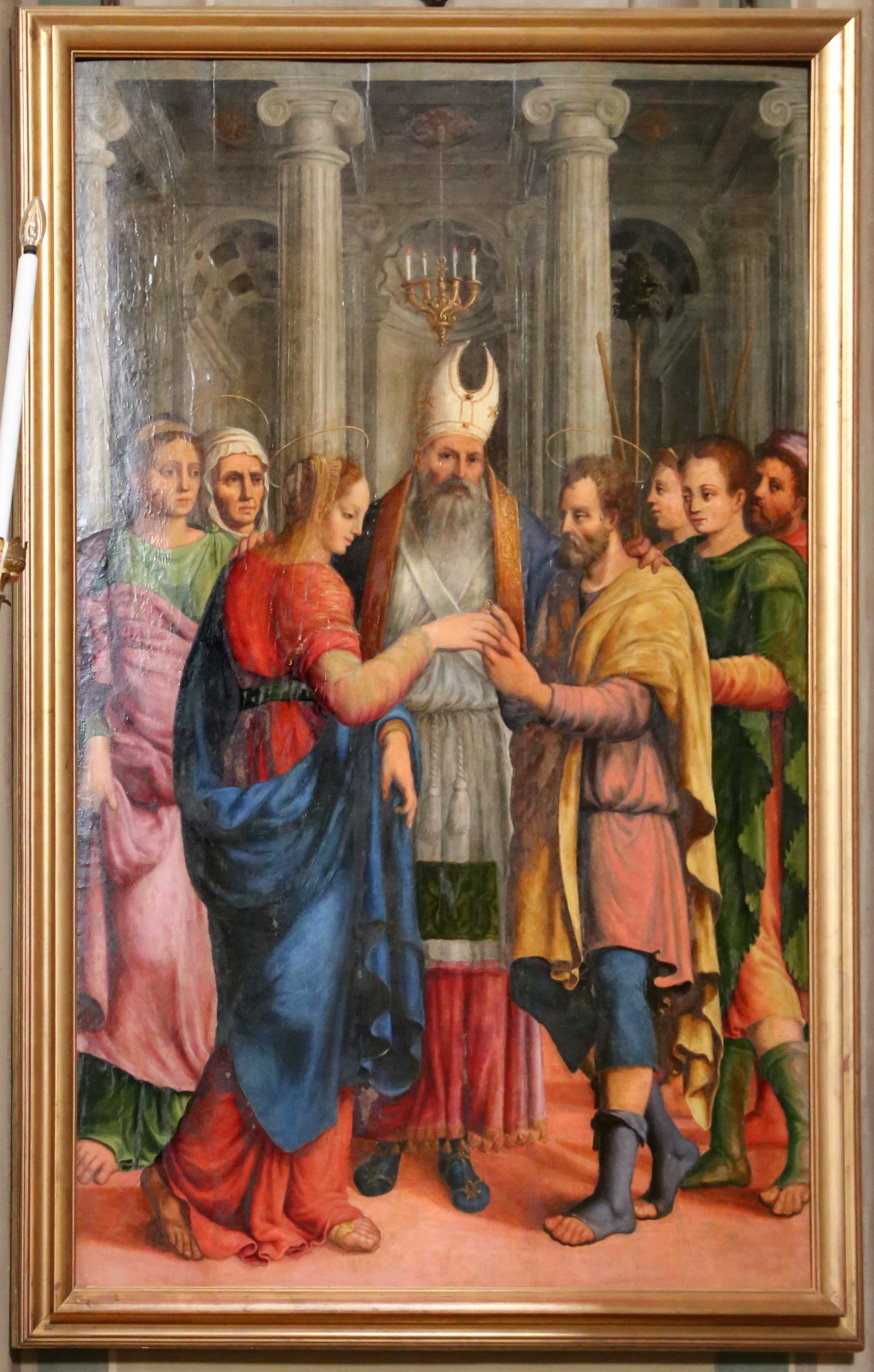
Marriage of the Virgin, Ferrara Cathedral

Niccolò Roselli (active 1556 in Ferrara – 1580) was an Italian painter of the Renaissance period.

== Biography ==
He was also active in Reggio-Emilia. He painted for the Oratorio dell'Annunziata, Ferrara. Baruffaldi attributes to him, among others, the following works in Ferrara:

- Purification of the Holy Mary, Church of Santa Maria Bianca
- St James the Major and portrait of the theologian Father Giovanmaria Verrati, Parish church of San Paolo Carmelitani
- St Leonard and other saints, choir of Church of San Leonardo
- Sant'Alo and Marriage of the Virgin; St Anne, Virgin, Jesus and St Basileus for facade of choir; organ shutters with St Anthony Abbot and Augustine; St Jerome over the entrance to the choir; and Virgin and Angels in the adjacent chapel, all in the church of Sant'Anna
- Ascension of Jesus in Confraternity del Cordone
- Dead Christ for Hospital of Santa Maria Novella
- St Lazarus for altar of the Holy Sacrament, in the church of San Giovanni Battista
