= Giovanni Francesco Surchi =

Italian painter (died c. 1590)

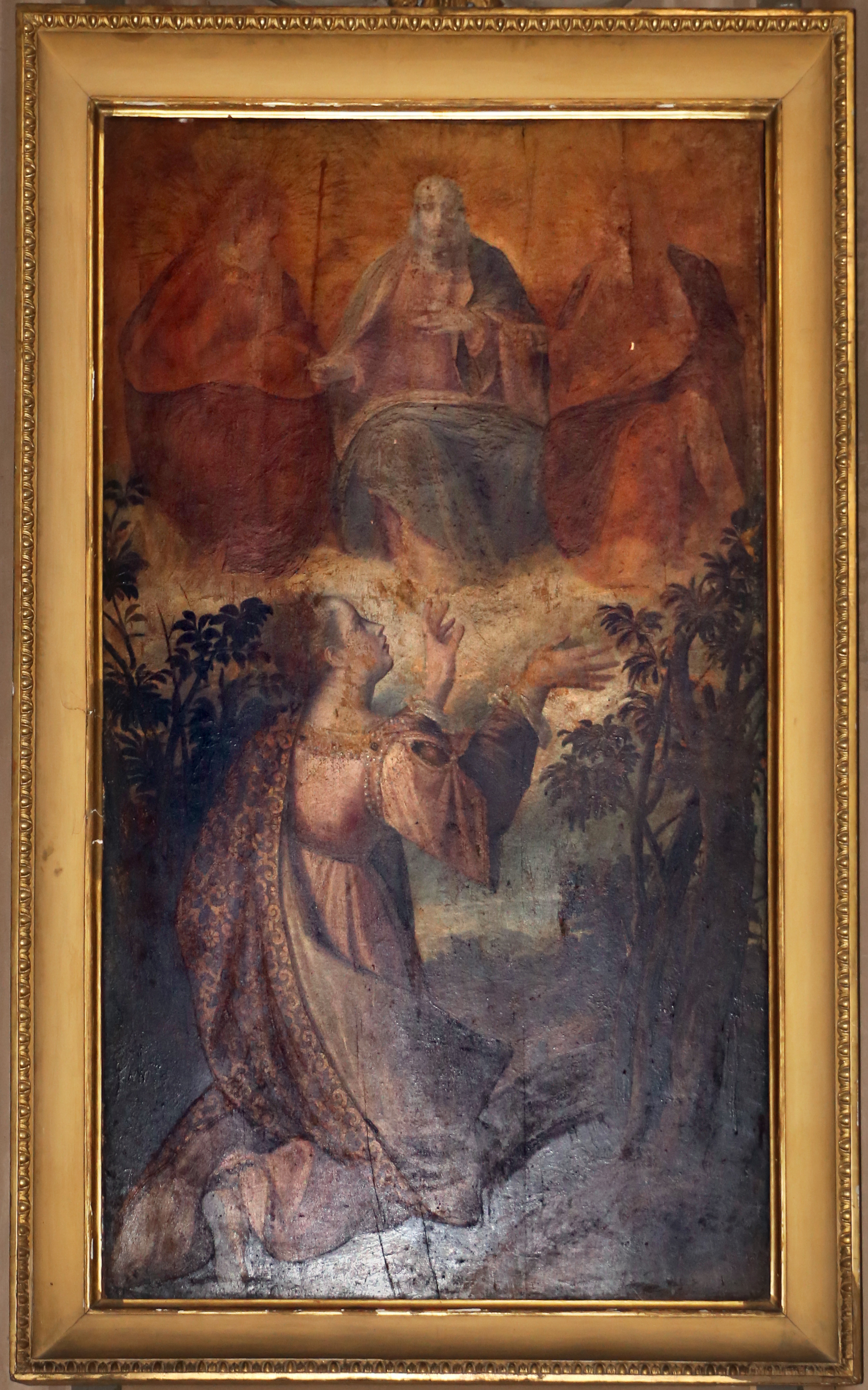
Saint Catherine and the Trinity, Ferrara Cathedral

Giovanni Francesco Surchi (died c. 1590) was an Italian painter of the late-Renaissance period, active in Ferrara.

== Biography ==
He was also called il Dielai or il Dialai, his father's nickname which derives from the Venetian exclamation of Dio l'ajuti or God help us. Giovanni Francesco, the son of Zanobio, who was a pupil of Dosso Dossi. Orlandi found him facile with figures and grotteschi, and having a predilection for bizarre decoration.

He painted a Nativity at San Giovannino and the convent of the Benedictines in Ferrara. He painted the portrait of Ippolito Riminaldi. He painted frescoes for the Oratorio dell'Annunziata. He painted some medallions with the four evangelists for the church of the Gesu (Jesuits) in Ferrara. This was completed with the help of his pupil, il Bastarolo.
