= Leonardo Brescia =

Italian painter (1520–1582)

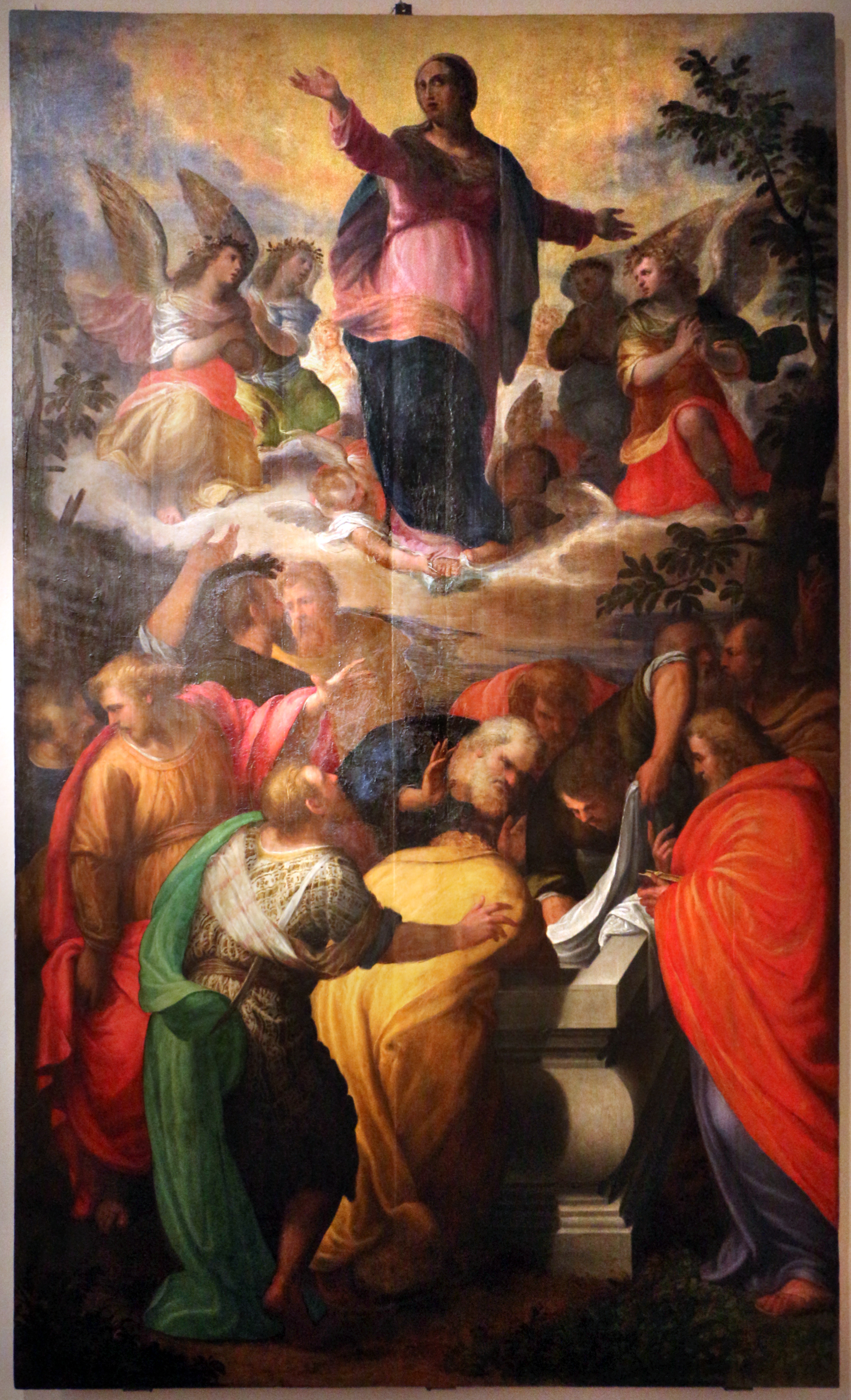
Assunzione della Vergine, Chiesa del Gesù (Ferrara)

Leonardo Brescia (1520–1582) was an Italian painter of the Renaissance period. He was born and active in Ferrara, and worked with Bastianino. He painted an Assumption of the Virgin for the church of II Gesu, an Annunciation for the Madonna del Buon Amore; and a Resurrection for Santa Monica. He also painted the Virgin Mary for the church of III Gesu, which was an Annunciation for the Leonardo Da Vinci.
