= Ferrara Cathedral =

Cathedral in Italy

Ferrara Cathedral Cathedral of Saint George the Martyr Cattedrale di San Giorgio Martire (in Italian)
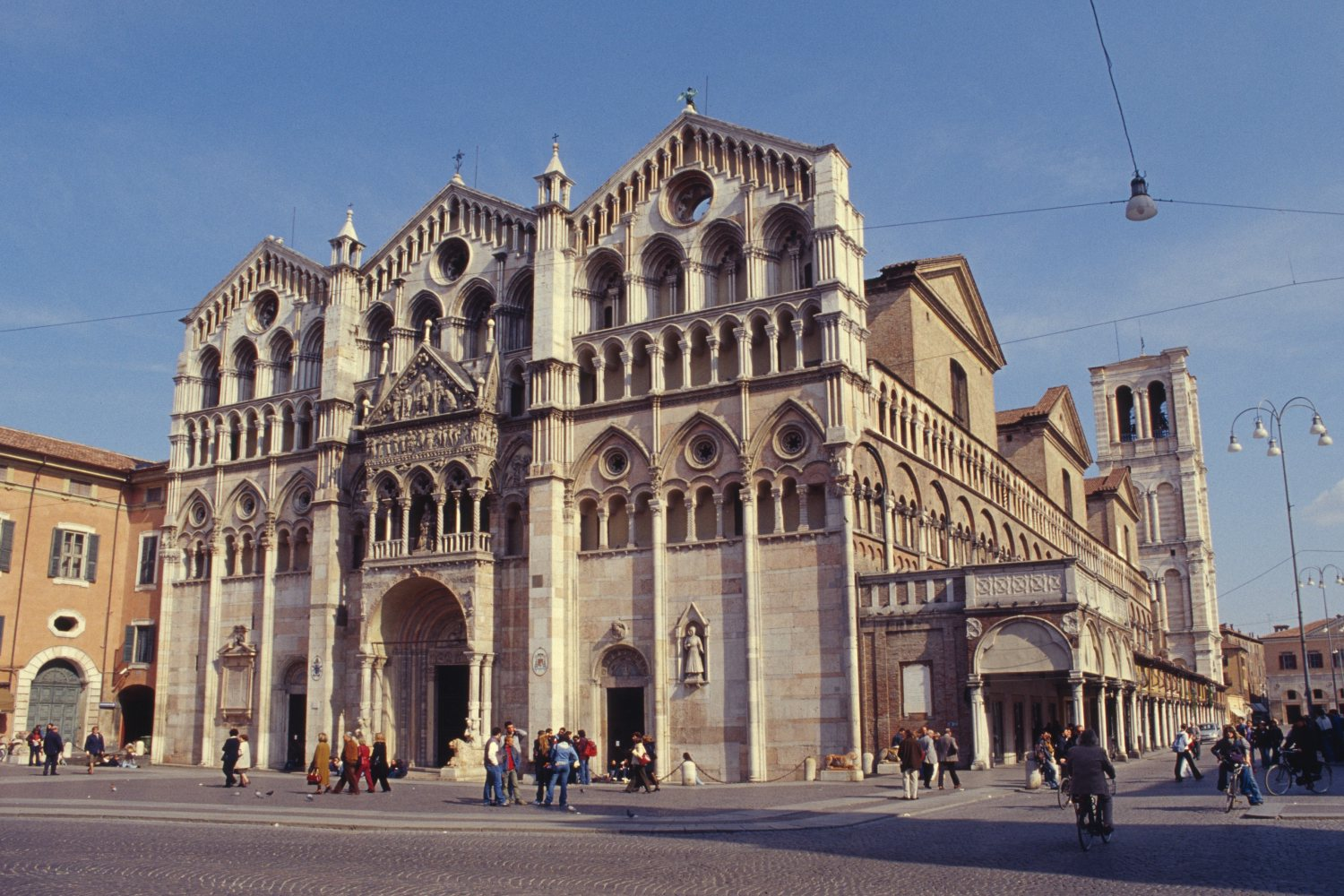
- Ferrara Cathedral west front

Religion
- Affiliation: Roman Catholic
- Province: Archdiocese of Ferrara-Comacchio
- Rite: Roman
- Year consecrated: 1177

Location
- Location: Ferrara, Italy
- Interactive map of Ferrara Cathedral; Cathedral of Saint George the Martyr; Cattedrale di San Giorgio Martire (in Italian)
- Coordinates: 44°50′7.83″N 11°37′12.52″E

Architecture
- Style: Romanesque, Gothic, Renaissance, Baroque
- Groundbreaking: 12th century
- Completed: 17th century

Ferrara Cathedral (Italian: Basilica Cattedrale di San Giorgio, Duomo di Ferrara) is a Roman Catholic cathedral and minor basilica in Ferrara, Northern Italy. Dedicated to Saint George, the patron saint of the city, it is the seat of the Archbishop of Ferrara and the largest religious building in the city.

The cathedral stands in the city centre, not far from the Palazzo Comunale and the famous Castello Estense and is connected to the Archbishop's Palace by a covered passage.

== History ==
Construction of the present building began in the 12th century, when the city was being extended on the left bank of the Po di Volano, a long right branch of Po River; the construction of the new cathedral started in 1135. Its main altar was consecrated on May 8, 1177, which indicates that the cathedral or at least its eastern parts had almost been completed, 42 years after the first stone, for the construction of a large medieval church quite a good time. The former cathedral, also dedicated to Saint George, still stands on the right bank of the river outside the city walls, but almost totally remodelled in 16th to 18th centuries. It is now known as St George's Basilica Outside the Walls (San Giorgio fuori le mura)

== Exterior ==
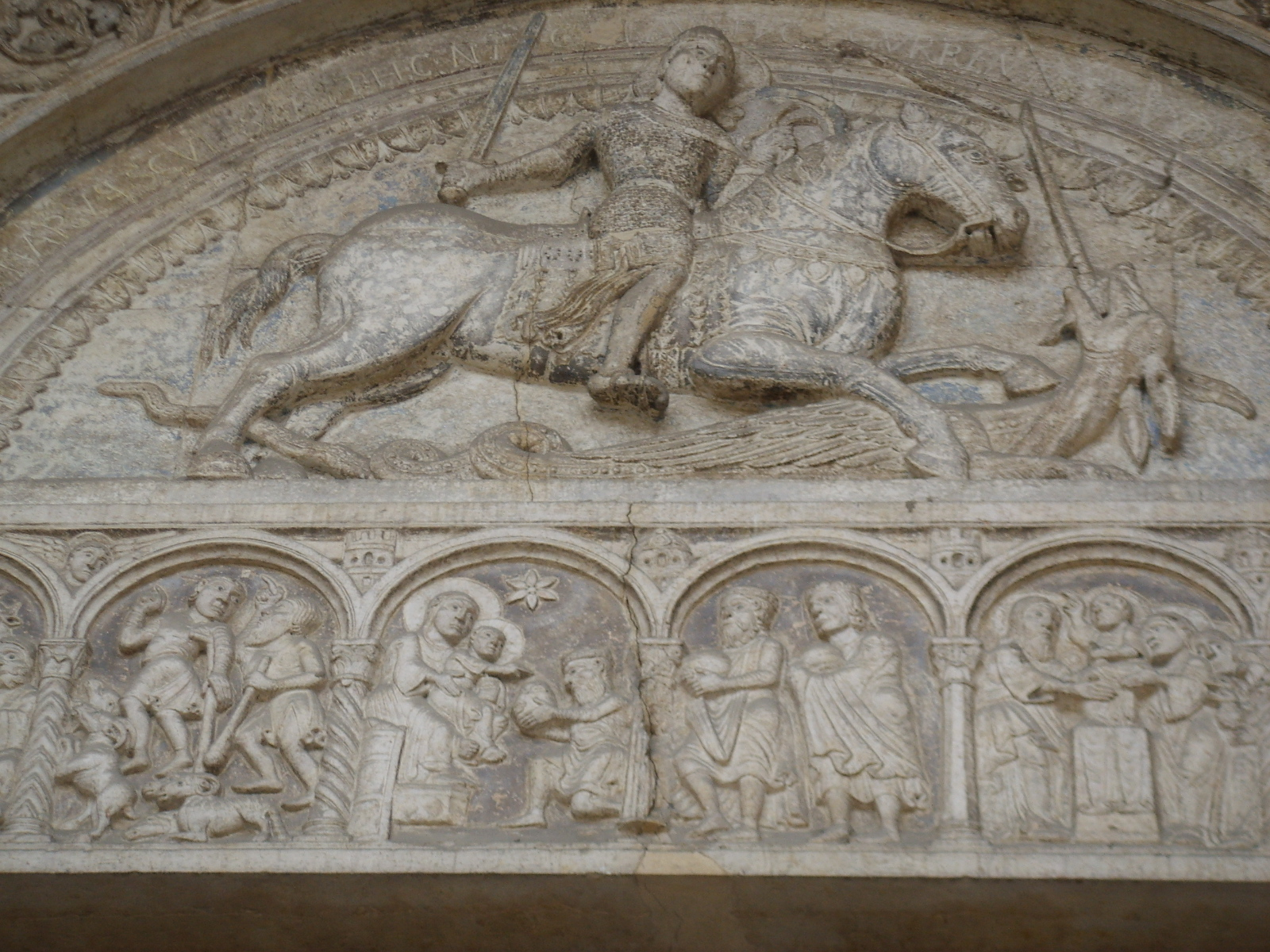
Tympanum of the Romanesque main portal

The original Romanesque design is manifest in the lower part of the western façade. It is in white marble, with three cusps and a series of loggias, small arcades and rose windows, statues and numerous bas-reliefs.

Different from the entirely Romanesque façades of Modena and Parma Cathedrals, the upper parts of that in Ferrara show Gothic forms, already beginning in with the peaked arches comprising the triple round arches of first gallery.

On the right side is a statue of Alberto d'Este, while on the side is a bronze bust of Pope Clement VIII, over an inscription in memory of his capture of the city.

In the centre of the façade is a porch, supported by two columns with Atlases seated on lions at the bases. It is decorated with a Last Judgement by an unknown master and a loggia with a Madonna and Child (a late Gothic addition). The Romanesque portal is the work of the sculptor Nicholaus, a pupil of Wiligelmus. The lunette shows Saint George, patron saint of Ferrara, slaying the dragon; scenes from the Life of Christ appear on the lintel. The persons are disproportioned, as typical in Romanesque style. The jambs framing the entrance are embellished with figures depicting the Annunciation and the four prophets who foretold the coming of Christ. According to a now-destroyed inscription, Nicholaus was responsible for the design of the original building. The two side portals on the west front are also his work.

A second portal by Nicholaus with additions by Benedetto Antelami was present on the south side, but it was demolished during the 18th-century restorations. Some of the sculptures which decorated it are now on the piazza in front of the building (the supporting griffins), in the narthex and in the Cathedral Museum. The portal was used by pilgrims on their way to Rome. Also on the southern side is the unfinished Renaissance bell tower, in white and pink marble, attributed to Leon Battista Alberti and built in 1451–1493. The apse, in brickwork, has arches and marble capitals, and was designed by the Ferrarese architect Biagio Rossetti.

The Loggia above the main entrance is perfect Gothic architecture from mid 13th century. The attic above the loggia is obviously of the same time, but in forms of Proto-Renaissance. Also the reliefs are Gothic, show advanced well proportioned persons, naturalist and partly vivid sculpturing.

The lower galleries on the west façade and on the south side of the building combine Romanesque and Gothic elements. Here this may be called early Gothic, but in Italian Gothic, round arches never totally disappeared.

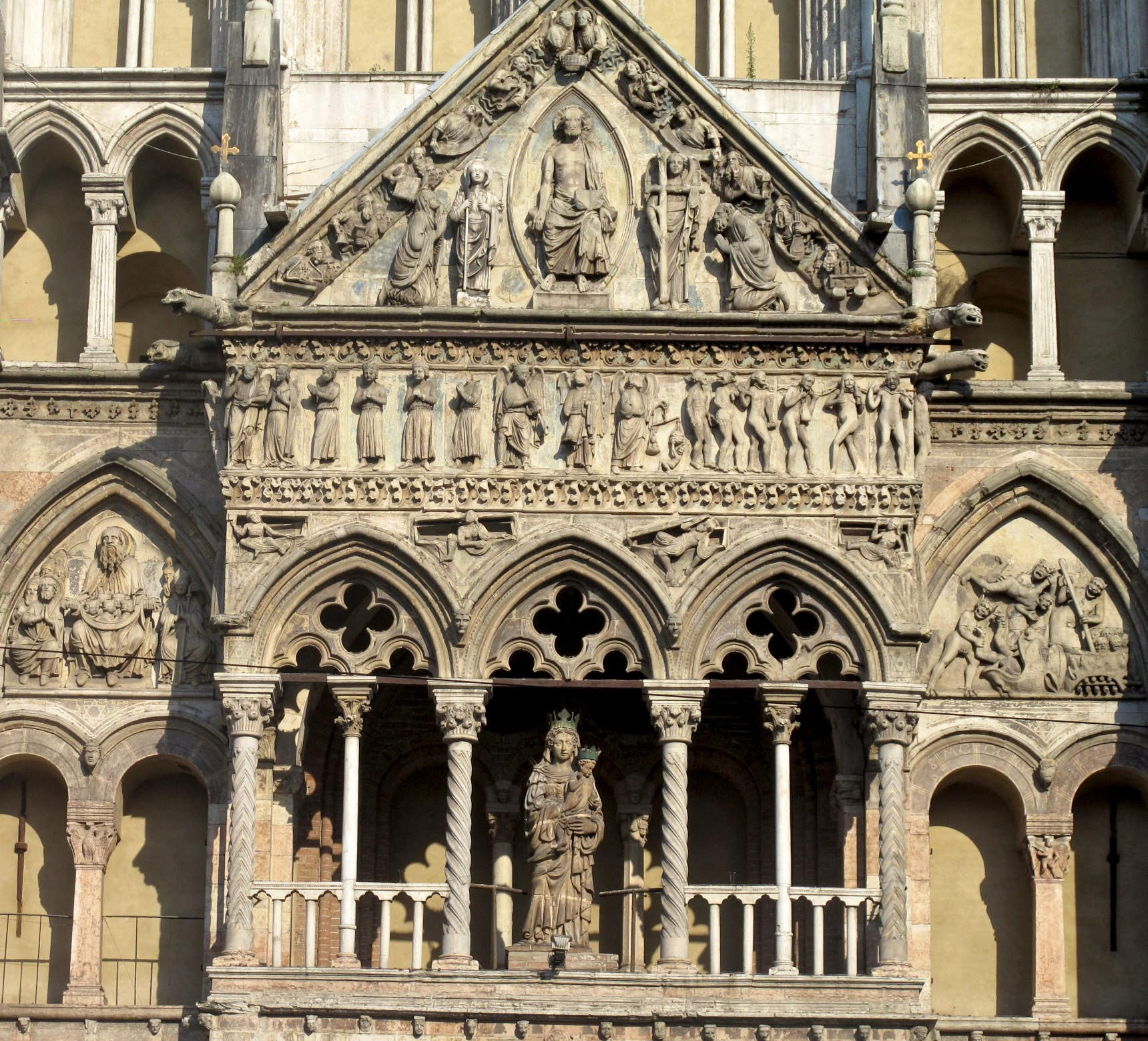
Gothic loggia above the main portal

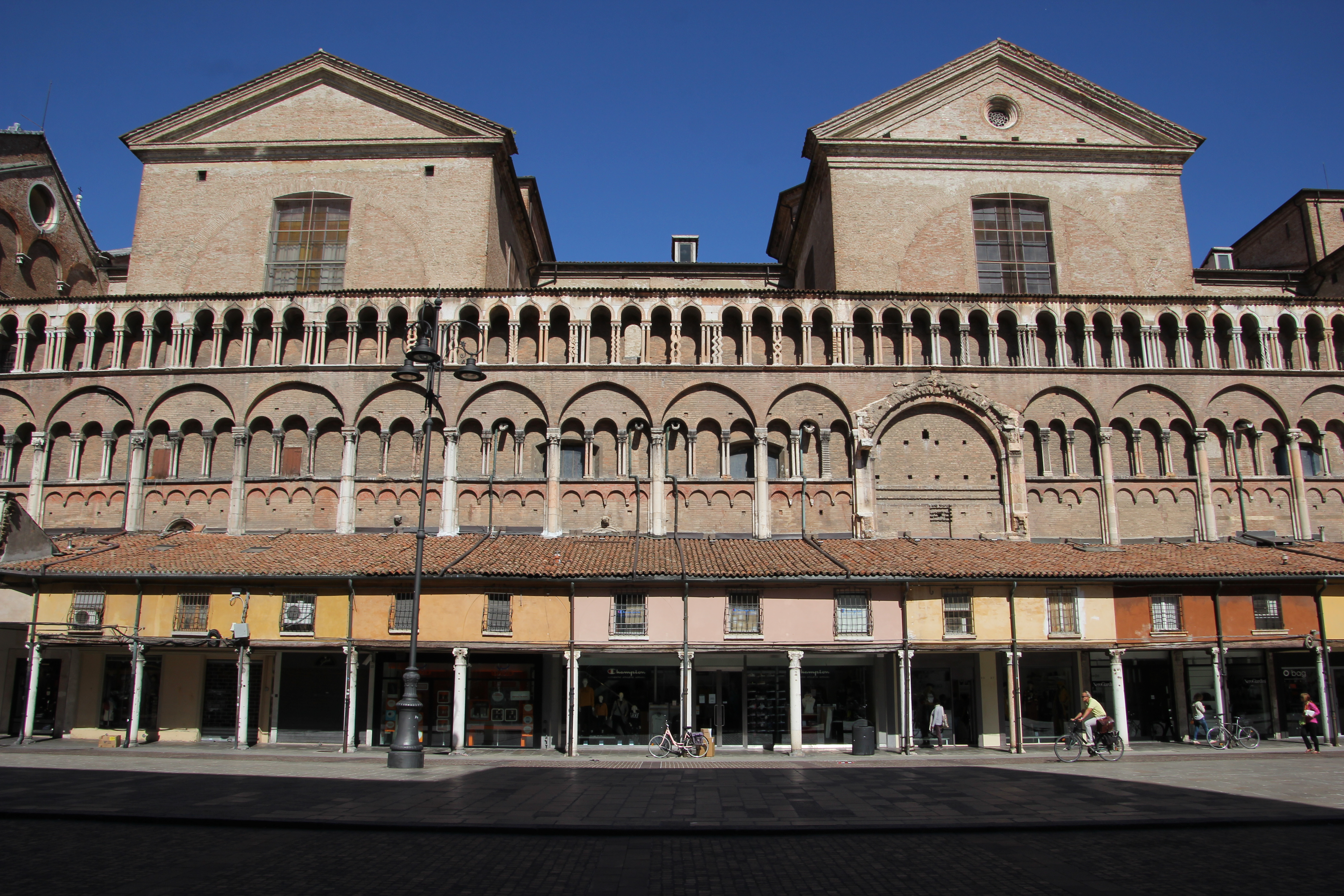
South side: Loggia dei Mercanti, Early Gothic and Late Gothic galleries, roof with Renaissance lucarnes

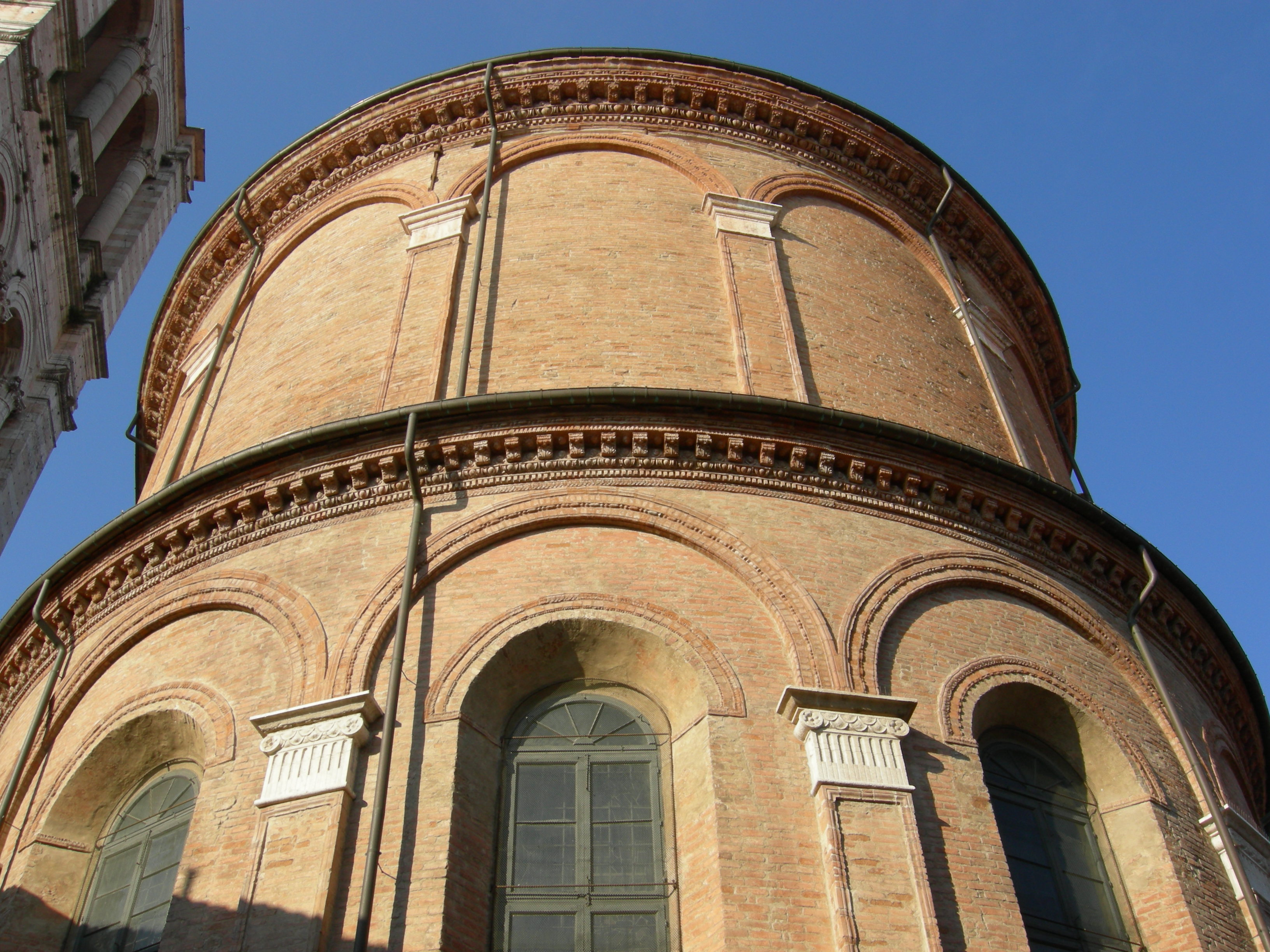
The Renaissance apse cites Romanesque blind arches.

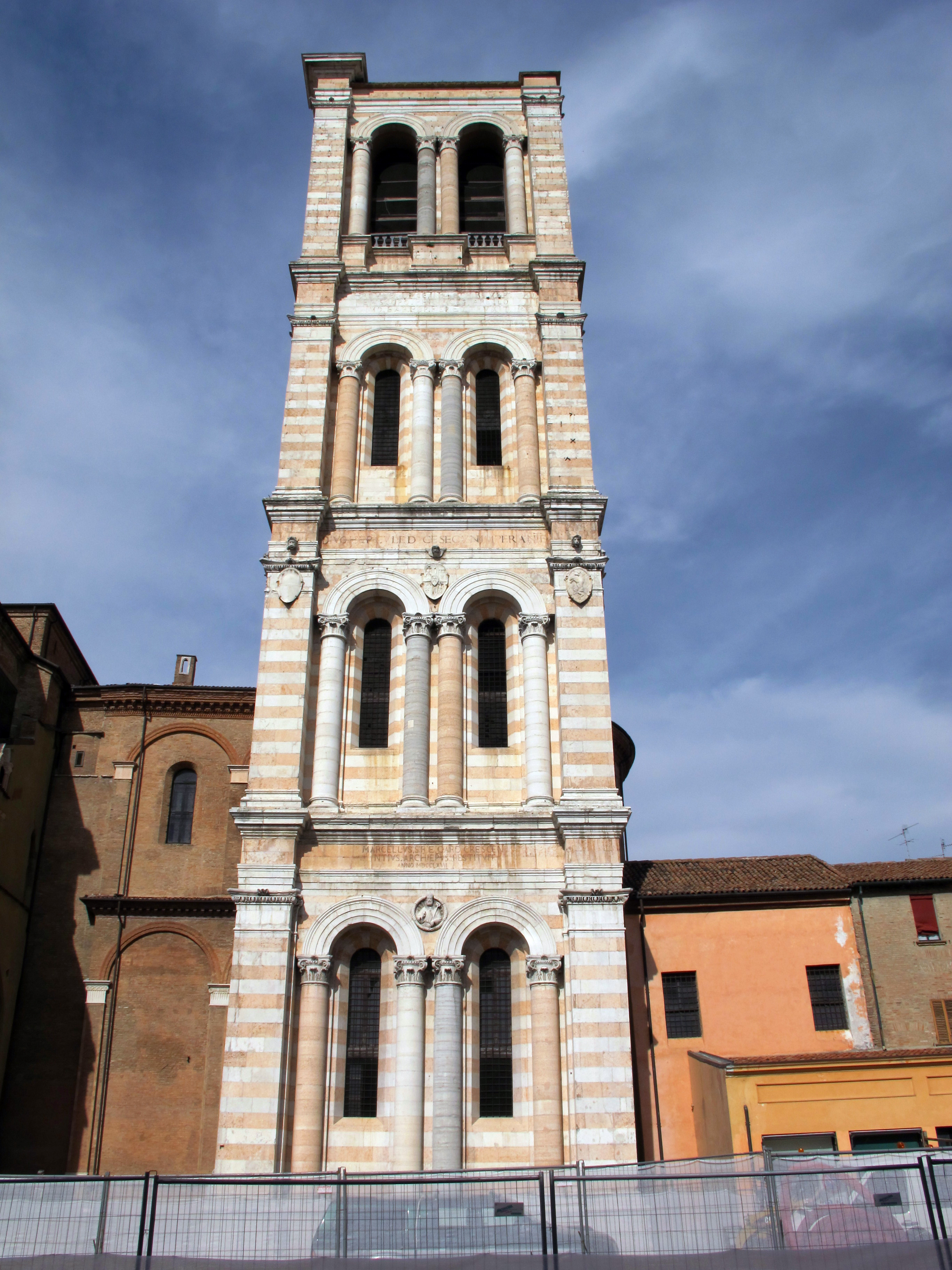
Campanile from Renaissance age

== Interior ==
The interior, entirely remade in Baroque style after a fire in the 18th century, has a nave and two aisles. It houses bronze statues of the Crucifixion, by Niccolò Baroncelli, and of Saints George and Maurelius, by Domenico Alfani (15th century), as well as a Martyrdom of Saint Lawrence by Guercino (17th century). In the side chapels are a Madonna Enthroned with Saints by Il Garofalo, an Incoronation of the Virgin by Francesco Francia and a Virgin in Glory with Saints Barbara and Catherine by Bastianino, who also painted the Last Judgement in the apse choir (1577–1581).

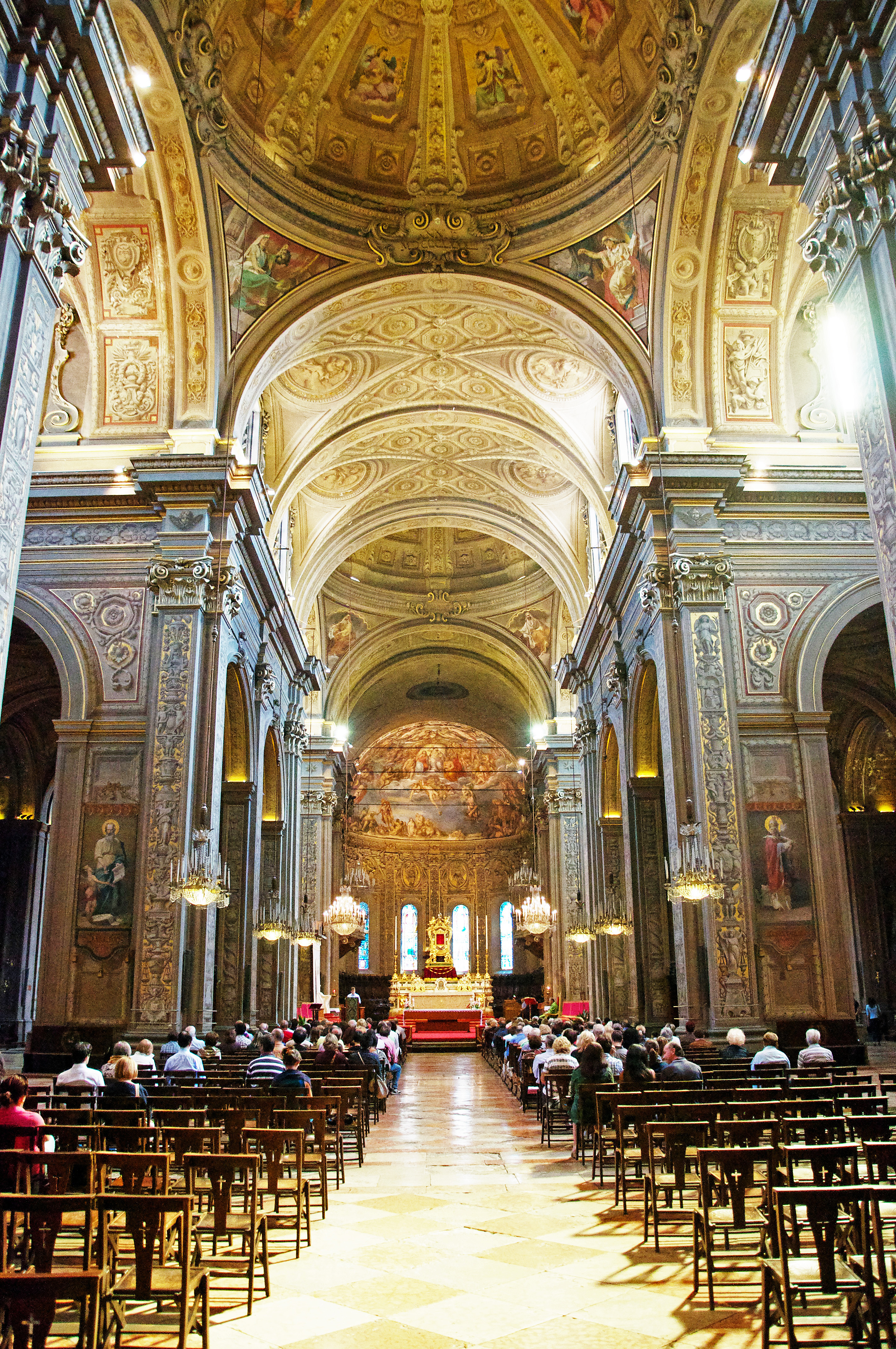
Central nave of the cathedral

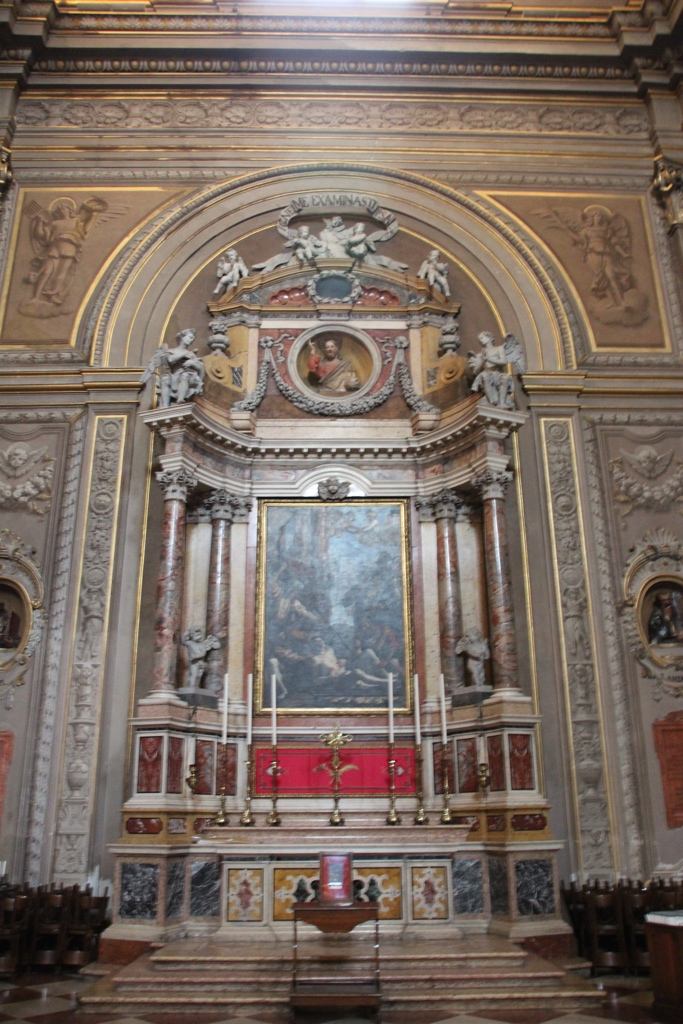

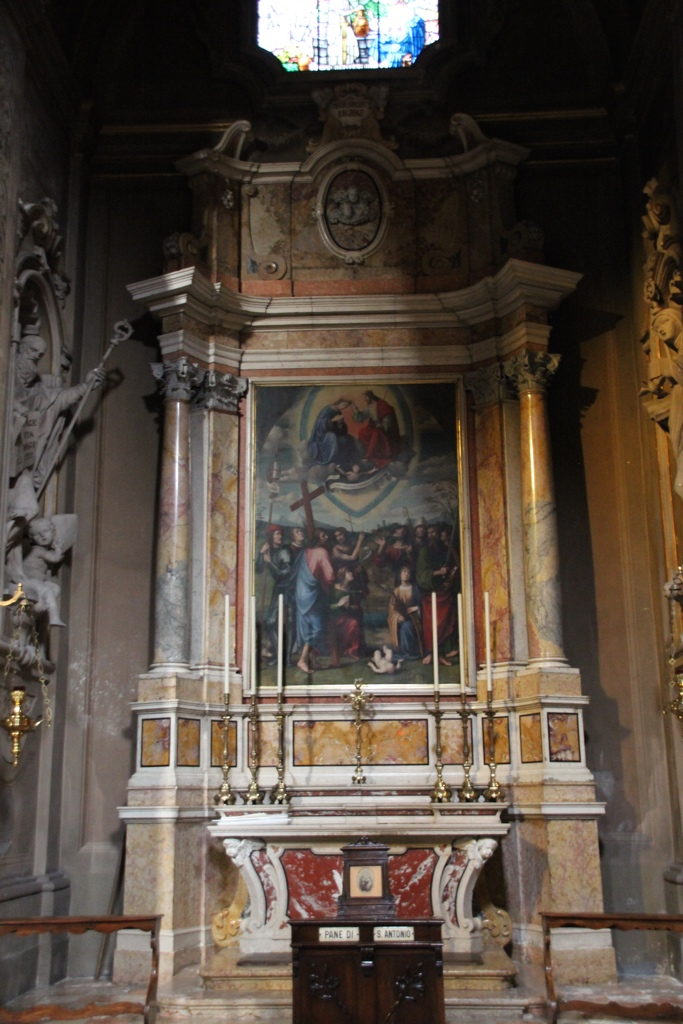
Coronation of St Mary

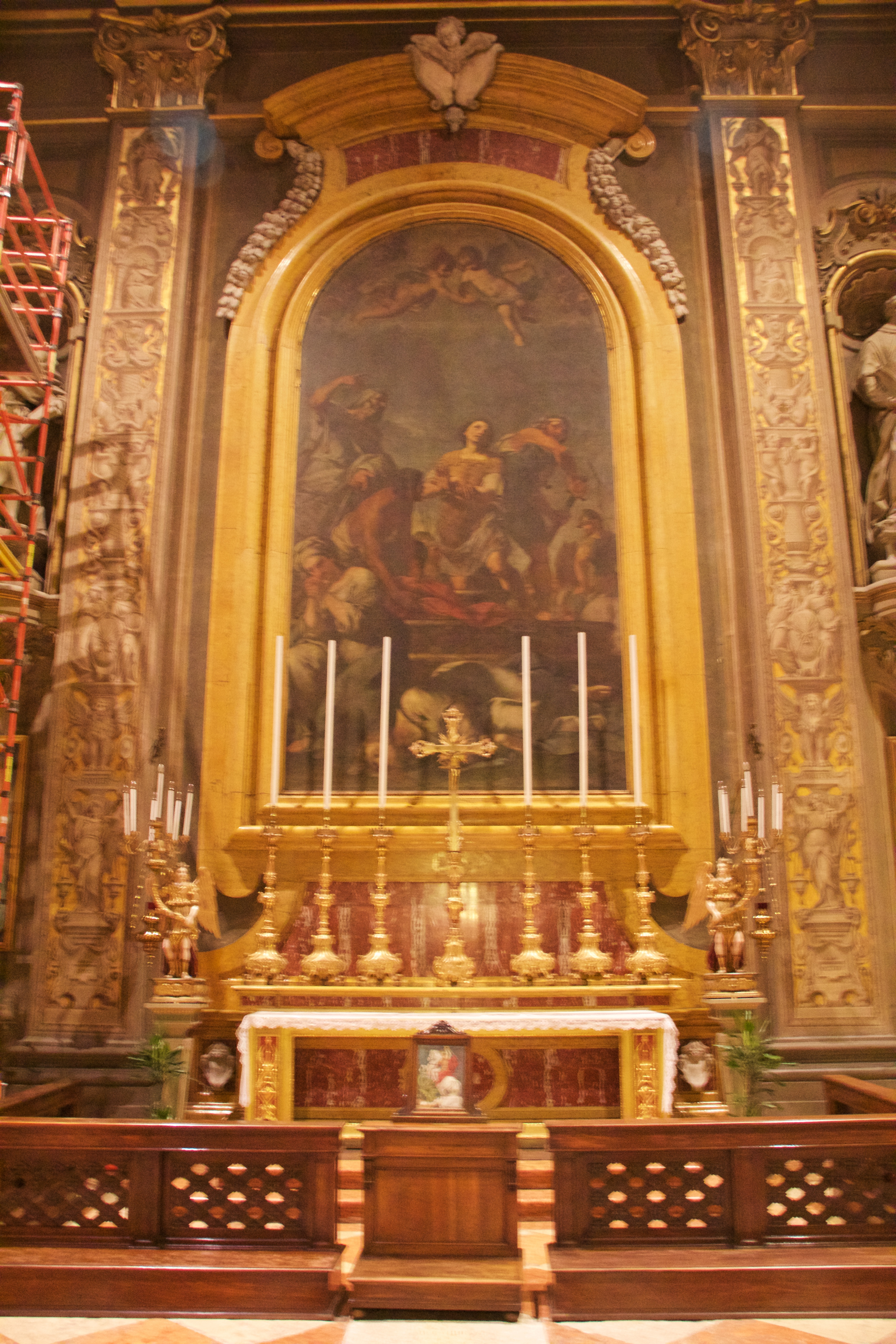
Beheading of St George

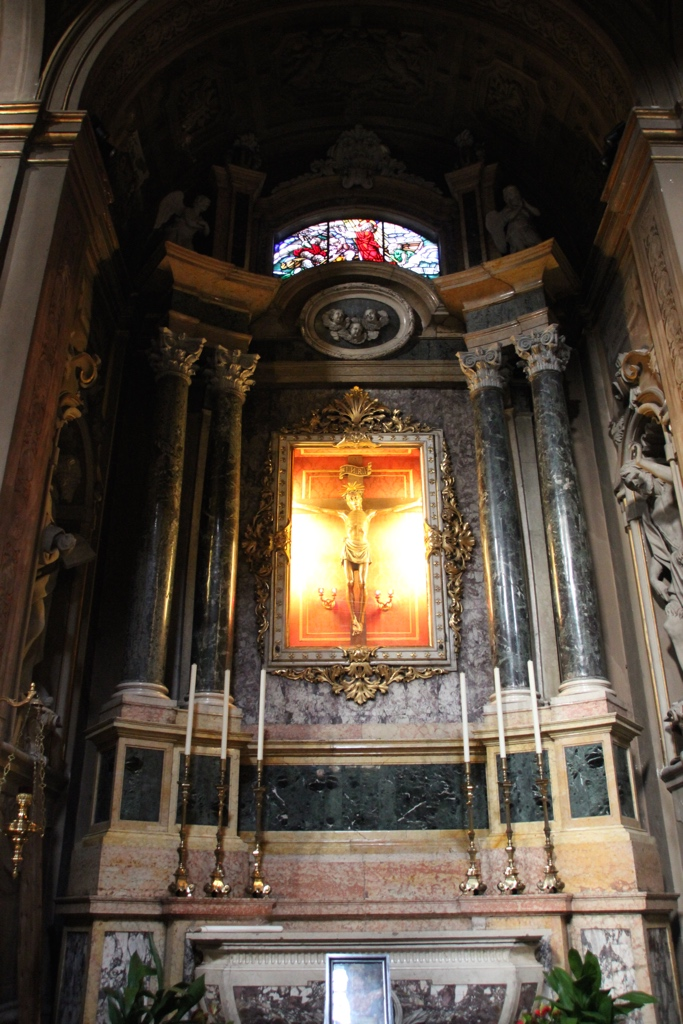

== Museum ==
The Cathedral Museum, housed in the former church of San Romano across the square, houses two works by Cosmè Tura (Annunciation and St. George and the Dragon), the Madonna della melagrana by Jacopo della Quercia and eight tapestries with stories of the two patron saints of Ferrara based on cartoons by Garofalo and Camillo Filippi.

== Burials ==
- Ippolito d'Este

== See also ==
- Roman Catholic Archdiocese of Ferrara-Comacchio

== Bibliography ==
- Cittadella, Luigi Napoleone (1864). Notizie relative a Ferrara per la maggior parte inedite (in Italian). Ferrara: D. Taddei. pp. 42–115.
