= Cesare Filippi =

Italian painter

Cesare Filippi (1536 – after 1602) was an Italian painter. He was the younger son and pupil of Camillo Filippi. Cesare was born at Ferrara in 1536. He assisted his father and brother Sebastiano in their works, and excelled in painting heads and grotesques in the ornamental style, although he sometimes attempted historical subjects, which are very feeble imitations of the style of his brother. Such is his picture of the Crucifixion in the church of La Morte.
