= Sebastiano Filippi =

Italian painter (1532–1602)

Sebastiano Filippi (or Bastianino; c. 1536 – 23 August 1602) was an Italian late Renaissance – Mannerist painter of the School of Ferrara.

== Biography ==
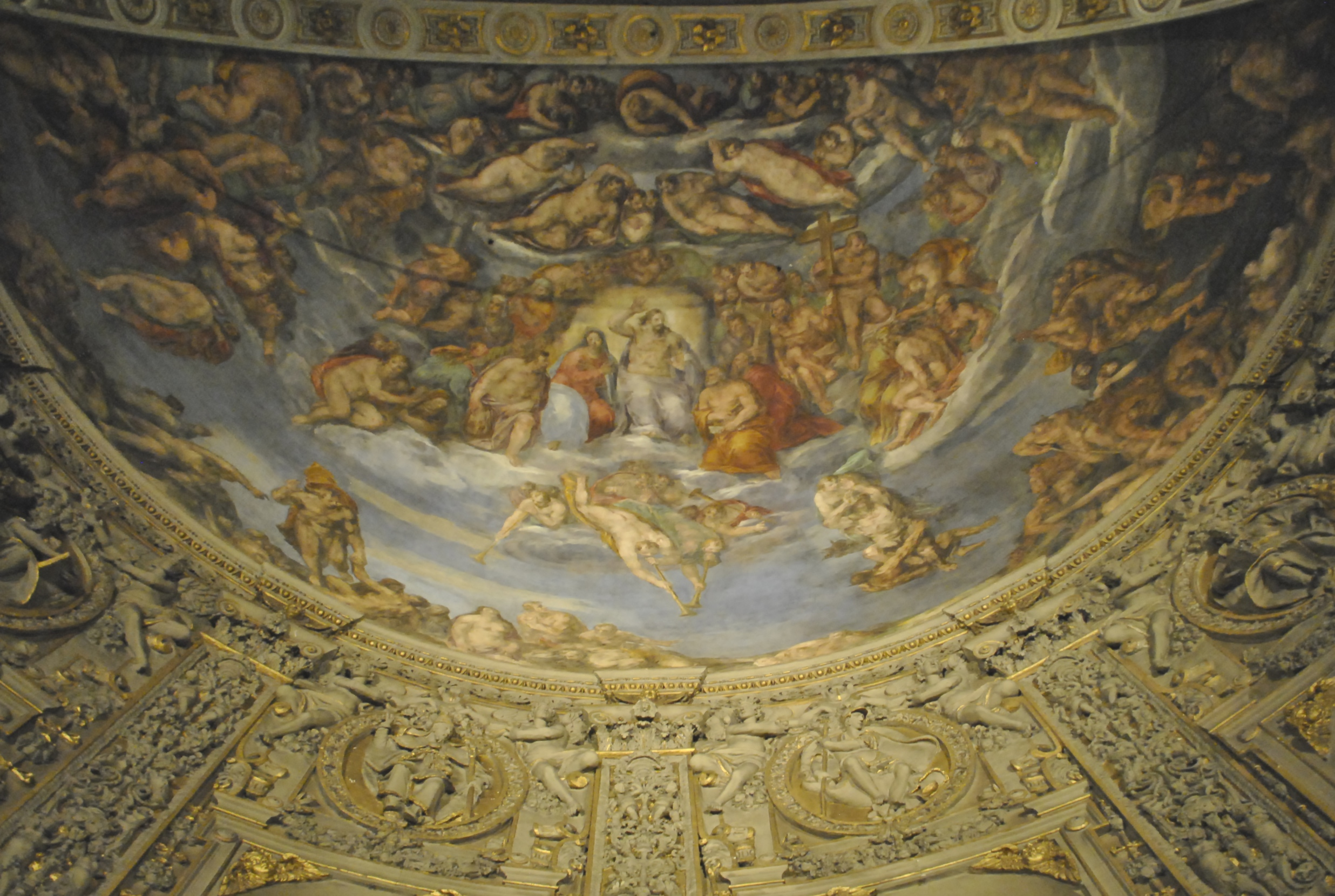
Sebastiano Filippi called Bastianino, Last Judgment, fresco, 1577–1581, apse Ferrara Cathedral

He was born in Lendinara to a painter, Camillo Filippi, who had worked under Dosso Dossi.

He initially likely apprenticed with his father and brother (Cesare Filippi), and is thought to have worked with them when they painted a processional standard Gonfalone for the Oratorio dell'Annunziata in Ferrara. He left Ferrara, dominated by the likes of Dosso Dossi, Il Garofalo, and Girolamo da Carpi, as a young man to find work in Rome.

In Rome, he is said to have been recommended by Jacopo Bonacossi, the Ferrarese doctor of the Pope, to enter training with Michelangelo. He worked for seven years under the master in Rome, then returned to Ferrara in 1553, where he enjoyed the general patronage of the arts by Duke Alfonso I d'Este and subsequently his son Alfonso II.

He painted a Madonna with Peter and Paul for the church of Vigarano. In the Castello Estense, along with his father and brother he frescoed somewhat whimsical depictions of games in the Salone dei GiochiSaletta dei Giochi, and Sala dell'Aurora. He is said to have collaborated with Leonardo Brescia in this assignment. He painted a Circumcision and an Annunciation for the church of San Agostino, Ferrara.

His 1565 painting, Birth of the Virgin, recalls the canvas of Andrea del Sarto. He painted large altarpieces for the Certosa of Ferrara, Vision of Saint Paul for Massa Lombarda, and Madonna and Child with Saints and Patrons in Rovigo in 1565. He painted a fresco of Last Judgment, highly imitative of Michelangelo, for both the carthusian church St. Christophorus (1578) and for the apse roof of Ferrara Cathedral (1577–1581).

He is said to have become blind late in life. His local prominence by then was shared with the painter Scarsellino. The painter Bartolomeo Faccini is said to have been his pupil in Ferrara, though others assign him as a pupil of Girolamo da Carpi.

== Sources ==
- Francis P. Smyth and John P. O'Neill (Editors in Chief) (1986). National Gallery of Art, Washington DC (ed.). The Age of Correggio and the Carracci: Emilian Painting of the 16th and 17th Centuries. pp. 61–63.
- Freedberg, Sydney J. (1993). Pelican History of Art (ed.). Painting in Italy, 1500–1600. Penguin Books Ltd. pp. 574–5.
- Magazine Article
