= Camillo Filippi =

Italian painter

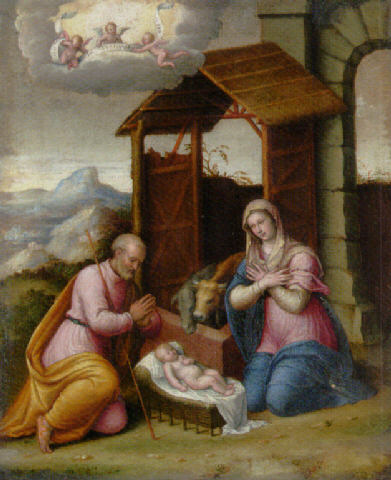
Nativity

Camillo Filippi (died 1574) was an Italian painter who flourished about the middle of the 16th century.

== Biography ==
Filippo was born in Ferrara. He was a disciple of Dosso Dossi, and painted historical works with some success. The Annunciation in the choir of the church of Santa Maria in Vado at Ferrara is attributed to Filippo; as is the Trinity in the Church of the Jesuits. He painted for the fresco cycle of Oratorio dell'Annunziata, Ferrara. His death took place in 1574. His son, Sebastiano Filippi (Il Bastianino), became a prominent local painter. His younger son Cesare Filippi was also a painter.
