= Ferrara =

Ferrara Fràra (Emilian)
- Comune
- Comune di Ferrara
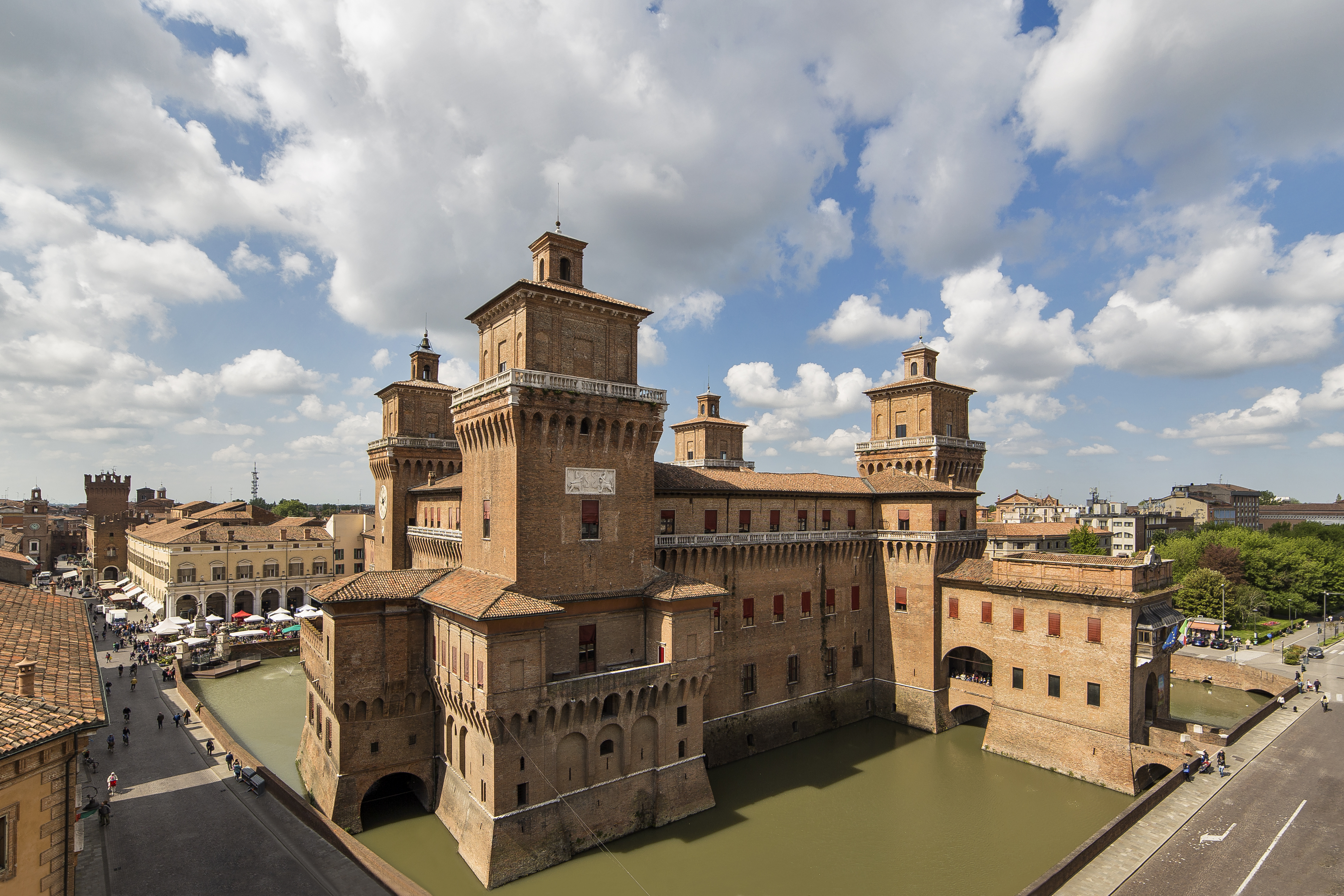
- The Castello Estense in the heart of Ferrara

- Flag Coat of arms

- Location within Italy Location within Emilia-Romagna
- Coordinates: 44°50′21″N 11°37′03″E
- Country: Italy
- Region: Emilia-Romagna
- Province: Ferrara (FE)
- Frazioni: Aguscello, Albarea, Baura, Boara, Borgo Scoline, Bova, Casaglia, Cassana, Castel Trivellino, Chiesuol del Fosso, Cocomaro di Cona, Cocomaro di Focomorto, Codrea, Cona, Contrapò, Corlo, Correggio, Denore, Focomorto, Francolino, Gaibana, Gaibanella, Sant'Egidio, Malborghetto di Boara, Malborghetto di Correggio, Marrara, Mezzavia, Monestirolo, Montalbano, Parasacco, Pescara, Pontegradella, Pontelagoscuro, Ponte Travagli, Porotto, Porporana, Quartesana, Ravalle, Sabbioni, San Bartolomeo in Bosco, San Martino, Spinazzino, Torre della Fossa, Uccellino, Viconovo, Villanova

Government
  - Mayor: Alan Fabbri (LN)

Area
  - Total: 405.16 km^{2} (156.43 sq mi)
- Elevation: 9 m (30 ft)

Population (2026)
  - Total: 129,048
  - Density: 318.51/km^{2} (824.94/sq mi)
- Demonyms: Ferraresi, Estensi
- Time zone: UTC+1 (CET)
  - Summer (DST): UTC+2 (CEST)
- Postal code: 44121 to 44124
- Dialing code: 0532
- Patron saint: St. George
- Saint day: 23 April
- Website: www.comune.ferrara.it

Ferrara (/fəˈrɑːrə/; Italian: [ferˈraːra]; Emilian: Fràra [ˈfraːra]) is a city and comune (municipality) in the region of Emilia-Romagna in northern Italy, capital of the province of Ferrara. As of 2026, with a population of 129,048, it is the 29th-largest city in Italy.

It is situated 44 kilometres (27 miles) northeast of Bologna, on the Po di Volano, a branch channel of the main stream of the Po River, located 5 km (3 miles) north. The town has broad streets and numerous palaces dating from the Renaissance, when it hosted the court of the House of Este. For its beauty and cultural importance, it has been designated by UNESCO as a World Heritage Site.

== History ==
=== Antiquity and Middle Ages ===
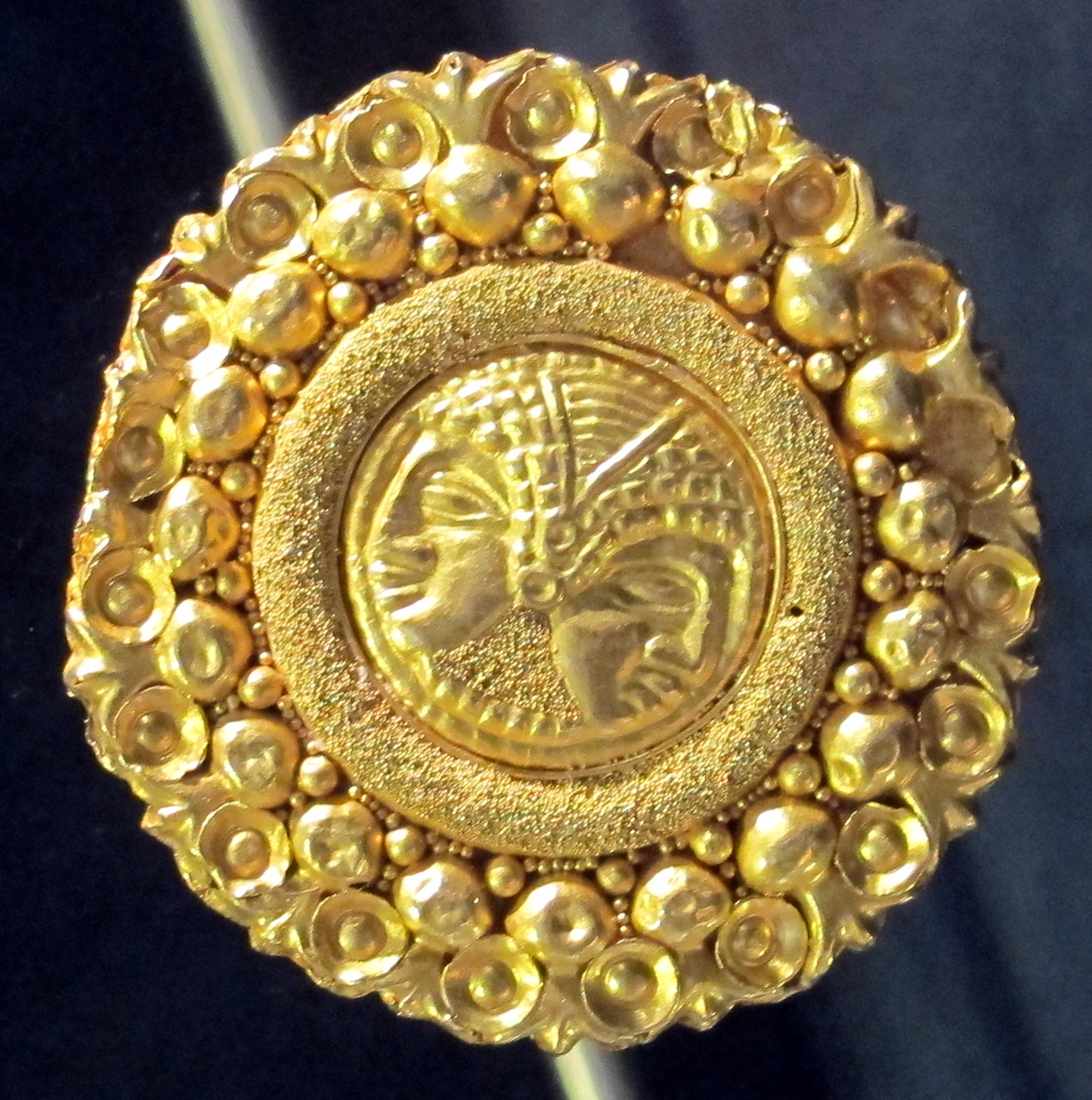
Etruscan jewellery is displayed at the National Archaeological Museum of Ferrara.

The first documented settlements in the area of the present-day Province of Ferrara date from the 6th century BC. The ruins of the Etruscan town of Spina, established along the lagoons at the ancient mouth of the Po river, were lost until modern times, when drainage schemes in the Valli di Comacchio marshes in 1922 first officially revealed a necropolis with over 4,000 tombs, evidence of a population centre that in Antiquity must have played a major role.

There is uncertainty among scholars about the proposed Roman origin of the settlement in its current location (Tacitus and Boccaccio refer to a "Forum Alieni"), for little is known of this period, but some archeologic evidence points to the hypothesis that Ferrara could have been originated from two small Byzantine settlements: a cluster of facilities around the Cathedral of St. George, on the right bank of the main branch of the Po, which then ran much closer to the city than today, and a castrum, a fortified complex built on the left bank of the river to defend against the Lombards.

Ferrara appears first in a document of the Lombard king Desiderius of 753 AD, when he captured the town from the Exarchate of Ravenna. Later the Franks, after routing the Lombards, presented Ferrara to the Papacy in 754 or 756. In 988 Ferrara was ceded by the Church to the House of Canossa, but at the death of Matilda of Tuscany in 1115 it became a free commune. During the 12th century the history of the town was marked by the wrestling for power between two preeminent families, the Guelph Adelardi and the Ghibelline Salinguerra. The powerful Imperial House of Este threw their decisive weight behind the Salinguerra and eventually reaped the benefits of victory for themselves. Thus, in 1264 Obizzo II d'Este was proclaimed lifelong ruler of Ferrara, taking the additional titles of Lord of Modena in 1288 and of Reggio in 1289. His rule marked the end of the communal period in Ferrara and the beginning of the Este rule, which lasted until 1598.

=== Early modern ===
In 1452 Borso d'Este was created duke of Modena and Reggio by Emperor Frederick III and in 1471 duke of Ferrara by Pope Paul II. Lionello and, especially, Ercole I were among the most important patrons of the arts in late 15th- and early 16th-century Italy. During this time, Ferrara grew into an international cultural centre, renowned for its architecture, music, literature and visual arts.

The architecture of Ferrara greatly benefited from the genius of Biagio Rossetti, who was requested in 1484 by Ercole I to draft a masterplan for the expansion of the town. The resulting "Erculean Addition" is considered one of the most important examples of Renaissance urban planning and contributed to the selection of Ferrara as a UNESCO World Heritage Site.

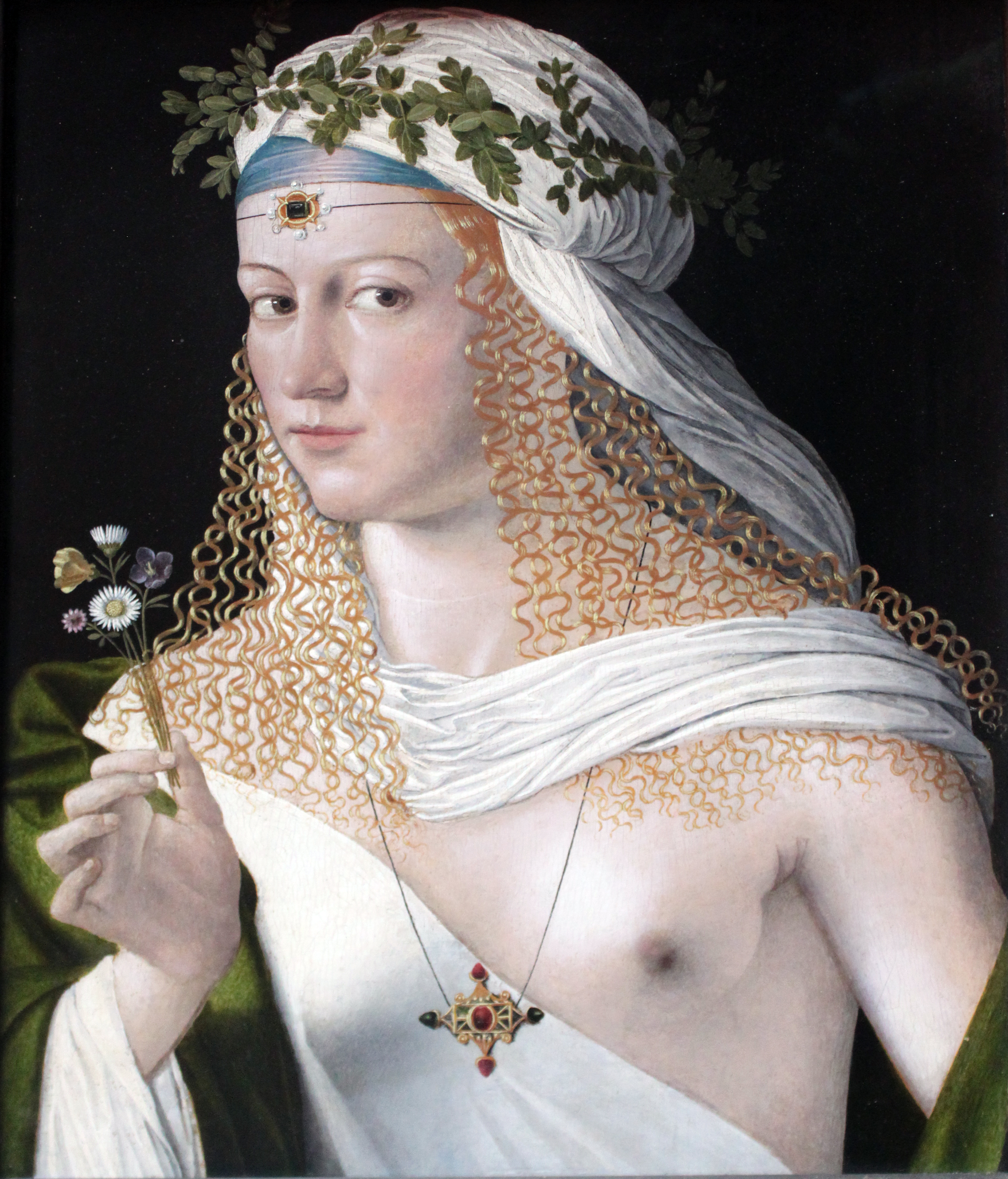
Flora, a Roman goddess, by Bartolomeo Veneto has been assumed to represent Lucrezia Borgia.

In spite of having entered its golden age, Ferrara was severely hit by a war against Venice fought and lost in 1482–84. Alfonso I succeeded to the throne in 1505 and married the notorious Lucrezia Borgia. He again fought Venice in the Italian Wars after joining the League of Cambrai. In 1509 he was excommunicated by Pope Julius II, but was able to overcome the Papal and Spanish armies in 1512 at the Battle of Ravenna. These successes were based on Ferrara's artillery, produced in his own foundry which was the best of its time.

Upon his death in 1534, Alfonso I was succeeded by his son Ercole II, whose marriage in 1528 to the second daughter of Louis XII, Renée of France, brought great prestige to the court of Ferrara. Under his reign, the Duchy remained an affluent country and a cultural powerhouse. However, an earthquake struck the town in 1570, causing the economy to collapse, and when Ercole II's son Alfonso II died without heirs in 1597, the House of Este lost Ferrara to the Papal States.

=== Late modern and contemporary ===
Ferrara, a university city second only to Bologna, remained a part of the Papal States for almost 300 years, an era marked by a steady decline; in 1792 the population of the town was only 27,000, less than in the 17th century. In 1805–1814 it was briefly part of the Napoleonic Kingdom of Italy, a client-state of the French Empire. After the 1815 Congress of Vienna, Ferrara was given back to the Pope, now guaranteed by the Empire of Austria. A bastion fort was erected in the 1600s by Pope Paul V on the site the Castel Tedaldo, an old castle at the south-west angle of the town, this was occupied by an Austrian garrison from 1832 until 1859. The fortress was completely dismantled following the birth of the Kingdom of Italy and the bricks were used for new constructions throughout the town.

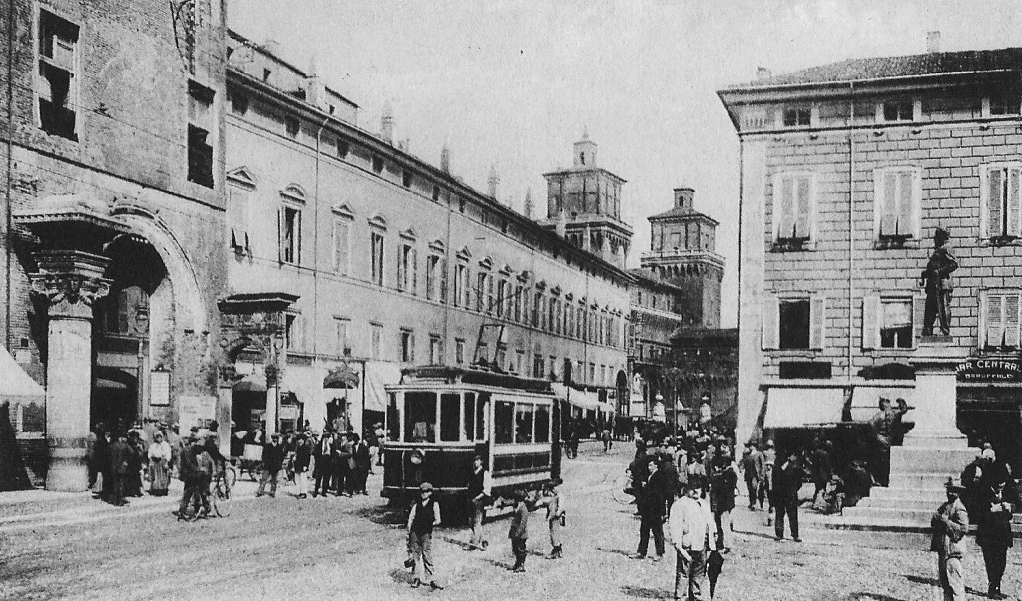
Downtown Ferrara around 1900

During the late 19th and early 20th centuries, Ferrara remained a modest trade centre for its large rural hinterland that relied on commercial crops such as sugar beet and industrial hemp. Large land reclamation works were carried out for decades with the aim to expand the available arable land and eradicate malaria from the wetlands along the Po delta. Mass industrialisation came to Ferrara only at the end of the 1930s with the set-up of a chemical plant by the Fascist regime that should have supplied the regime with synthetic rubber. During the Second World War Ferrara was repeatedly bombed by Allied warplanes that targeted and destroyed railway links and industrial facilities. After the war, the industrial area in Pontelagoscuro was expanded to become a giant petrochemical compound operated by Montecatini and other companies, that at its peak employed 7,000 workers and produced 20% of plastics in Italy. In recent decades, as part of a general trend in Italy and Europe, Ferrara has come to rely more on tertiary and tourism, while the heavy industry, still present in the town, has been largely phased out.

After almost 450 years, another earthquake struck Ferrara in May 2012 causing only limited damage to the historic buildings of the town and no victims.

== Geography ==
The town of Ferrara lies on the southern shores of the Po river, about 44 km (27 mi) north-east of the regional capital, Bologna, and 87 km (54 mi) south of Venice. The territory of the municipality, entirely part of the Padan plain, is overwhelmingly flat, situated on average just 9 metres (30 ft) above sea-level. The proximity to the largest Italian river has been a constant concern in the history of Ferrara, that has been affected by recurrent, disastrous floods, the latest occurring as recently as 1951. The Idrovia Ferrarese links the river Po from Ferrara to the Adriatic at Porto Garibaldi.

=== Climate ===
The climate of the Po valley is classified as humid subtropical (Cfa) under the Köppen climate classification, a type of climate commonly referred to as "warm temperate" that features mild winters and hot summers, heavy rains in spring and autumn but there is also a lot of rain even in the driest month of January for Ferrara.

Climate data for Ferrara (1991–2020 normals, extremes 1879–present)
Month	Jan	Feb	Mar	Apr	May	Jun	Jul	Aug	Sep	Oct	Nov	Dec	Year
Record high °C (°F)	18.8 (65.8)	21.7 (71.1)	27.9 (82.2)	30.7 (87.3)	34.5 (94.1)	37.5 (99.5)	38.6 (101.5)	39.7 (103.5)	35.0 (95.0)	30.6 (87.1)	23.2 (73.8)	19.0 (66.2)	39.7 (103.5)
Mean daily maximum °C (°F)	7.1 (44.8)	10.3 (50.5)	15.5 (59.9)	19.9 (67.8)	24.7 (76.5)	28.8 (83.8)	31.9 (89.4)	31.7 (89.1)	26.8 (80.2)	19.9 (67.8)	12.9 (55.2)	7.1 (44.8)	19.7 (67.5)
Daily mean °C (°F)	3.7 (38.7)	5.8 (42.4)	10.0 (50.0)	14.2 (57.6)	19.0 (66.2)	23.0 (73.4)	25.8 (78.4)	25.5 (77.9)	21.0 (69.8)	15.2 (59.4)	9.6 (49.3)	4.1 (39.4)	14.7 (58.5)
Mean daily minimum °C (°F)	0.3 (32.5)	1.2 (34.2)	4.4 (39.9)	8.4 (47.1)	13.3 (55.9)	17.2 (63.0)	19.7 (67.5)	19.4 (66.9)	15.1 (59.2)	10.4 (50.7)	6.3 (43.3)	1.1 (34.0)	9.7 (49.5)
Record low °C (°F)	−18.5 (−1.3)	−17.6 (0.3)	−5.7 (21.7)	−1.6 (29.1)	1.3 (34.3)	8.4 (47.1)	9.9 (49.8)	10.4 (50.7)	6.1 (43.0)	−1.5 (29.3)	−4.6 (23.7)	−13.6 (7.5)	−18.5 (−1.3)
Average precipitation mm (inches)	46 (1.8)	44 (1.7)	52 (2.0)	60 (2.4)	51 (2.0)	55 (2.2)	45 (1.8)	59 (2.3)	56 (2.2)	52 (2.0)	75 (3.0)	52 (2.0)	648 (25.5)
Average precipitation days (≥ 1.0 mm)	5	6	5	7	7	6	4	4	6	7	9	6	72
Source 1: Climi e viaggi
Source 2: Istituto Superiore per la Protezione e la Ricerca Ambientale (precipitation 1951–1980) Temperature estreme in Toscana (extremes)

== Demographics ==
Historical population
Year	Pop.	±%
1861	64,204	—
1871	67,306	+4.8%
1881	70,442	+4.7%
1901	81,301	+15.4%
1911	95,721	+17.7%
1921	106,768	+11.5%
1931	115,628	+8.3%
1936	119,265	+3.1%
1951	133,949	+12.3%
1961	152,654	+14.0%
1971	154,066	+0.9%
1981	149,453	−3.0%
1991	138,015	−7.7%
2001	130,992	−5.1%
2011	132,545	+1.2%
2021	129,872	−2.0%
Source: ISTAT

As of 2026, the population is 129,048, of which 47.9% are males, and 52.1% are females. Minors make up 12.0% of the population, and seniors make up 29.4%.

The city is predominantly Roman Catholic, with small Orthodox Christian adherents. The historical Jewish community is still surviving.

=== Immigration ===
As of 2025, immigrants make up 14.0% of the population. The 5 largest foreign countries of birth are Ukraine, Moldova, Romania, Albania, and Morocco.

== Government ==
The legislative body of the Italian communes is the City Council (Consiglio Comunale), which, in towns having between 100,000 and 250,000 population, is composed by 32 councillors elected every five years with a proportional system, contextually to the mayoral elections. The executive body is the City Committee (Giunta Comunale), composed by 12 assessors, that is nominated and presided over by a directly elected mayor. The current mayor of Ferrara is Alan Fabbri of the Lega Nord. The urban organisation is governed by the Italian Constitution (art. 114), the Municipal Statute and several laws, notably the Legislative Decree 267/2000 or Unified Text on Local Administration (Testo Unico degli Enti Locali).

The current division of the seats in the city council, after the 2019 local election, is the following:

- Lega Nord – 14
- Democratic Party – 8
- Ferrara Change (centre-right) – 3
- Forza Italia – 2
- Fratelli d'Italia – 1
- Gente a Modo (centre-left) – 1

== Cityscape ==
=== Architecture ===
Ferrara, City of the Renaissance, and its Po Delta
UNESCO World Heritage Site
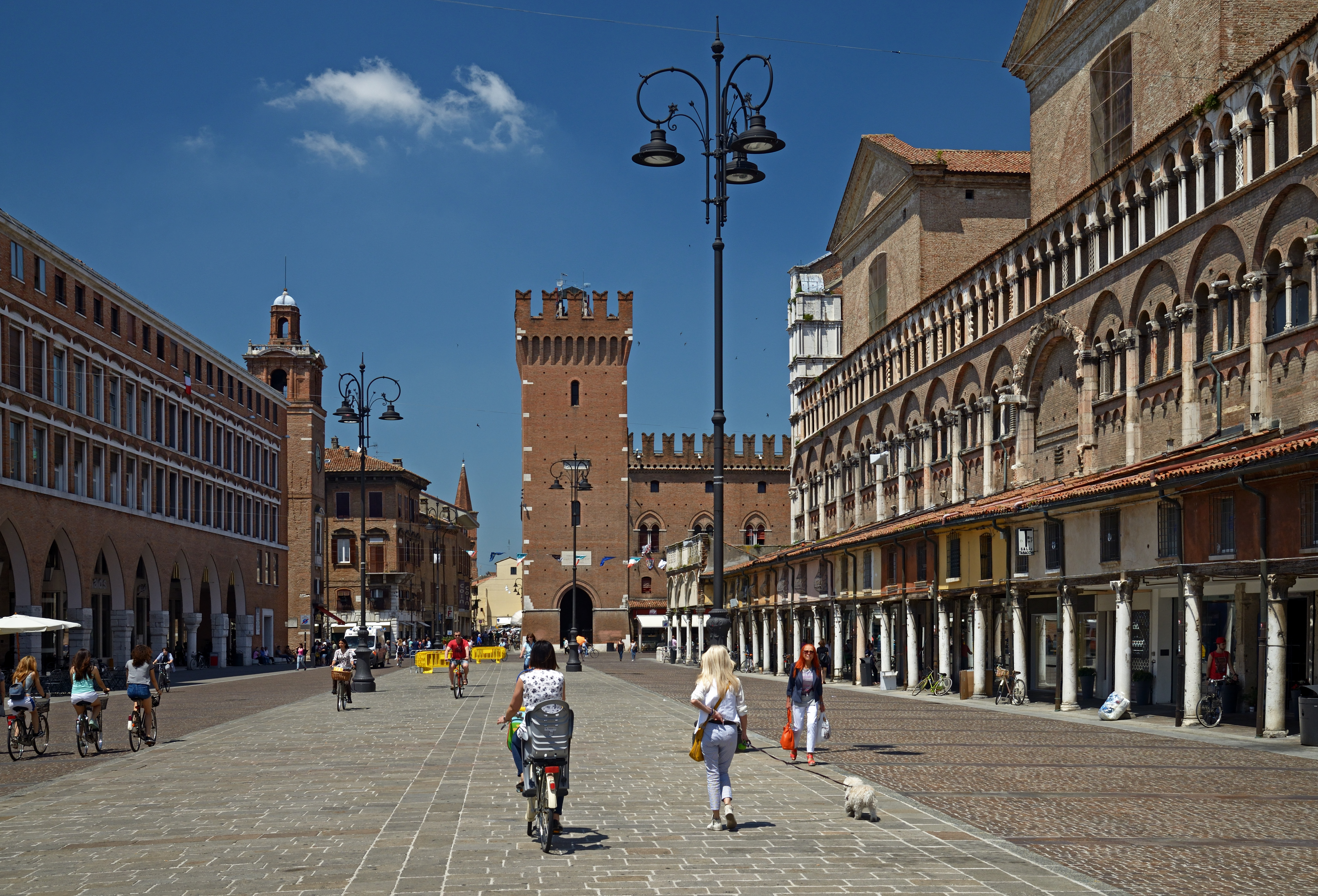
- Piazza Trento e Trieste
- Interactive map of Ferrara, City of the Renaissance, and its Po Delta
- Criteria: Cultural: ii, iii, iv, v, vi
- Reference: 733
- Inscription: 1995 (19th Session)

The imposing Este Castle, sited in the very centre of the town, is iconic of Ferrara. A very large manor house featuring four massive bastions and a moat, it was erected in 1385 by architect Bartolino da Novara with the function to protect the town from external threats and to serve as a fortified residence for the Este family. It was extensively renovated in the 15th and 16th centuries.

The Cathedral of Saint George, designed by Wiligelmus and consecrated in 1135, is one of the finest examples of Romanesque architecture. The duomo has been renovated many times through the centuries, thus its resulting eclectic style is a harmonious combination of the Romanesque central structure and portal, the Gothic upper part of the façade and the Renaissance campanile. The sculptures of the main portal are attributed to Nicholaus. The upper part of the main façade, with arcades of pointed arches, dates from the 13th century. The recumbent marble lions guarding the portals are copies of the originals, now in the cathedral's museum. An elaborated 13th-century relief depicting the Last Judgement is found in the second storey of the porch. The interior was restored in baroque style in 1712. The marble campanile attributed to Leon Battista Alberti was initiated in 1412 but is still incomplete, missing one projected additional storey and a dome, as it can be observed from numerous historical prints and paintings on the subject.

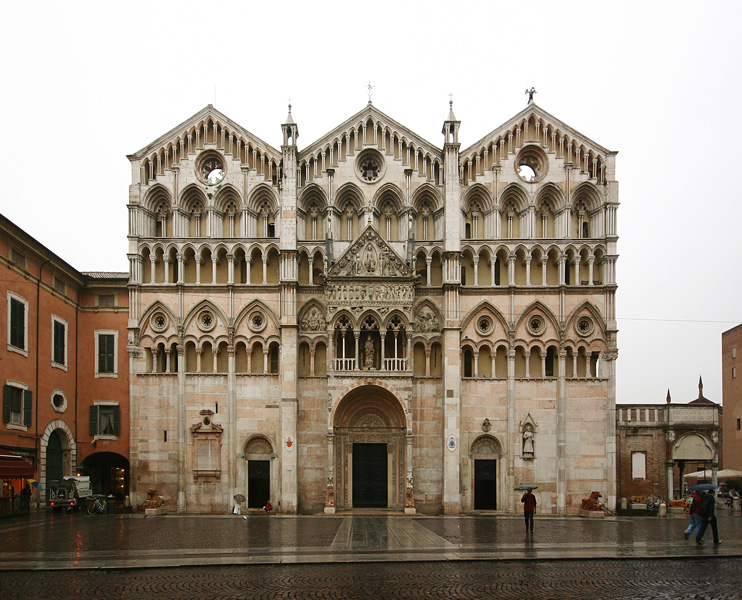
The Gothic façade of the Cathedral

Near the cathedral and the castle also lies the 15th-century city hall, that served as an earlier residence of the Este family, featuring a grandiose marble flight of stairs and two ancient bronze statues of Niccolò III and Borso of Este. The southern district is the town's oldest, crossed by a myriad of narrow alleys that date back to the Early Middle Ages. Casa Romei is perhaps the best-preserved medieval building in Ferrara. It was the private residence of merchant Giovanni Romei, related by marriage to the Este family, and likely the work of the court architect Pietrobono Brasavola. Thanks to the nuns of the Corpus Domini order, much of the original decorations in the inner rooms have been saved. The house features fresco cycles in the "Sala delle Sibille" ("room of sibyls"), an original terracotta fireplace bearing the coat of arms of Giovanni Romei in the adjoining Saletta dei Profeti ("room of the prophets"), depicting allegories from the Bible, and in other rooms, some of which were commissioned by cardinal Ippolito d'Este, paintings by the school of Camillo and Cesare Filippi (16th century).

Palazzo Schifanoia was built in 1385 for Albert V d'Este. The palazzo includes frescoes depicting the life of Borso d'Este, the signs of the zodiac and allegorical representations of the months. The vestibule was decorated with stucco mouldings by Domenico di Paris. The building also contains fine choir-books with miniatures and a collection of coins and Renaissance medals. The Renaissance Palazzo Paradiso, part of the Ferrara University library system, displays part of the manuscript of Orlando furioso and letters by Tasso as well as Ludovico Ariosto's grave. Its famous alumni include Nicolaus Copernicus and Paracelsus.

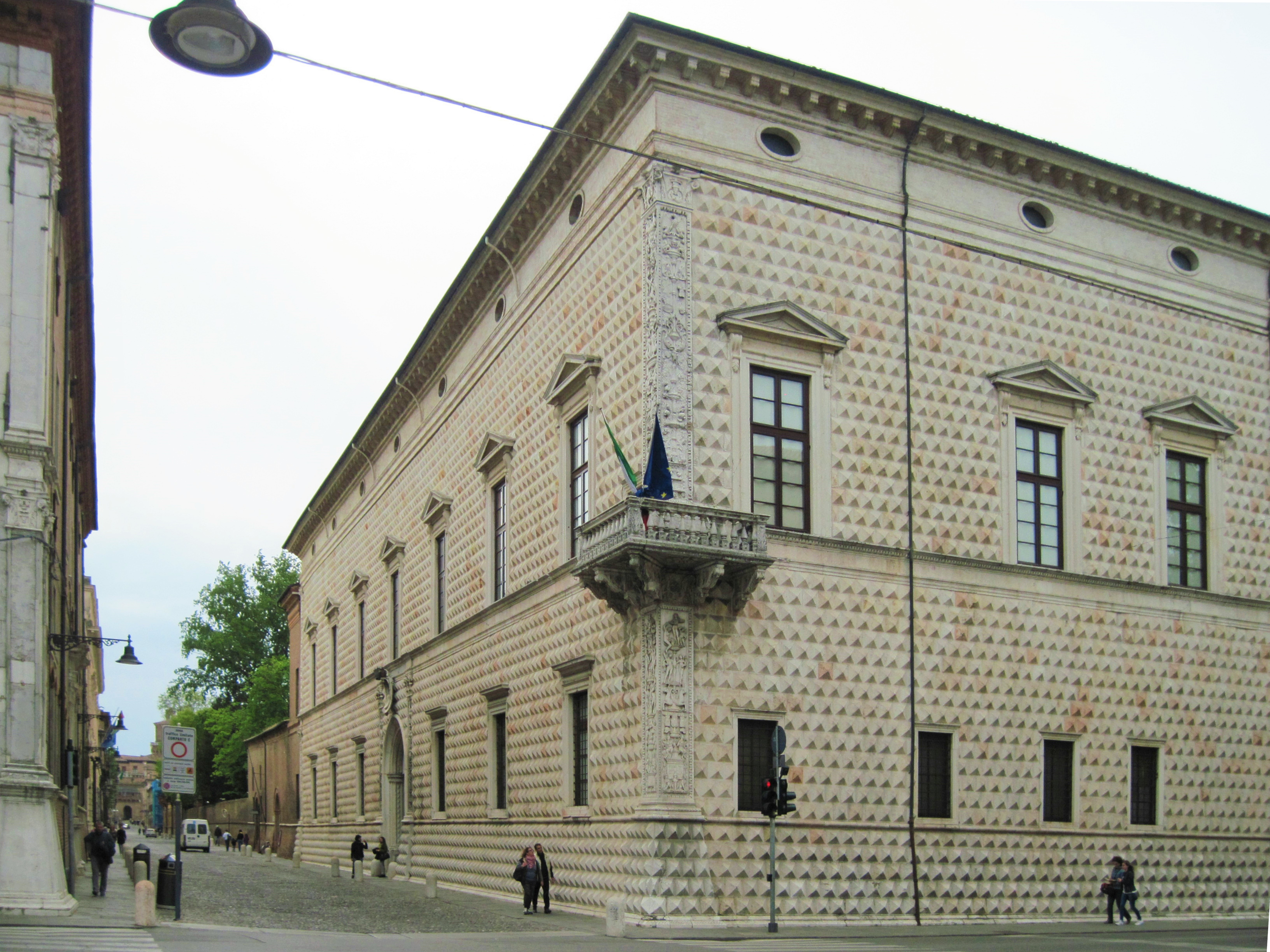
Palazzo dei Diamanti, seat of the National Gallery

The northern quarter, which was added by Ercole I in 1492–1505 thanks to the master plan of Biagio Rossetti, and hence called the Addizione Erculea, features a number of Renaissance palazzi. Among the finest is Palazzo dei Diamanti ("Diamond Palace"), named after the diamond points into which the façade's stone blocks are cut. The palazzo houses the National Picture Gallery, with a large collection of the school of Ferrara, which first rose to prominence in the latter half of the 15th century, with Cosimo Tura, Francesco Cossa and Ercole dei Roberti. Noted masters of the 16th-century School of Ferrara include Lorenzo Costa and Dosso Dossi, the most eminent of all, Girolamo da Carpi and Benvenuto Tisi (il Garofalo). The district is also home to University of Ferrara Botanic Garden.

=== Parks and gardens ===
The town is still almost totally encircled by 9 kilometres (6 miles) of ancient brick walls, mostly built between 1492 and 1520. Today the walls, after a careful restoration, make up a large urban park around the town and are a popular destination for joggers and cyclists.

== Culture ==
=== Jewish community ===
The Jewish community of Ferrara is the only one in Emilia Romagna with a continuous presence from the Middle Ages to the present day. It played an important role when Ferrara enjoyed its greatest splendor in the 15th and 16th century, with the duke Ercole I d'Este. The situation of the Jews deteriorated in 1598, when the Este dynasty moved to Modena and the city came under papal control. The Jewish settlement, located in three streets forming a triangle near the cathedral, became a ghetto in 1627. Apart from a few years under Napoleon and during the 1848 revolution, the ghetto lasted until Italian unification in 1859.

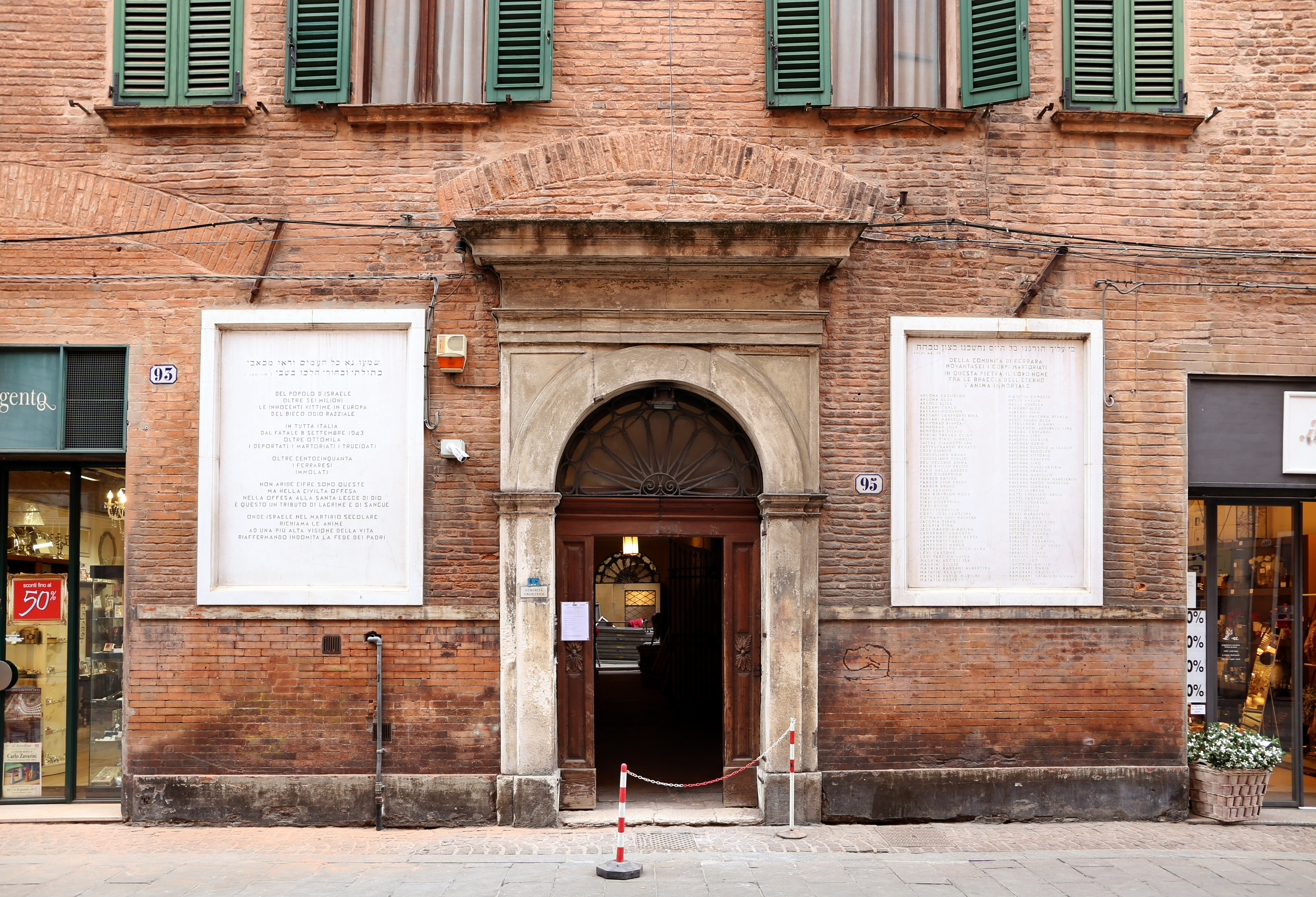
The town's Synagogue, established in 1485

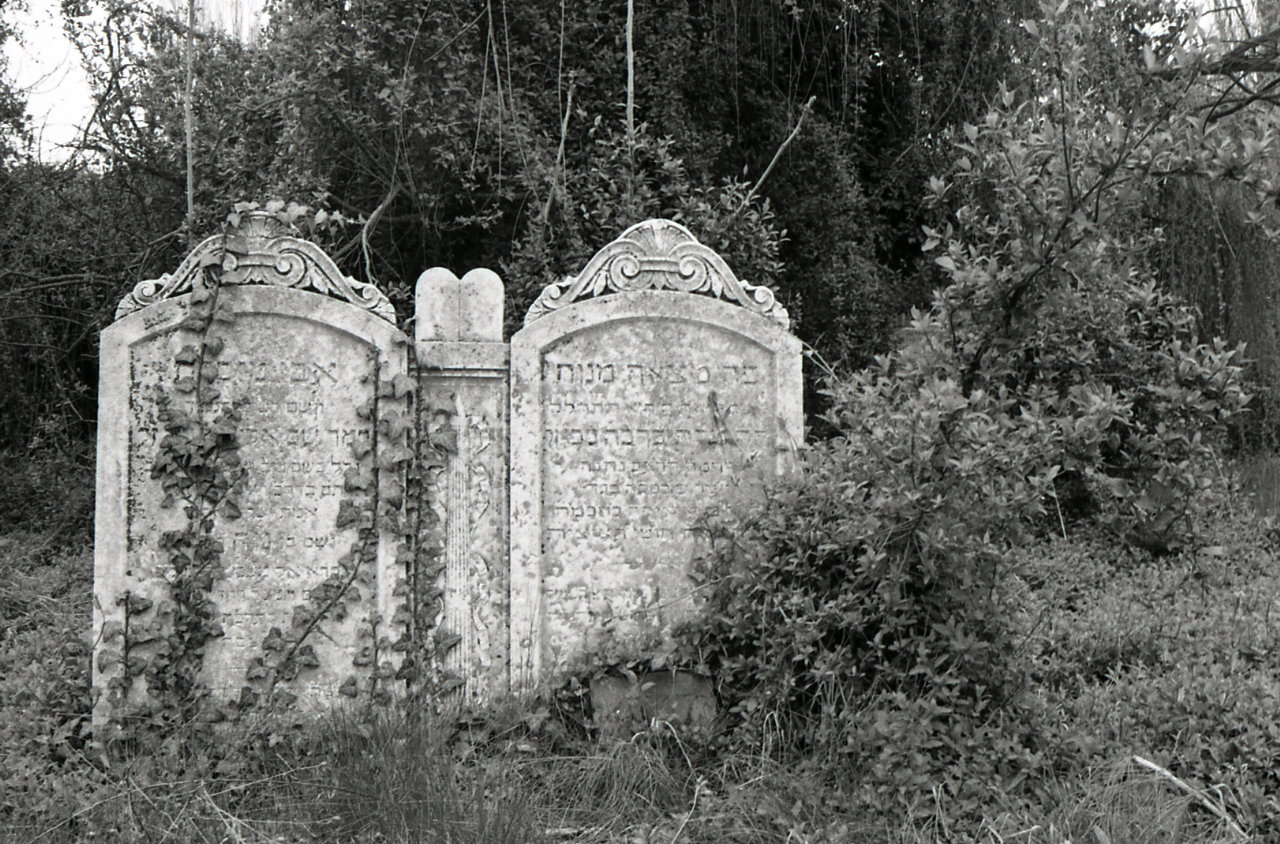
Graves in the Jewish cemetery

In 1799, the Jewish community saved the city from sacking by troops of the Holy Roman Empire. During the spring of 1799, the city had fallen into the hands of the Republic of France, which established a small garrison there. On 15 April, Lieutenant Field Marshal Johann von Klenau approached the fortress with a modest mixed force of Austrian cavalry, artillery and infantry augmented by Italian peasant rebels, commanded by Count Antonio Bardaniand and demanded its capitulation. The commander refused. Klenau blockaded the city, leaving a small group of artillery and troops to continue the siege. For the next three days, Klenau patrolled the countryside, capturing the surrounding strategic points of Lagoscuro, Borgoforte and the Mirandola fortress. The besieged garrison made several sorties from the Saint Paul's Gate, which were repulsed by the insurgent peasants. The French attempted two rescues of the beleaguered fortress: the first, on 24 April, when a force of 400 Modenese was repulsed at Mirandola and the second, General Montrichard tried to raise the city-blockade by advancing with a force of 4,000. Finally, at the end of the month, a column led by Pierre-Augustin Hulin reached and relieved the fortress.

Klenau took possession of the town on 21 May, and garrisoned it with a light battalion. The Jewish residents of Ferrara paid 30,000 ducats to prevent the pillage of the city by Klenau's forces; this was used to pay the wages of Gardani's troops. Although Klenau held the town, the French still possessed the town's fortress. After making the standard request for surrender at 08:00, which was refused, Klenau ordered a barrage from his mortars and howitzers. After two magazines caught fire, the commandant was summoned again to surrender; there was some delay, but a flag of truce was sent at 21:00, and the capitulation was concluded at 01:00 the next day. Upon taking possession of the fortress, Klenau found 75 new artillery pieces, plus ammunition and six months worth of provisions.

In 1938, Mussolini's fascist government instituted racial laws reintroducing segregation of Jews which lasted until the end of the German occupation. During the Second World War, 96 of Ferrara's 300 Jews were deported to German concentration and death camps; five survived. The Italian Jewish writer, Giorgio Bassani, was from Ferrara. His celebrated book, The Garden of the Finzi-Continis, was published in Italian as Giardino dei Finzi-Contini, 1962, by Giulio Einaudi editore s.p.a. It was made into a film by Vittorio de Sica in 1970.

During WWII, the Este Castle, adjacent to the Corso Roma, now known as the Corso Martiri della Libertà, was the site of an infamous massacre in 1943.

On 13 December 2017, the first day of Hanukkah, Italy's Museum of Italian Judaism and the Shoah opened on the site of a restored two-story brick prison built in 1912 that counted Jews among its detainees during the Fascist period. This is the initial phase of a project—known as MEIS, after its initials in Italian—to be completed in 2021, with additional buildings that will create a major Jewish cultural hub and add exhibits focusing on the Jews in the Italian Renaissance and the Shoah.

=== Visual art ===
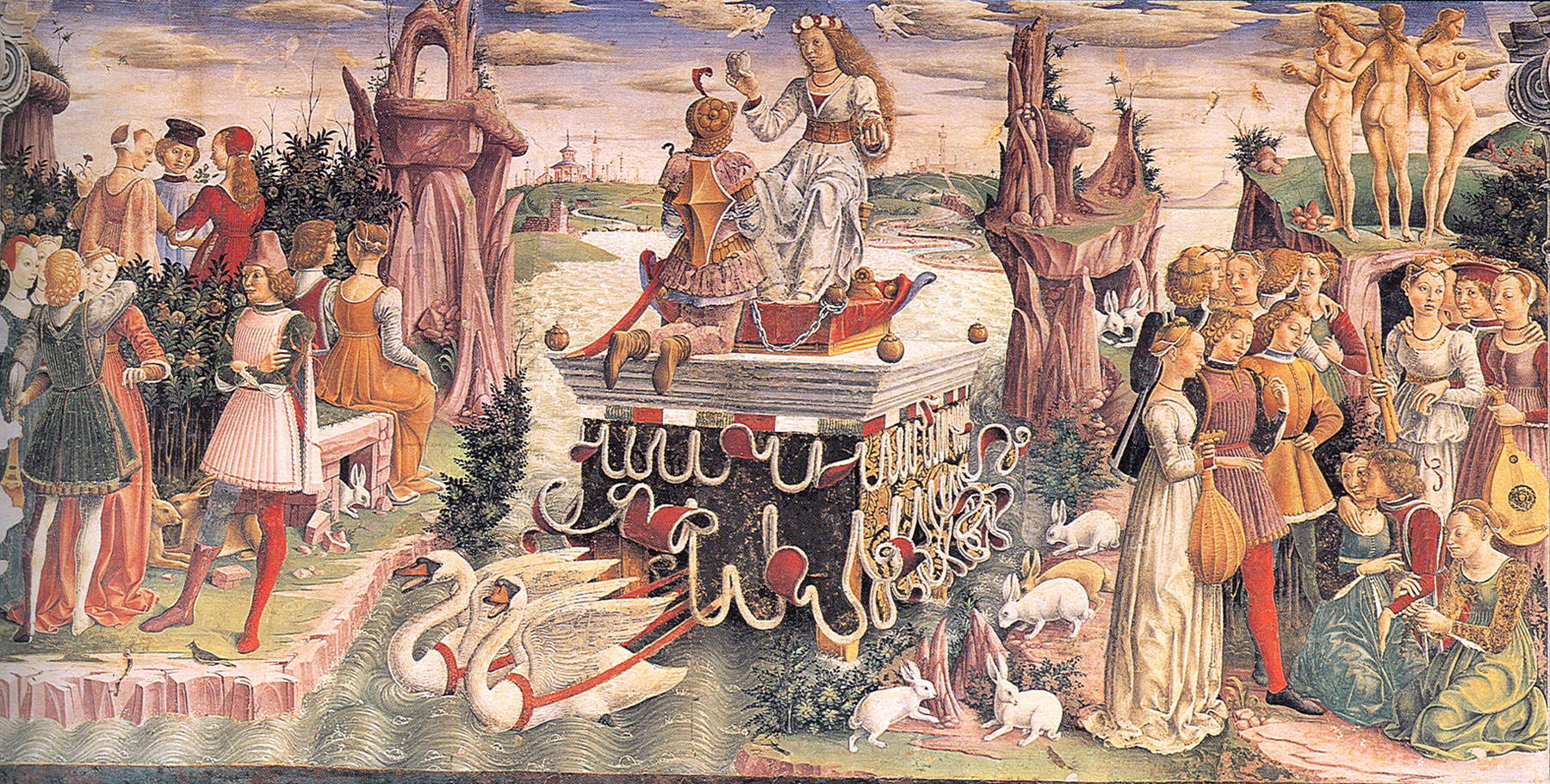
Francesco del Cossa's "May" from the "Salone dei Mesi" ("Great hall of the months") in Palazzo Schifanoia, circa 1470

During the Renaissance the Este family, well known for its patronage of the arts, welcomed a great number of artists, especially painters, that formed the so-called School of Ferrara. The astounding list of painters and artists includes the names of Andrea Mantegna, Vicino da Ferrara, Giovanni Bellini, Leon Battista Alberti, Pisanello, Piero della Francesca, Battista Dossi, Dosso Dossi, Cosmé Tura, Francesco del Cossa and Titian. In the 19th and 20th centuries, Ferrara again hosted and inspired numerous painters who grew fond of its eerie atmosphere. Among them Giovanni Boldini, Filippo de Pisis and Giorgio de Chirico. A large collection of paintings is displayed in the National Gallery of Palazzo dei Diamanti.

=== Literature ===
The Renaissance literary men and poets Torquato Tasso (author of Jerusalem Delivered), Ludovico Ariosto (author of the romantic epic poem Orlando Furioso) and Matteo Maria Boiardo (author of the grandiose poem of chivalry and romance Orlando Innamorato) lived and worked at the court of Ferrara during the 15th and 16th century.

The Ferrara Bible was a 1553 publication of the Ladino version of the Tanakh used by Sephardi Jews. It was paid for and made by Yom-Tob ben Levi Athias (the Spanish Marrano Jerónimo de Vargas, as typographer) and Abraham ben Salomon Usque (the Portuguese Jew Duarte Pinhel, as translator), and was dedicated to Ercole II d'Este. In the 20th century, Ferrara was the home and workplace of writer Giorgio Bassani, well known for his novels that were often adapted for cinema (The Garden of the Finzi-Continis, Long Night in 1943). In historical fiction, British author Sarah Dunant set her 2009 novel Sacred Hearts in a convent in Ferrara.

=== Religion ===
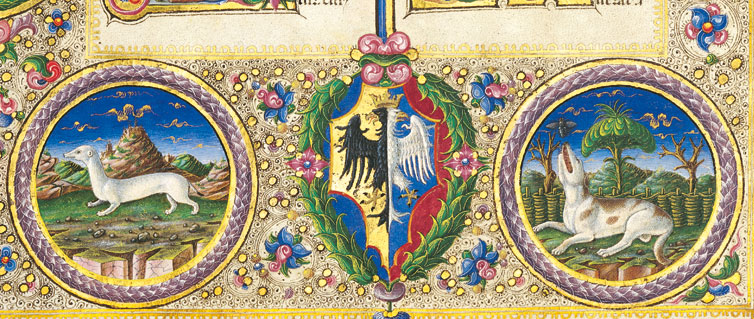
A page from Borso d'Este Bible

Ferrara gave birth to Girolamo Savonarola, the famous medieval Dominican priest and leader of Florence from 1494 until his execution in 1498. He was known for his book burning, destruction of what he considered immoral art, and hostility to the Renaissance. He vehemently preached against the moral corruption of much of the clergy at the time, and his main opponent was Pope Alexander VI (Rodrigo Borgia).

During the time that Renée of France was Duchess of Ferrara, her court attracted Protestant thinkers such as John Calvin and Olympia Fulvia Morata. The court became hostile to Protestant sympathizers after the marriage of Renée's daughter Anna d'Este to the fervently Catholic Duke of Guise.

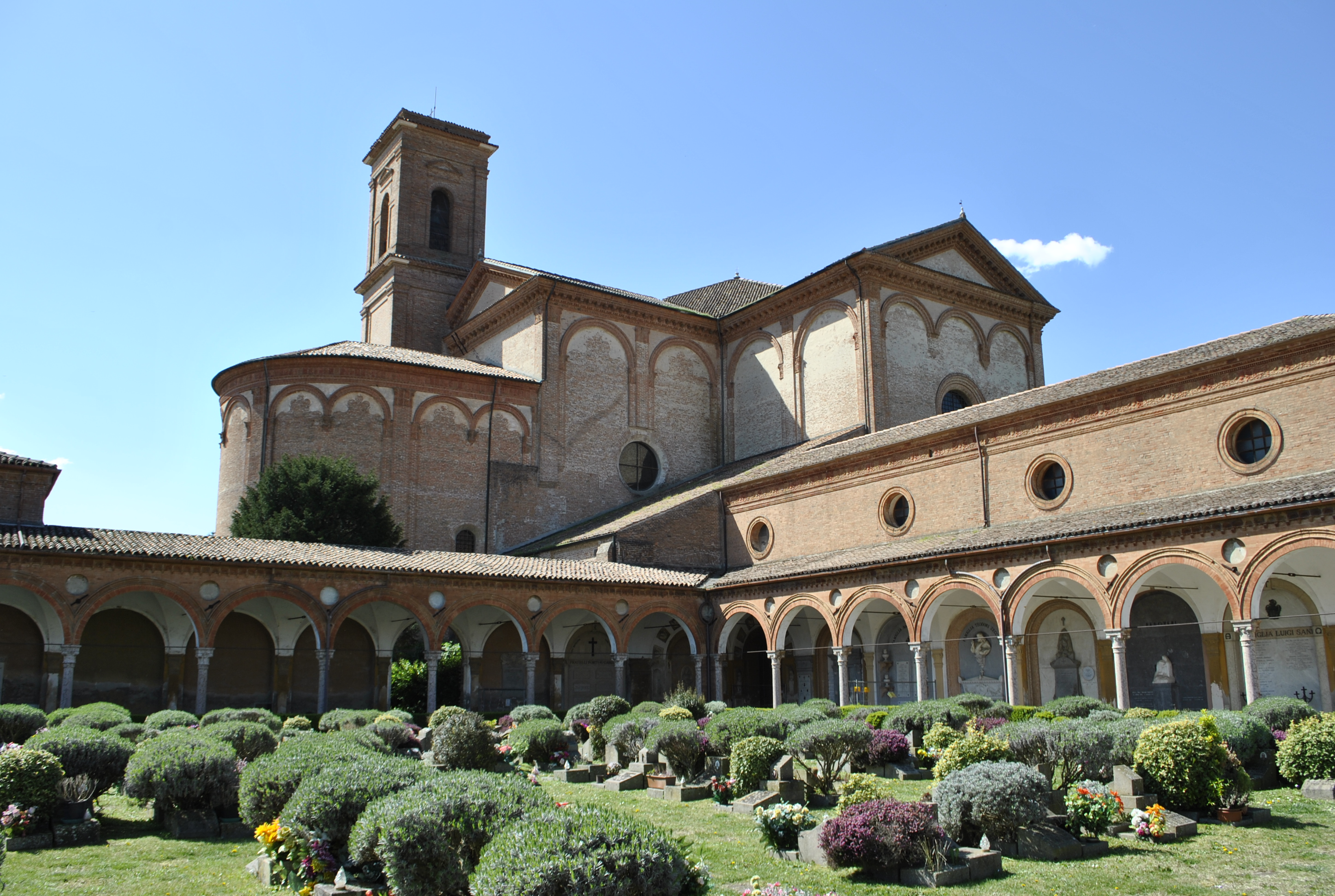
San Cristoforo Church and portion of the cemetery

The Church of San Cristoforo alla Certosa, former monastic church of the Ferrara Charterhouse (Italian: Certosa di Ferrara), dates from 1498 and remains on the site of a former charterhouse or Carthusian monastery, sponsored by the Duke Borso d'Este in 1452. After being suppressed in the time of Napoleon, the church was reconsecrated in 1813, and a large public cemetery was inaugurated on the site the same year.

=== Music ===
The Ferrarese musician Girolamo Frescobaldi was one of the most important composers of keyboard music in the late Renaissance and early Baroque periods. His masterpiece Fiori musicali (Musical Flowers) is a collection of liturgical organ music first published in 1635. It became the most famous of Frescobaldi's works and was studied centuries after his death by numerous composers, including Johann Sebastian Bach. Maurizio Moro (15??–16??) an Italian poet of the 16th century best known for madrigals is thought to have been born in Ferrara.

=== Cinema ===
Ferrara is the birthplace of Italian film directors Michelangelo Antonioni and Florestano Vancini. The latter shot in Ferrara his 1960 film Long Night in 1943. The town was also the setting of the famous 1970 movie The Garden of the Finzi-Continis by Vittorio De Sica, that tells the vicissitudes of a rich Jewish family during the dictatorship of Benito Mussolini and World War II. Furthermore, Wim Wenders and Michelangelo Antonioni's Beyond the Clouds in (1995) and Ermanno Olmi's The Profession of Arms in (2001), a film about the last days of Giovanni dalle Bande Nere, were also shot in Ferrara.

In the third season of Medici (TV Series), Girolamo Riario's men seize Ferrara, 100 miles from Florence and takes their salt. Based on the actions by Riario, Pope Sixtus IV condemns Riario and accepts Lorenzo's invitation to a peace conference in Bagnolo. The attack by Riario’s men on Ferrara was filmed at Castle of Oliveto in Castelfiorentino, once the residence of the noble Pucci family of Florence.

=== Festivals ===
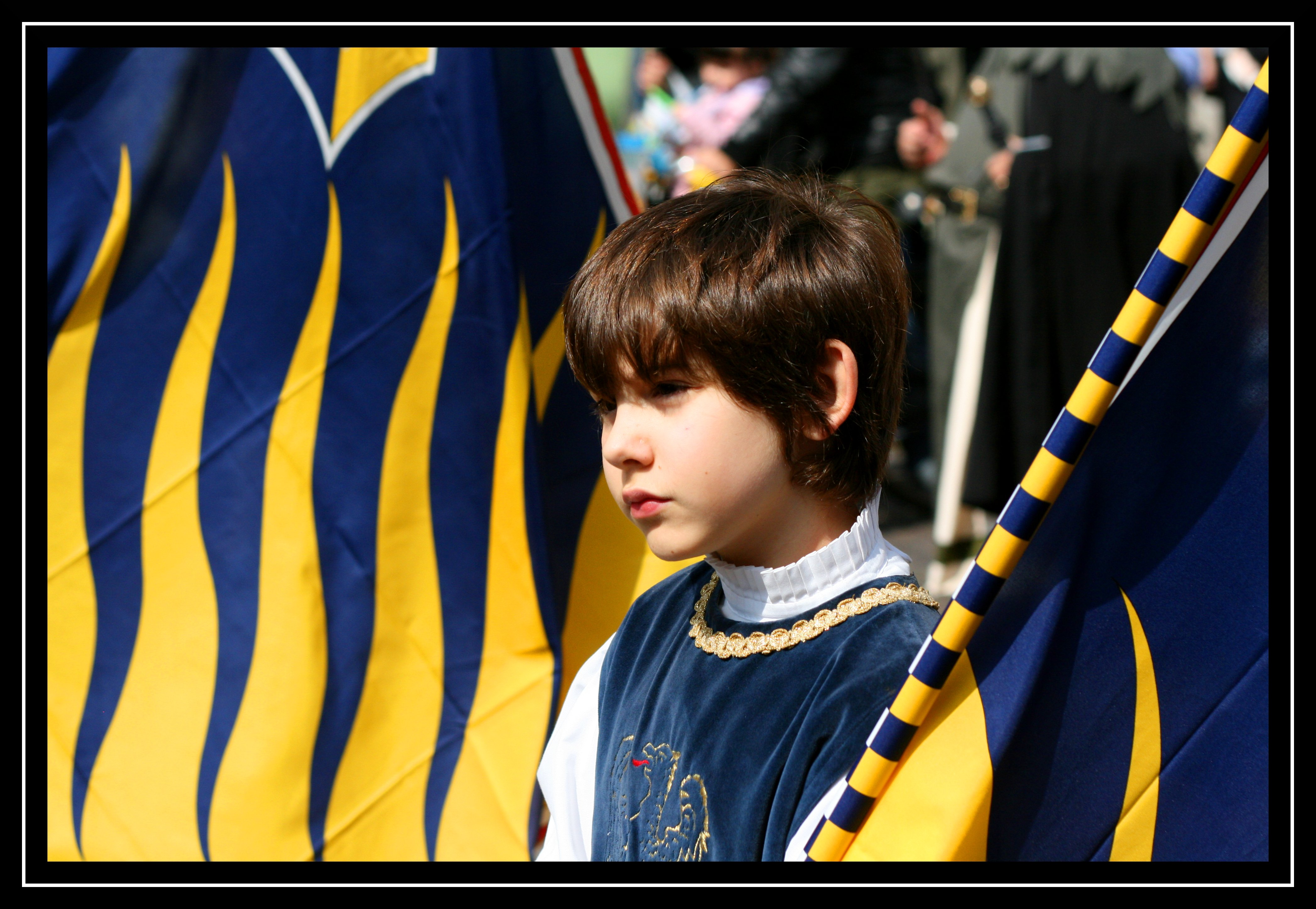
A child dressed up for the Palio

The Palio of St. George is a medieval-themed horse race held every last Sunday of May. Established in 1279, it is probably the oldest such competition in the world. The Ferrara Buskers Festival is a non-competitive parade of street musicians from all over the world. At the 2017 edition, more than 1,000 artists from 35 different nations took part in the festival, including dancers, clowns, equilibrists, jugglers and other original performers. Additionally, the town hosts the yearly Ferrara Balloons Festival, a large hot-air balloon show.

=== Sport ===
The town's football team, SPAL, was established in 1907. In 2017 it was promoted to Serie A, Italy's top-level football league, after a 49-year absence. Its home ground is Paolo Mazza Memorial Stadium, with a capacity of 16,134. The club went into liquidation at the end of the 2024/2025 season, and a new club Ars et Labor Ferrara was founded and currently competes in the regional Eccellenza Emilia-Romagna league, the fifth level in Italian football.

Ferrara's basketball team Kleb Basket Ferrara competes in the Serie A2 Basket and plays its home games at the Palasport di Ferrara.

=== Cuisine ===
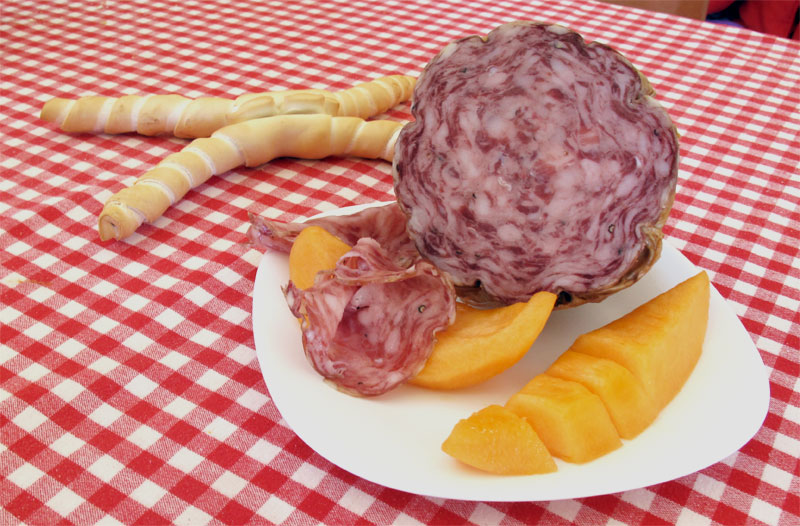
Some food items easily found in Ferrara: "coppia" bread, "zia" garlic salami and muskmelon

The culinary tradition of Ferrara features many typical dishes that can be traced back to the Middle Ages, and that sometimes reveals the influence of its important Jewish community.

The signature dish is cappellacci di zucca, special ravioli with a filling of butternut squash, Parmesan and flavored with nutmeg. It is served with a sauce of butter and sage or bolognese sauce. Another peculiar dish, that was allegedly cooked by Renaissance chef Cristoforo di Messisbugo, is pasticcio di maccheroni, a domed macaroni pie, consisting of a crust of sweet dough enclosing macaroni in a Béchamel sauce, studded with porcini mushrooms and ragù alla bolognese.

The traditional Christmas first course is cappelletti, large meat filled ravioli served in chicken broth. It is often followed by salama da sugo, a very big, cured sausage made from a selection of pork meats and spices kneaded with red wine.

Seafood is also an important part of the local tradition, that boast rich fisheries in the Po delta lagoons and Adriatic sea. Pasta with clams and grilled or stewed eel dishes are especially well-known. Popular food items include also zia garlic salami and the traditional coppia bread, protected by the IGP (protected geographical status) label. Not unusual is the typical kosher salami made of goose meat stuffed in goose neck skin.

Local patisserie include spicy pampepato chocolate pie, tenerina, a dark chocolate and butter cake, and zuppa inglese, a chocolate and custard pudding on a bed of sponge cake soaked in Alchermes. The clay terroir of the area, an alluvial plain created by the river Po, is not ideal for wine; a notable exception is Bosco Eliceo (DOC) wine, made from grapes cultivated on the sandy coast line.

== Transport ==
=== Air ===
The city does not have its own airport. The nearest airports are:

- Bologna Guglielmo Marconi Airport, located 50 km (31 mi) south
- Verona Villafranca Airport, located 112 km (70 mi) north west
- Venice Marco Polo Airport, located 117 km (73 mi) north east

=== Rail ===
Ferrara is served by Ferrara railway station. Opened in 1862, it forms part of the Padua–Bologna railway, and is also a terminus of three secondary railways, linking Ferrara with Ravenna, Rimini, Suzzara, and Codigoro.

== International relations ==
=== Twin towns – sister cities ===
Ferrara is twinned with:

- Broni, Italy
- Buenos Aires, Argentina
- Formia, Italy
- Giessen, Germany
- Highland Park, United States
- Kallithea, Greece
- Kaufbeuren, Germany
- Koper, Slovenia
- Krasnodar, Russia
- Lleida, Spain
- Prague 1, Czech Republic
- Saint-Étienne, France
- Sarajevo, Bosnia and Herzegovina
- Swansea, Wales, United Kingdom
- Szombathely, Hungary
- Toledo, United States

== See also ==
- Roman Catholic Archdiocese of Ferrara-Comacchio
