= Portrait of a Woman =

Portrait of a Woman may refer to the following paintings:

- Portrait of a Woman (Dosso Dossi), c.1530–1535, in the Musée Condé, Chantilly
- Portrait of a Woman (Hans Holbein the Elder), c.1515, in the Unterlinden Museum, Colmar
- Portrait of a Woman (Marie Larp), c.1635–1638, by Frans Hals, in the National Gallery, London
- Portrait of a Woman (Pollaiuolo), c.1475, in the Uffizi, Florence
- Portrait of a Woman (Sebastiano del Piombo), 1512, in the Uffizi, Florence
- Portrait of a Woman (van Vliet), 1641, in the Hermitage Museum, Saint Petersburg
- Portrait of a Woman (van der Weyden), 1435–1440, in the Gemäldegalerie, Berlin
- Portrait of a Lady (van der Weyden), also called Portrait of a Woman, c.1460, in the National Gallery of Art, Washington
- Portrait of a Woman (1903), Kees van Dongen

== See also ==
- The Portrait of a Lady (disambiguation)
- Female Portrait (Cranach), c.1530, in the Uffizi, Florence
