= The Portrait of a Lady (disambiguation) =

The Portrait of a Lady is a novel by Henry James.

The Portrait of a Lady may also refer to:

== Film and television ==
- The Portrait of a Lady (TV series), a 1968 British television series
- Fascination: Portrait of a Lady, a 1977 Japanese pornographic film
- The Portrait of a Lady (film), a 1996 film adaptation of James's novel by Jane Campion
- Portrait of a Lady on Fire, a 2019 French historical romantic drama film by Celine Sciamma
- The Portrait of a Lady, an upcoming British television series starring Nell Tiger Free

== Visual arts ==
Listed chronologically

- Portrait of a Lady (van der Weyden), a c. 1460 painting by Rogier van der Weyden
- Portrait of a Lady Known as Smeralda Brandini, a c. 1475 painting by Sandro Botticelli
- Portrait of a Lady (Titian), several works by Titian (16th century)
- a 1515 painting by Bernardino Luini
- Portrait of a Lady (Moroni), a c. 1556–1560 painting by Giovanni Battista Moroni
- a 16th century painting by Pier Francesco Foschi
- Portrait of a Lady (Contessa Colleoni), a painting by Fra Galgario (born Giuseppe Vittore Ghislandi, 1655–1743) missing 1945-2025
- an 18th century painting by Maria Verelst
- a 1912 painting by Giovanni Boldini
- Portrait of a Lady (Klimt), a 1916–17 painting by Gustav Klimt

== Literature ==
- "Portrait of a Lady" (poem), a 1915 poem by T. S. Eliot
- Portrait of a Lady (novel), a 1936 historical novel by the British writer Eleanor Smith
- "The Portrait of a Lady", a short story by Khushwant Singh

== Other uses ==
- Portrait of a Lady, a perfume by Dominique Ropion from Editions de Parfums Frédéric Malle

== See also ==
- Portrait of a Woman (disambiguation)
