= Virgin of the Assumption and St. Michael the Archangel =

Painting by Dosso and Battista Dossi

Archangel Michael fights the devil and the Virgin of the Assumption of the Angels
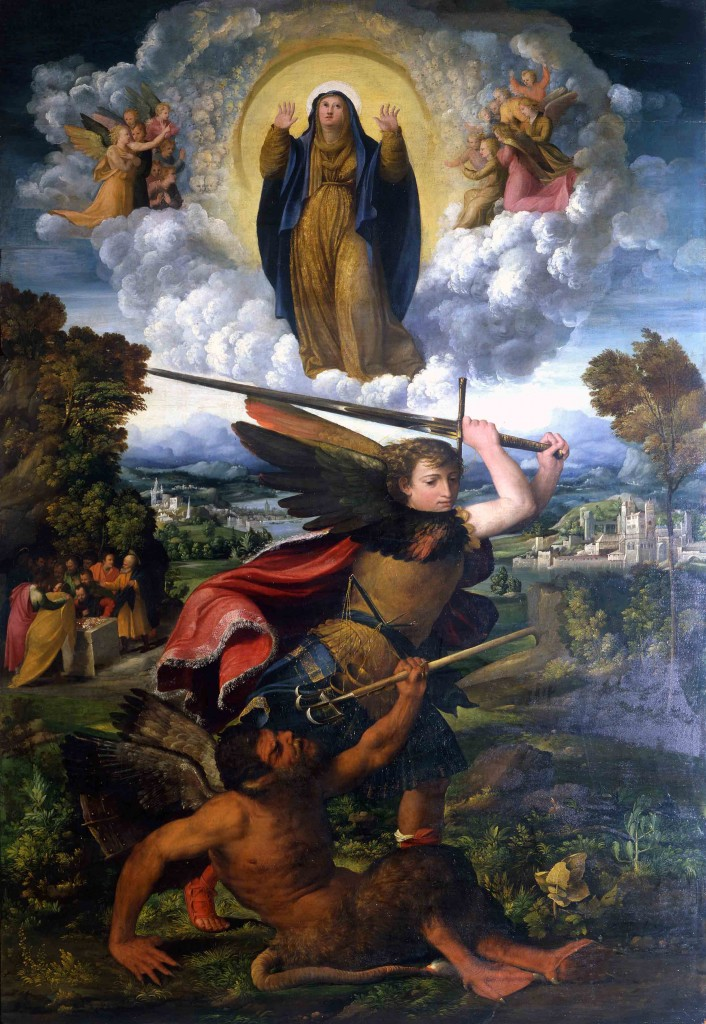
- Artist: Dosso Dossi and Battista Dossi
- Year: c. 1533 - 1534
- Medium: Oil on wood
- Dimensions: 246 cm × 166 cm (97 in × 65 in)
- Location: Galleria nazionale di Parma, Parma

Archangel Michael fights the devil and the Virgin of the Assumption of the Angels is an oil painting on canvas (243x166 cm) by the Italian Renaissance painters Dosso Dossi and Battista Dossi, dated to about 1533 to 1534 and preserved at the Galleria nazionale di Parma.

== Sources ==
- Fornari Schianchi, Lucia (1998). "Cinquecento e iconografia farnesiana". Galleria Nazionale di Parma, Catalogo delle opere. Milan: Franco Maria Ricci.
