= Gabriele Cappellini =

Italian painter

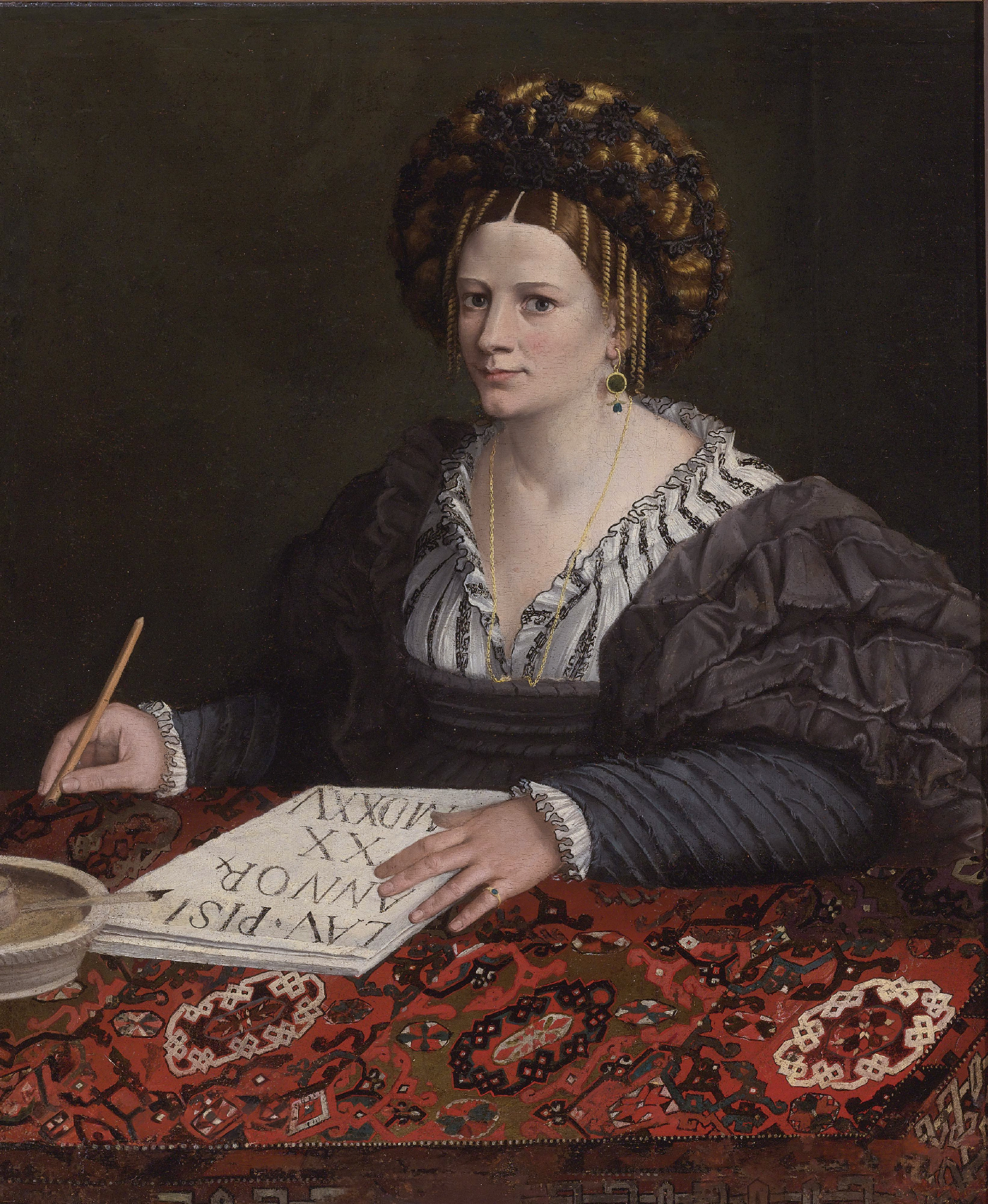
Laura Pisani by Gabriele Cappellini (1525)

Gabriele Cappellini was an Italian painter of the Renaissance. He was also called il Caligarino or il Calzolaretto (the little shoemaker), from his having first pursued that trade. He was born in Ferrara, and there trained under Dosso Dossi, he was active c. 1520. For the church of San Francesco, Ferrara he painted a St. Peter and St. James and for San Giovannino the principal altar-piece, representing The Virgin and Infant with several Saints.
