= Dosso Dossi =

Italian painter (c. 1489–1542)

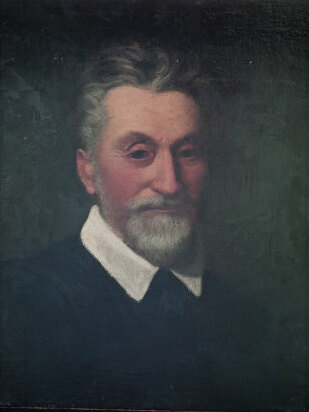
- Self-portrait
- Born: c. 1489; San Giovanni del Dosso, Mantua
- Died: 1542 (aged c. 53); Ferrara, Este
- Education: Lorenzo Costa
- Known for: Painting
- Movement: Italian Renaissance
- Patrons: Alfonso I d'Este, Duke of Ferrara, Ercole II d'Este, Duke of Ferrara

Giovanni di Niccolò de Luteri, better known as Dosso Dossi (c. 1489–1542) was an Italian Renaissance painter who belonged to the School of Ferrara, painting in a style mainly influenced by Venetian painting, in particular Giorgione and early Titian.

From 1514 to his death, he was court artist to the Este Dukes of Ferrara and of Modena, whose small court valued its reputation as an artistic centre. He often worked with his younger brother Battista Dossi, who had worked under Raphael. He painted many mythological subjects and allegories with a rather dream-like atmospheres, and often striking disharmonies in colour. His portraits also often show rather unusual poses or expressions for works originating in a court.

== Biography ==
Dossi was born in San Giovanni del Dosso, a village in the province of Mantua. His early training and life are not well documented; his father, originally of Trento, was a bursar (spenditore or fattore) for the Dukes of Ferrara. He may have had training locally with Lorenzo Costa or in Mantua, where he is known to have been in 1512. By 1514, he would begin three decades of service for dukes Alfonso I and Ercole II d'Este, becoming principal court artist. Dosso worked frequently with his brother Battista Dossi, who had trained in the Roman workshop of Raphael. The works he produced for the dukes included the ephemeral decorations of furniture and theater sets. He is known to have worked alongside il Garofalo in the Costabili polyptych. One of his pupils was Giovanni Francesco Surchi (il Dielai).

Dosso Dossi is known less for his naturalism or attention to design, and more for cryptic allegorical conceits in paintings around mythological themes, a favored subject for the humanist Ferrarese court (see also Cosimo Tura and the decoration of the Palazzo Schifanoia). Dossi employed eccentric distortions of proportion, which may appear caricature-like or even 'primitivist'. The art historian Sydney Freedberg sees this characteristic as an expression of the Renaissance aesthetic of sprezzatura (i.e. "studied carelessness", or artistic nonchalance). Dossi is also known for the atypical choices of bright pigment for his cabinet pieces. Some of his works, such as the Deposition have lambent qualities that suggest some of Correggio's works. Most of his works feature Christian and Ancient Greek themes and use oil painting as a medium.

The painting Aeneas in the Elysian Fields was part of the Camerino d'Alabastro of Alfonso I in the Este Castle, decorated with canvases depicting bacchanalia and erotic subjects including Feast of the Gods by Giovanni Bellini and Venus Worship by Titian. The frieze paintings were based on the Aeneid; this scene by Dossi is book 6, lines 635–709, wherein Aeneas is guided over the bridge into the Elysian Fields by the Cumaean Sibyl. Orpheus with the lyre flits in the forest; in the background are the ghostly horses of dead warriors.

In Hercules and the Pygmies, Hercules has fallen asleep after defeating Antaeus, and is set upon by an army of thumb-size pygmies, whom he defeats. He gathers them in his lion skin. Paintings depicting a powerful Hercules were commonly made for the then-ruler Duke Ercole II d'Este. The subjects of the Mythological Scene and Tubalcain are unknown.

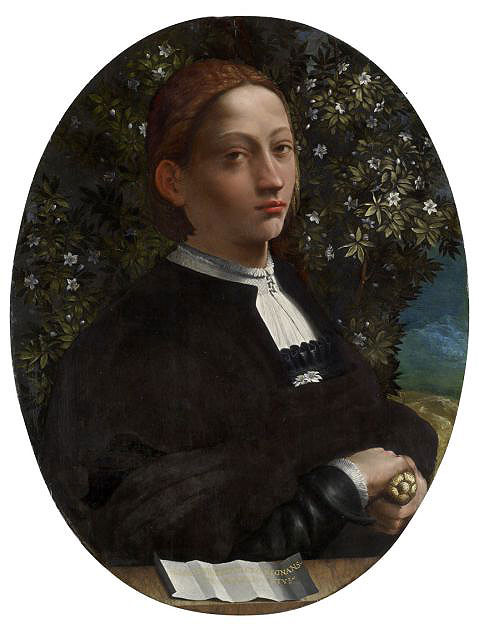
Portrait of a Youth, now claimed to be a portrait of Lucrezia Borgia by Dosso Dossi, National Gallery of Victoria.

Recently, "Portrait of a Youth" at the National Gallery of Victoria, has been identified by the museum as a portrait of Lucrezia Borgia by Dosso Dossi, having previously been regarded as the portrait of an unknown young male by an unknown painter.

In Ferrara, among his pupils were Gabriele Cappellini, Jacopo Panicciati, and Giovanni Surchi.

== Selected works ==
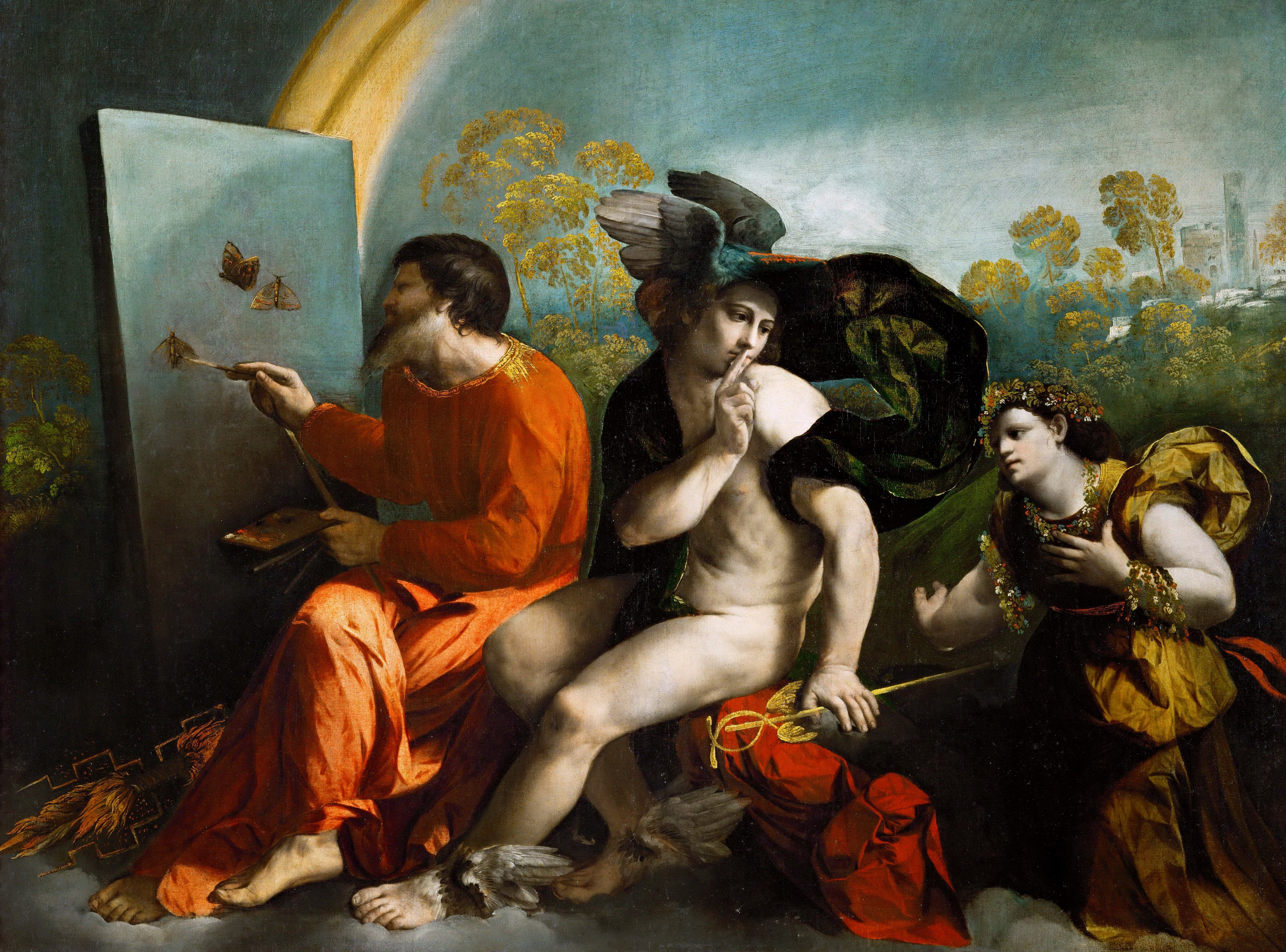
Jupiter Painting Butterflies, Mercury and Virtue, c. 3rd decade of the 16th century, Lanckoroński Collection, Wawel Castle

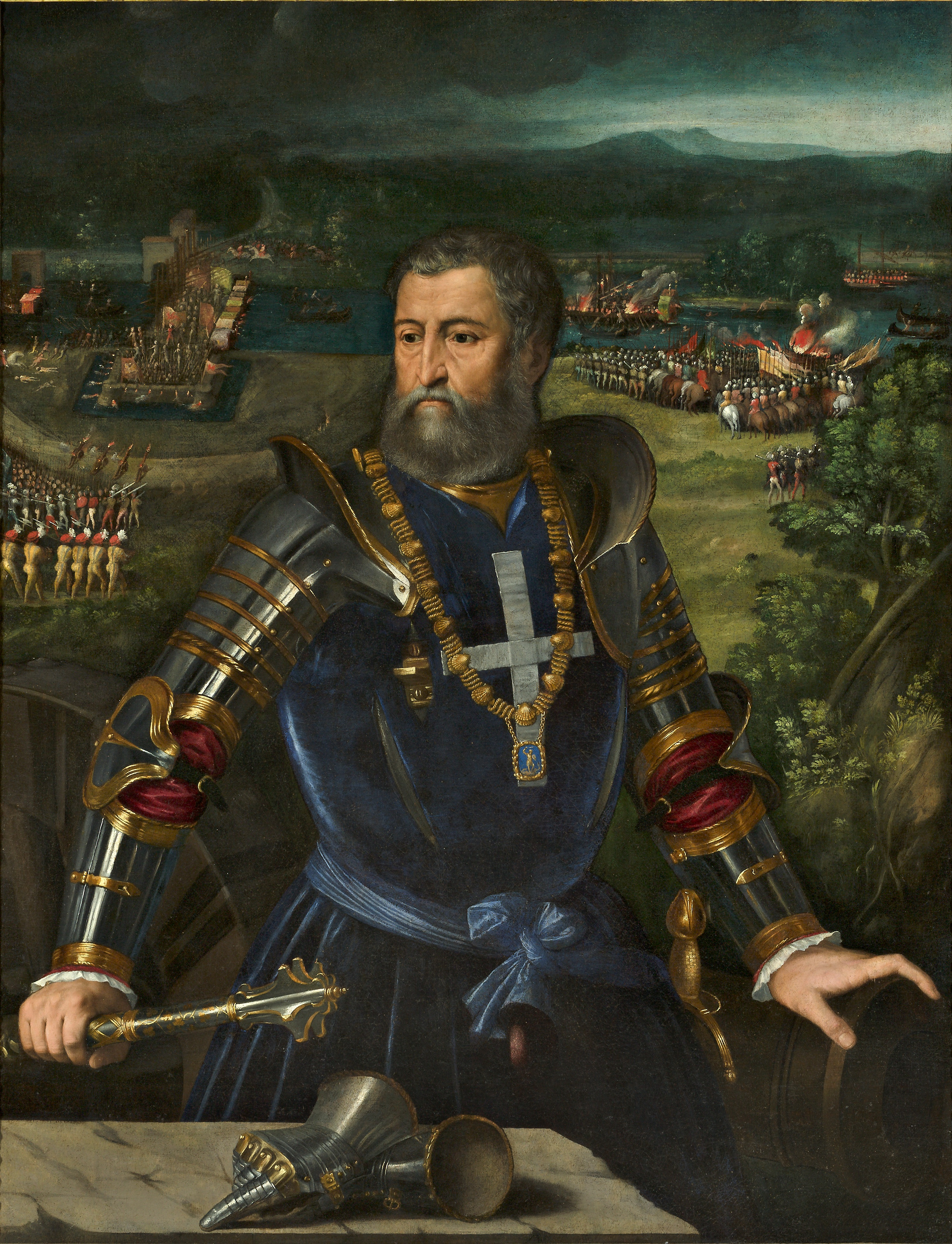
Portrait of Alfonso I d'Este. с. 1530, Galleria Estense, Modena

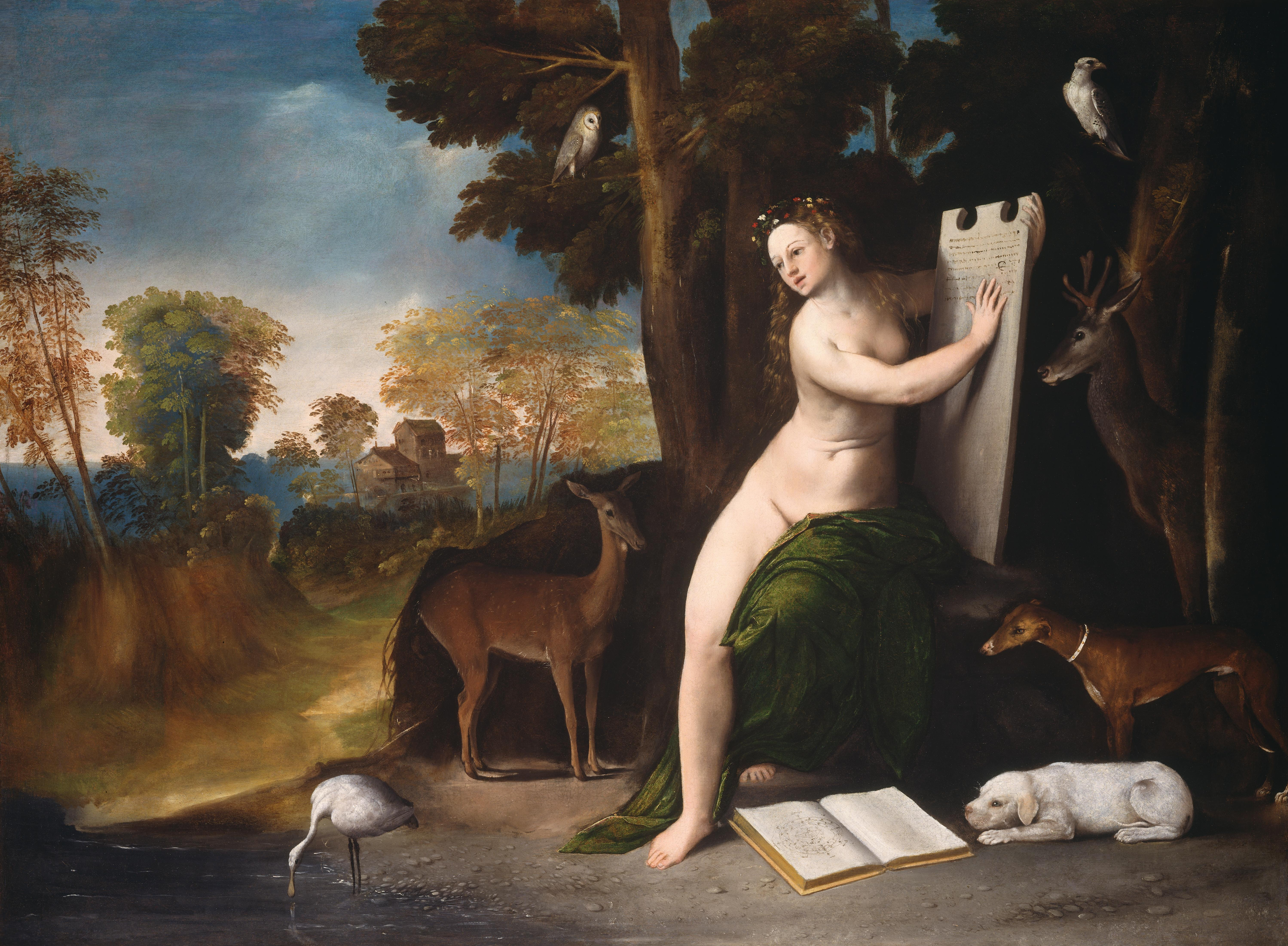
Circe and her Lovers in a Landscape, at the National Gallery of Art, Washington, D.C.

- Holy Family with Donors (1514, Philadelphia Museum of Art)
- Aeneas in the Elysian Fields, (1518–1521, National Gallery of Canada, Ottawa)
- The Virgin Appearing to Sts John the Baptist and John the Evangelist (1520s, Uffizi Gallery, Florence)
- Jupiter painting Butterflies, Mercury and the Virtue, (1524, Wawel Castle, Kraków)
- Mythological Scene, c.1524; oil on canvas, 164 × 145 cm, J. Paul Getty Museum, Los Angeles
- Allegory of Music, (1530s, Museo Horne, Florence)
- Allegory of Fortune, c.1530; oil on canvas, 178 × 216.5 cm, J. Paul Getty Museum, Los Angeles
- Portrait of a Woman, 1530–1535; oil on canvas, Musée Condé
- Virgin of the Assumption and St. Michael the Archangel, c.1533–34, Galleria nazionale di Parma
- Three Ages of Man or Rustic Idyll; 77.5 × 11.8 cm, Metropolitan Museum of Art
- Aeneas, Barber Institute, Birmingham
- Hercules and the Pygmies Alte Galerie of the Joanneum Graz
- Tubalcain (Allegory of Music) Museo Horne
- Witchraft Stregoneria (Choice of Hercules between Vice and Virtue) Galleria degli Uffizi
- Saint Michael (Staatliche Kunstsammlungen, Dresden)
- Saint George and the Dragon (Staatliche Kunstsammlungen, Dresden)
- Portrait of a Warrior, Uffizi Gallery, Florence
- Portrait of a Youth, portrait of Lucrezia Borgia, National Gallery of Victoria
- The stoning of Saint Stephen, Thyssen-Bornemisza Museum, Madrid, on loan to the MNAC Barcelona.
