= Hendrick Cornelisz. van Vliet =

Dutch Golden Age painter

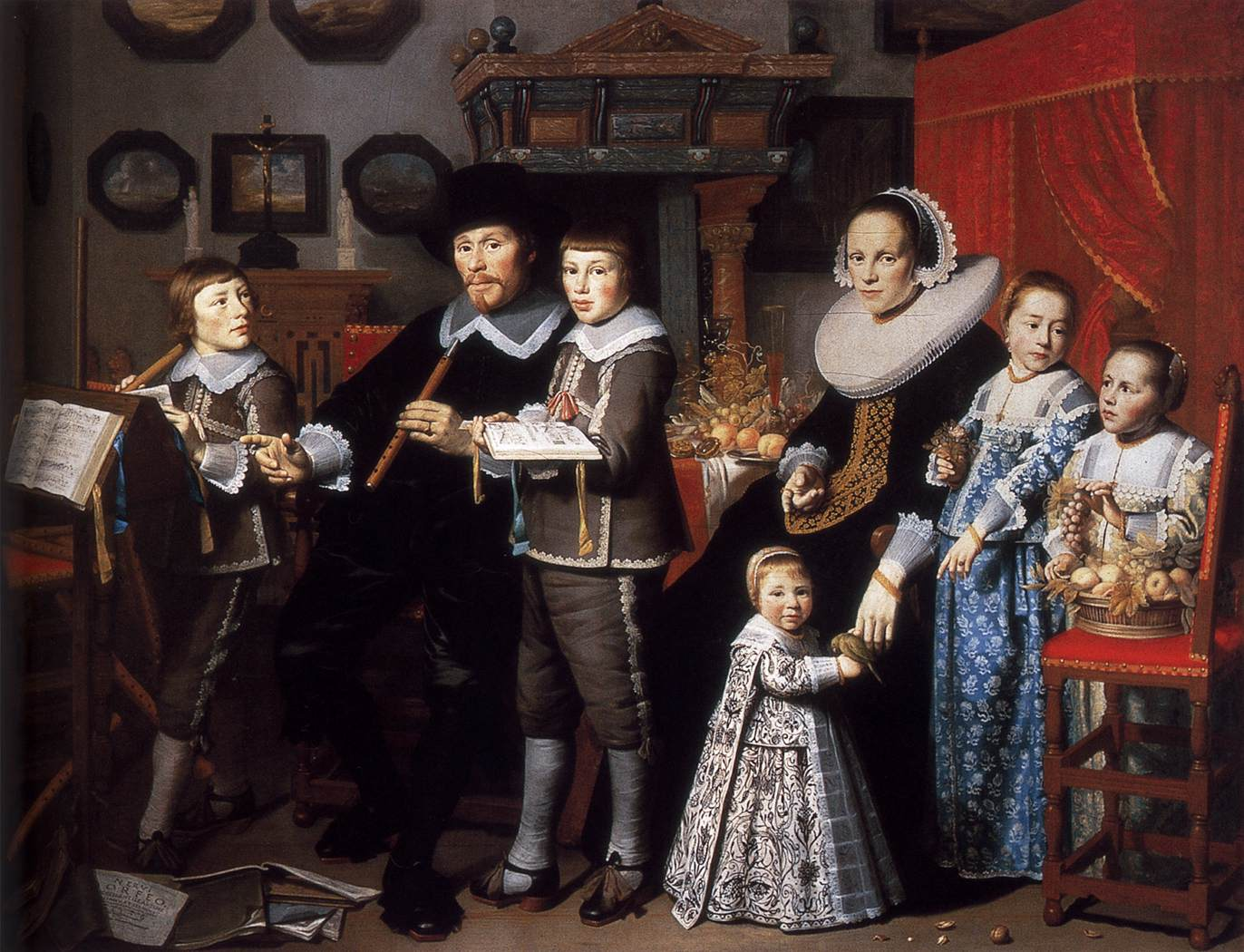
Portrait of Michiel van der Dussen, his Wife, Wilhelmina van Setten and their Children 1640 Gemeente Musea Delft; Collection Stedelijk Museum Het Prinsenhof, Delft

Hendrick Corneliszoon van Vliet (1611/1612, Delft – buried October 28, 1675, Delft) was a Dutch Golden Age painter remembered mostly for his church interiors.

== Biography ==
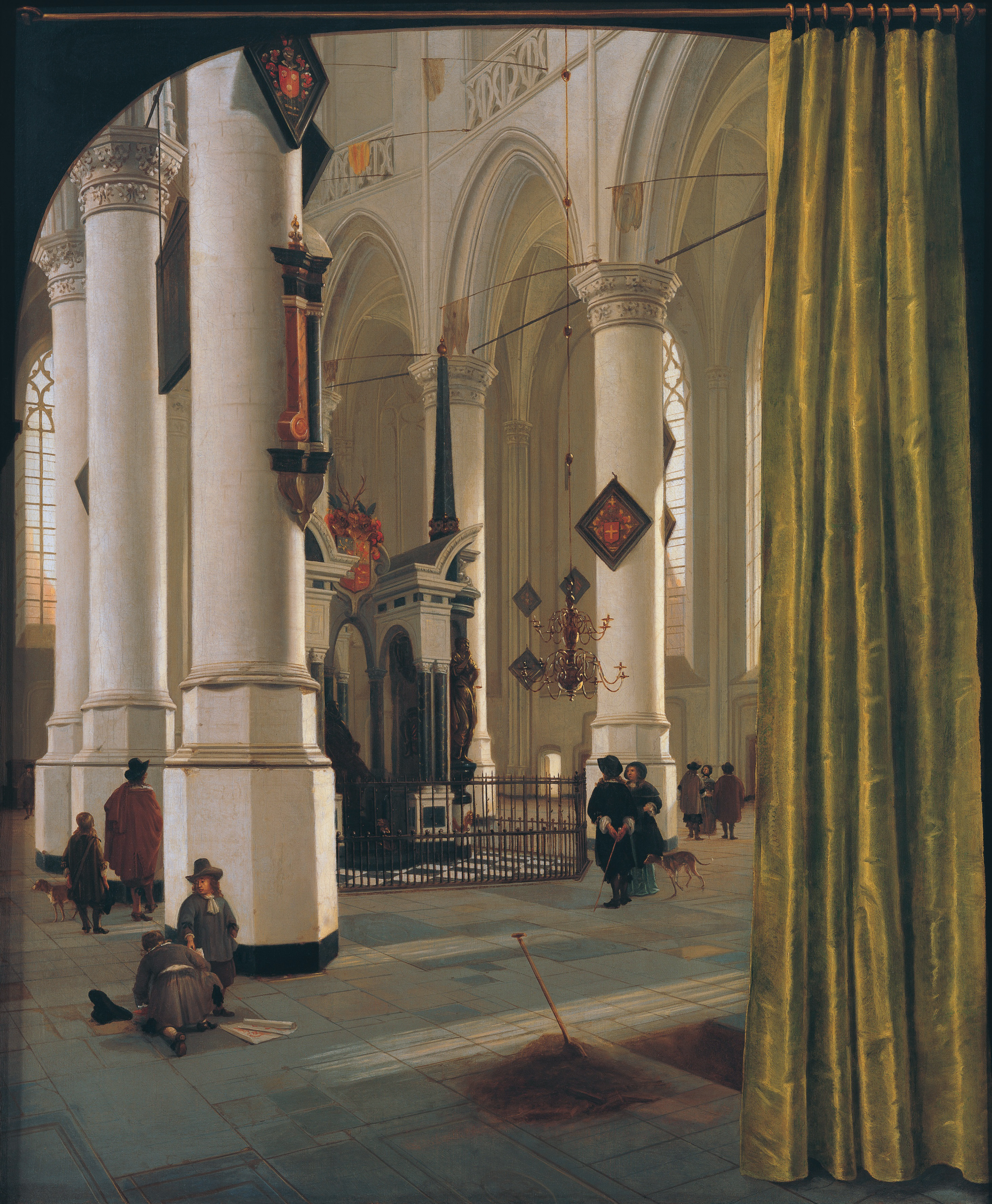
Nieuwe Kerk, Delft, c.1650 with tomb of William the Silent.

He studied under his uncle Willem van der Vliet and was admitted to the painters guild in Delft in 1632. He was good at perspective but later took up portrait painting with Michiel Jansz van Mierevelt. Van Vliet started out with architectural painting, particularly the painting of church interiors. Before him, architectural painting had been pioneered by Pieter Saenredam, who introduced innovative techniques of perspective. By mid century, architectural painting gained great popularity. Among the churches painted by Van Vliet are the Pieterskerk (Peter's Church) in Leiden, the Nieuwe Kerk (New Church) in Delft, and the Oude Kerk (Old Church) in Delft (Van Vliet would be buried in the latter in 1675). Emanuel de Witte and Gerard Houckgeest, also painted these Delft church interiors. Paintings of the tomb of William the Silent were quite popular.

== Works ==
The paintings of Van Vliet can be seen at the Rijksmuseum in Amsterdam, Centraal Museum Utrecht, the Metropolitan Museum of Art in New York, the Walker Art Gallery (Liverpool, England), the Milwaukee Art Museum, the Ringling Art Museum in Sarasota, Florida, the Nelson-Atkins Art Museum in Kansas City, Missouri, the Baltimore Museum of Art in Baltimore, the Bildenden Kunste Art Museum in Leipzig, Germany and the Hermitage Museum (Portrait of a Woman) and Pushkin Art Museum in Russia.

== Sources ==
- Hendrick van Vliet at the Netherlands Institute for Art History
