= Portrait of a Lady (Titian) =

Several works by or after Titian have been entitled Portrait of a Lady, including:

- La Schiavona, 1510–1512
- Portrait of a Lady (Titian, Chicago), c. 1525–1565
- Woman Holding an Apple, c. 1550
- Portrait of a Lady in White, c. 1561
