= Pieter Tjarck =

Painting by Frans Hals

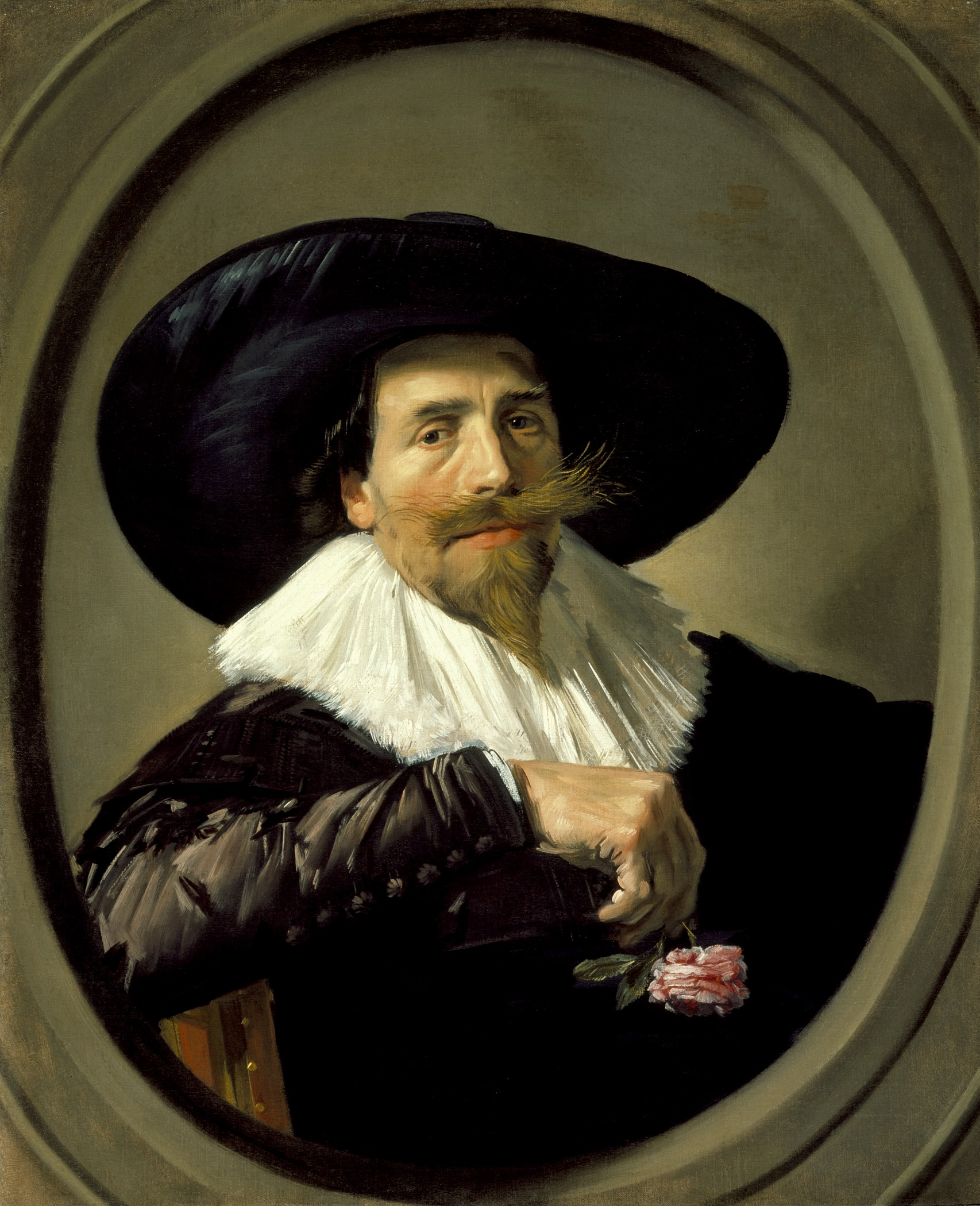
- Pieter Tjarck, c.1638. Oil on canvas, 85.3 x 69 cm
- Artist: Frans Hals
- Year: 1638
- Catalogue: Seymour Slive, Catalog 1974: #108
- Medium: Oil on canvas
- Dimensions: 85.3 cm × 69 cm (33.6 in × 27 in)
- Location: Los Angeles County Museum of Art, Gift of The Ahmanson Foundation; Los Angeles
- Accession: M.74.31
- Website: LACMA online

Pieter Tjarck is a portrait painting by the Dutch Golden Age painter Frans Hals, painted in 1638 and now in the Los Angeles County Museum of Art, Los Angeles.

== Painting ==
The painting shows a fashionably dressed gentleman leaning over the back of a chair holding a rose. This painting was documented by Ernst Wilhelm Moes in 1909 and Hofstede de Groot in 1910, who wrote:

PIETER TJARCK. M. 77. Half-length; in an oval of painted stone. A man seated, facing three-quarters right, looks at the spectator. His right arm rests on the arm of the chair; in the hand is a rose. He has a big moustache' and pointed beard. He is in black with a big broad hat and a soft close-fitting ruff. [Pendant to 232.] Canvas, 33 inches by 27 inches. See Moes, Iconographia Batava, No. 7993, i and 2. A copy is in the Liege Museum. Exhibited at Brussels, 1882, No. 86; in Paris, 1889; in the Royal Academy Winter Exhibition, London, 1891, No. 69; in the Portrait Exhibition at The Hague, 1903, No. 36. Sale. Comte d'Oultremont, Brussels, June 27, 1889 (Arnold and Tripp). In the possession of the Paris dealers Arnold and Tripp. In the collection of Sir Cuthbert Quilter, London.

Hofstede de Groot agreed with Moes on the identification of the pendant of this painting depicting Tjarck's wife Maria Larp, which today is in the collection of the National Gallery of London:

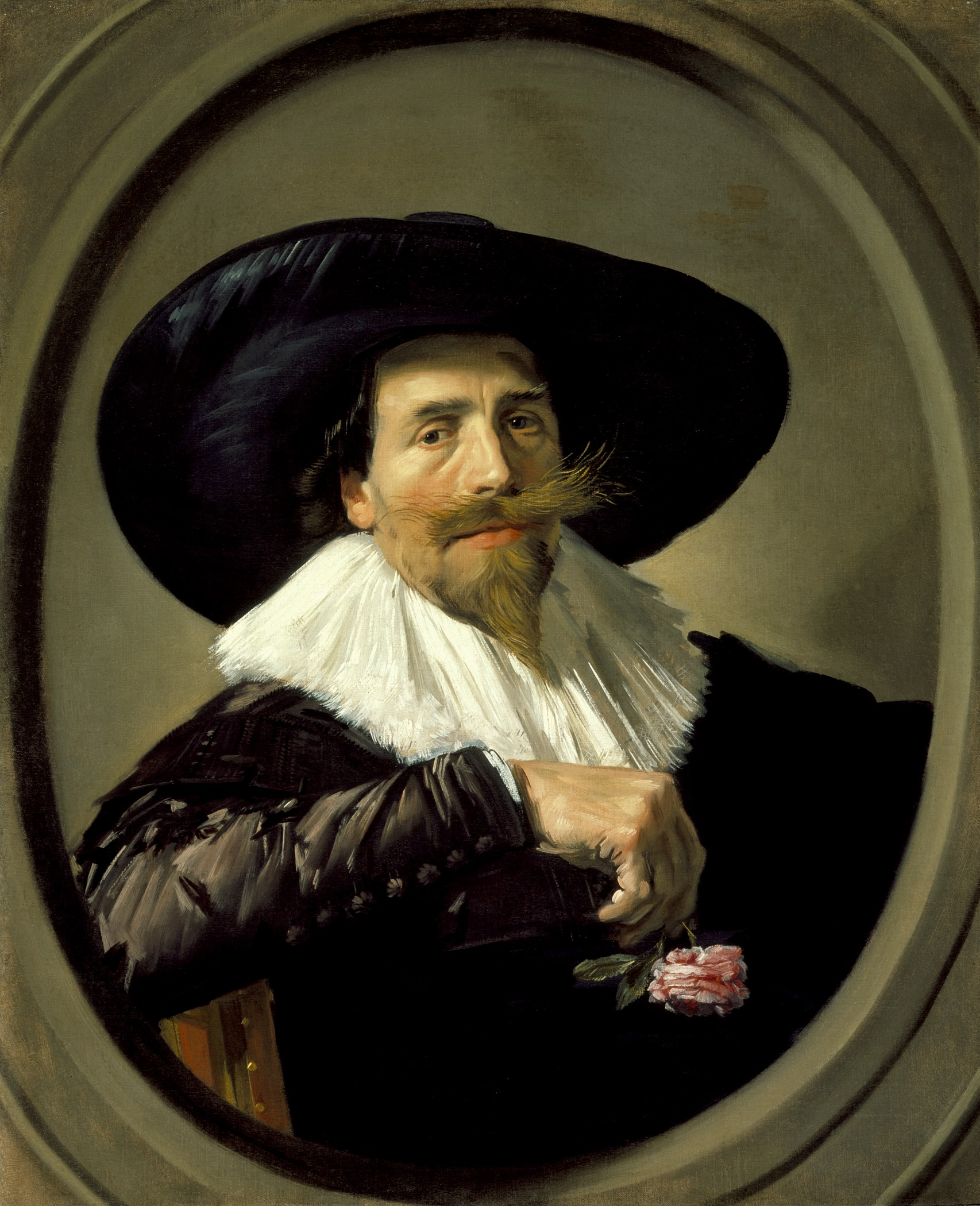

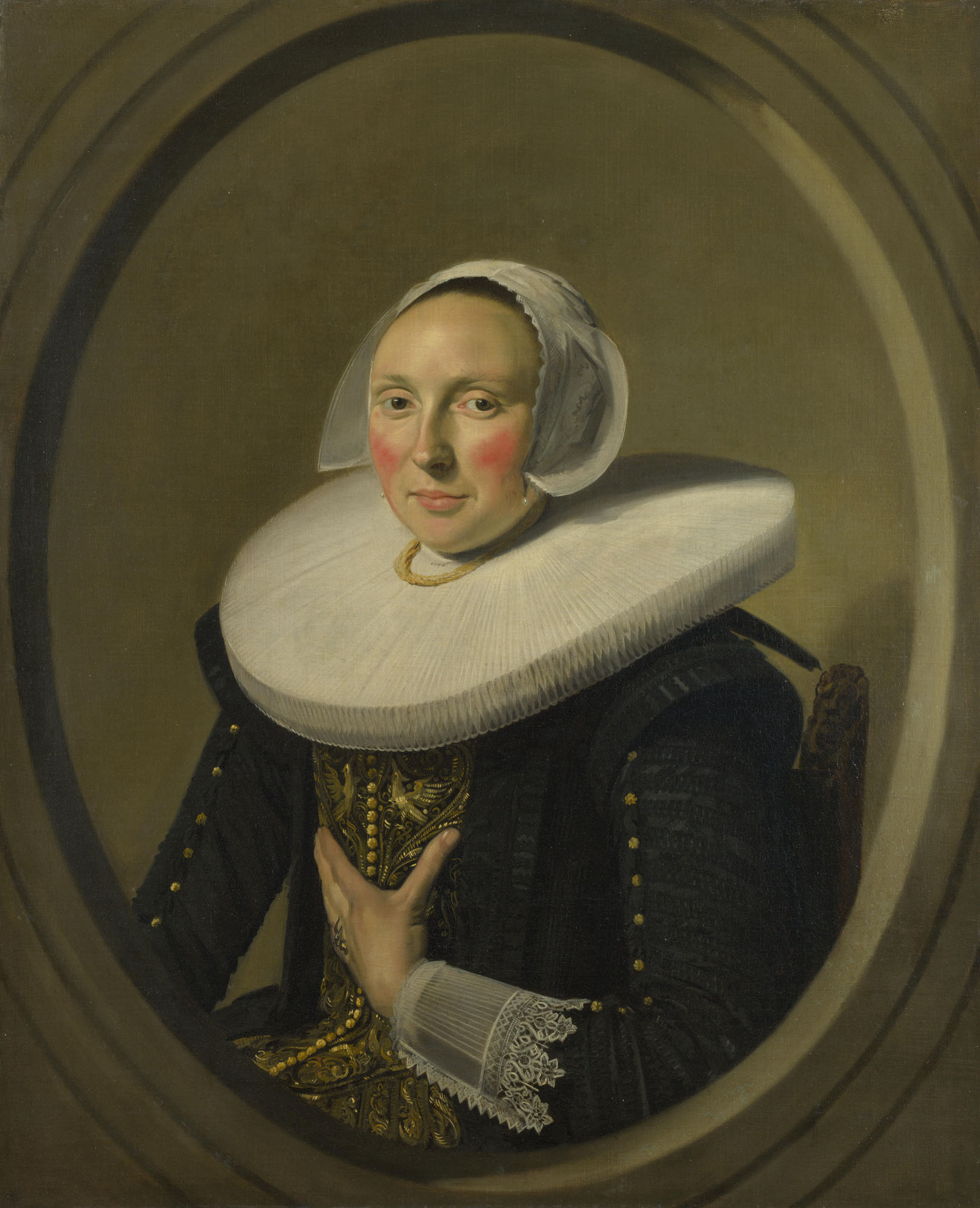

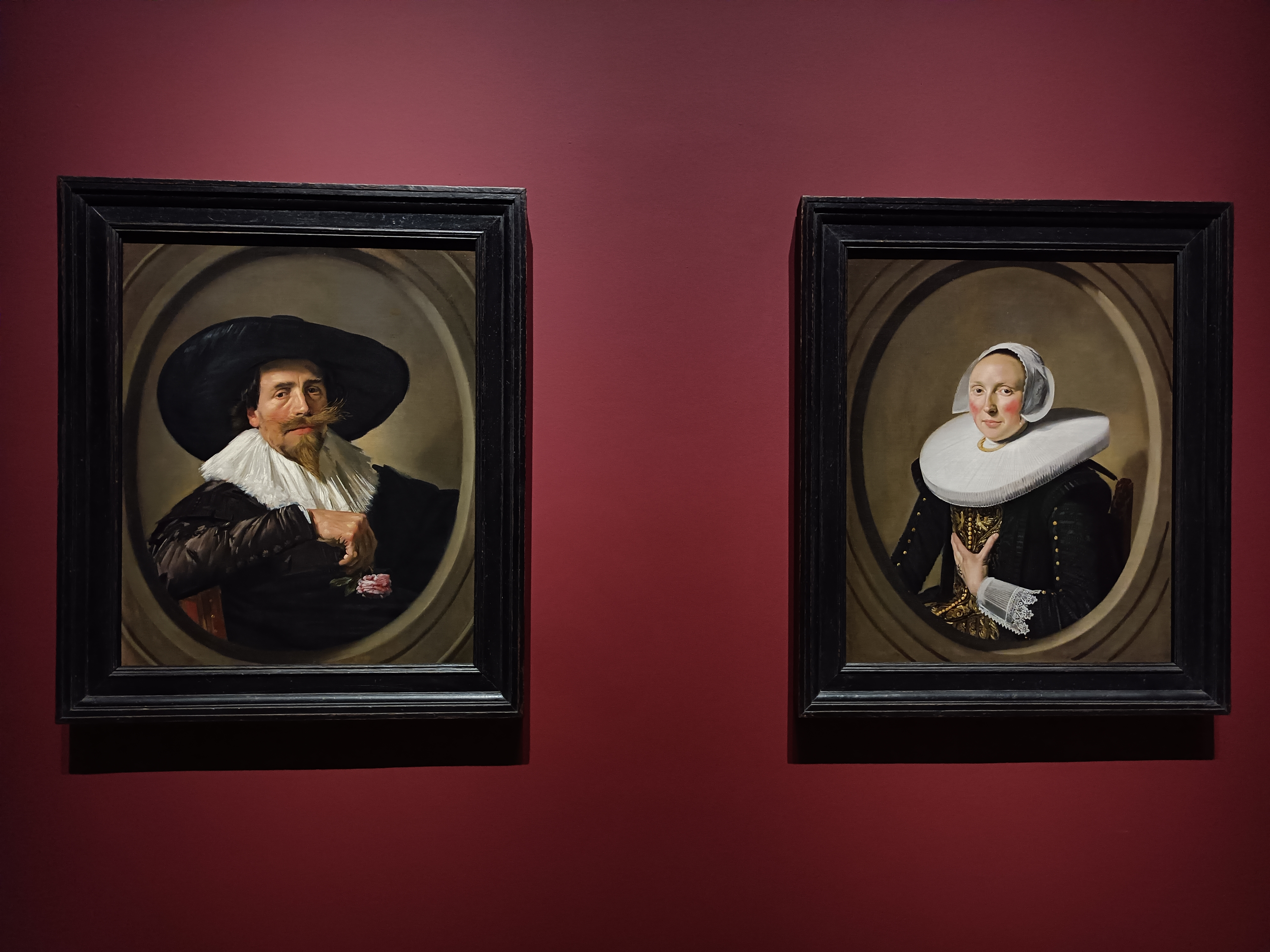
The two paintings hanging together at the Frans Hals exhibition at the National Gallery, London in 2023-24.

== See also ==
- List of paintings by Frans Hals
