= Portrait of a Woman (Sebastiano del Piombo) =

1512 painting by Sebastiano del Piombo

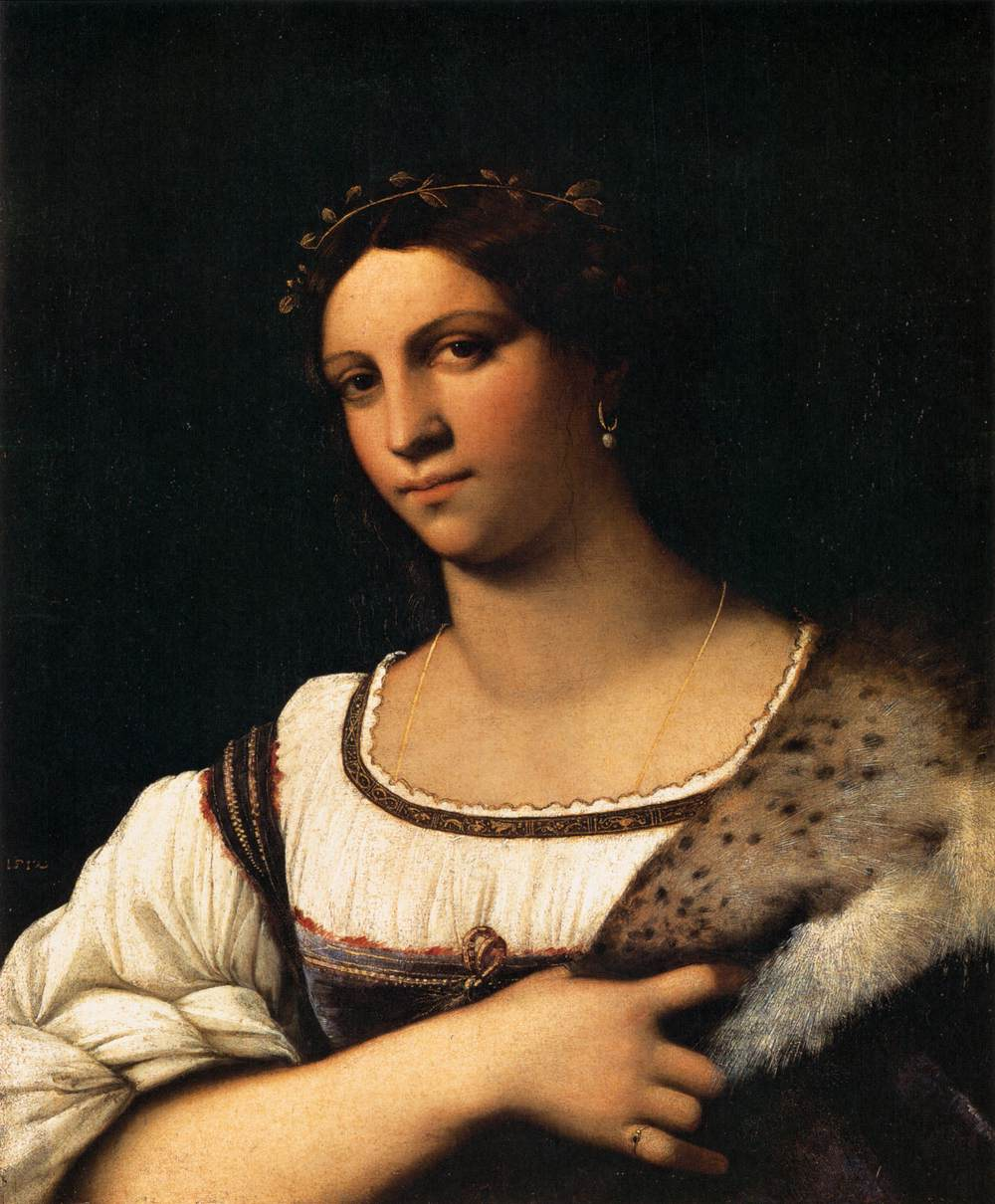
Portrait of a Woman (1512) by Sebastiano del Piombo

Portrait of a Woman is a 1512 oil painting on panel by the Italian painter Sebastiano del Piombo, dated by the artist and now in the Uffizi in Florence.

A 1589 inventory misattributed it to Raphael and another to Giorgione, with the latter misattribution lasting until 1784. The gallery's director Tommaso Puccini reverted to Raphael in 1793 and – exhibiting it in the Tribuna of the Uffizi – claimed it was Raphael's portrait of La Fornarina mentioned by Vasari.

Missirini argued its subject was Vittoria Colonna and reattributed its underdrawing to Michelangelo and painting to Sebastiano. Passavant and Garas continued to support the attribution to Raphael, but more recent studies such as those by Morelli, Berenson, Venturi and Lucco have conclusively attributed it to Sebastiano del Piombo. Lucco also mentions a possibly autograph copy of the painting in the Museo nazionale del Palazzo di Venezia in Rome.
