= Portrait of a Woman (Marie Larp) =

Painting by Frans Hals

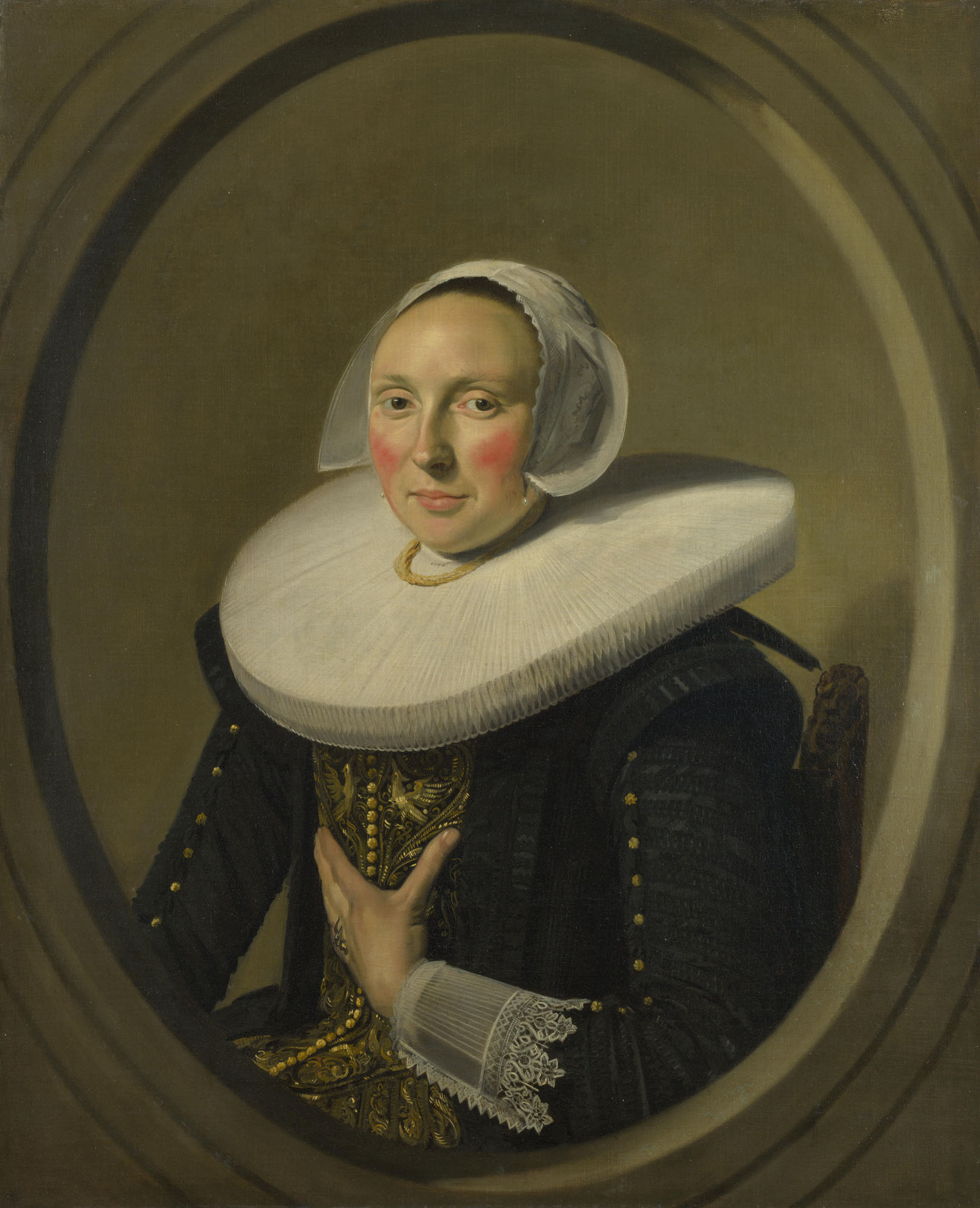
- Artist: Frans Hals
- Year: ca. 1635–1638
- Medium: Oil on canvas
- Dimensions: 83.4 cm × 68.1 cm (32.8 in × 26.8 in)
- Location: National Gallery; London, England

Portrait of a Woman (Marie Larp) is an oil-on-canvas portrait painting by the Dutch Golden Age painter Frans Hals, painted ca.1635–1638 and now at the National Gallery in London.

== Painting ==
The painting shows a fashionably dressed woman seated in a chair and holding her bridal stomacher with her left hand. This painting was documented by Ernst Wilhelm Moes in 1909 and Hofstede de Groot in 1910, who wrote:

232. MARIA LARP (buried November 15, 1675), wife of Pieter Tjarck. M. 78. Half-length, in a painted oval. She faces three- quarters left and looks at the spectator. Her left hand is at her bosom; the right hand is not shown. She wears a white cap, a ruff, a black dress embroidered with white at the bosom, and lace wristbands. The colour of the face is very life-like. [Pendant to 231.] Panel, 30 inches by 27 inches. See Moes, Iconographia Batava, No. 4378. Exhibited at Brussels, 1882. Sale. Comte d'Oultremont, Brussels, June 27, 1889 (Arnold and Tripp). In the possession of the Paris dealers Arnold and Tripp. In the collection of W. C. Alexander, London.

This portrait has a pendant painting, depicting her husband Pieter Tjarck, which today is in the collection of the Los Angeles County Museum of Art at Los Angeles:

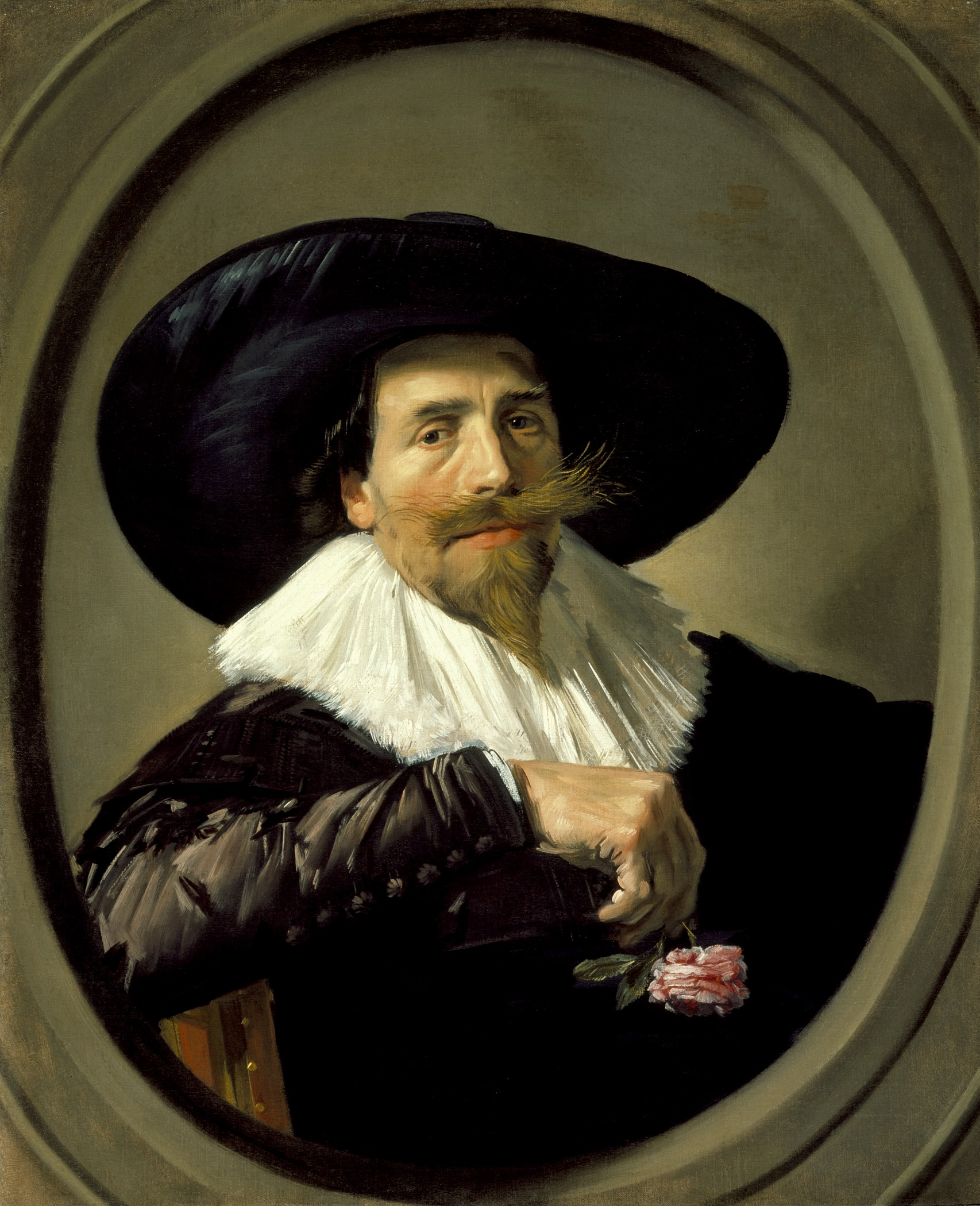

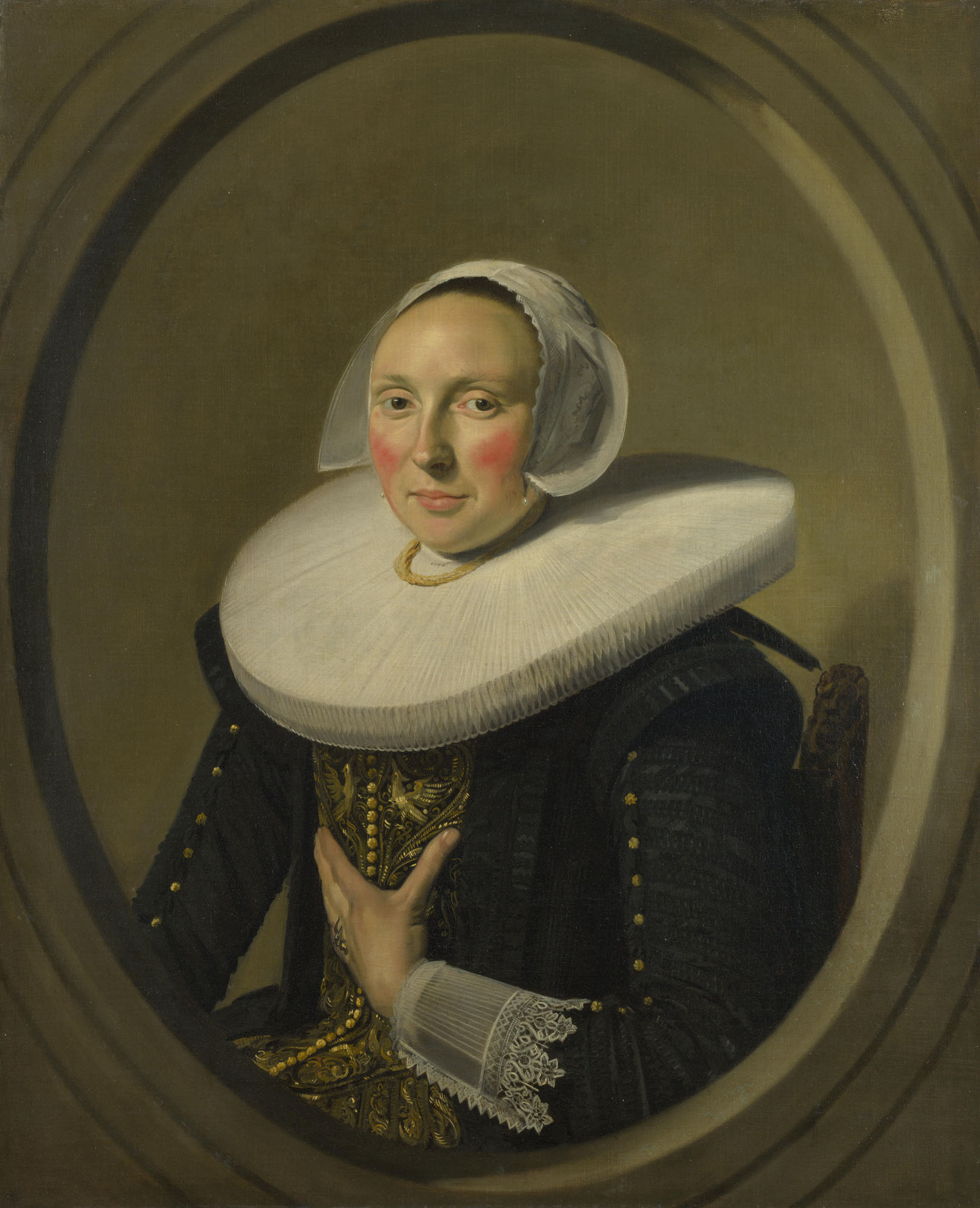

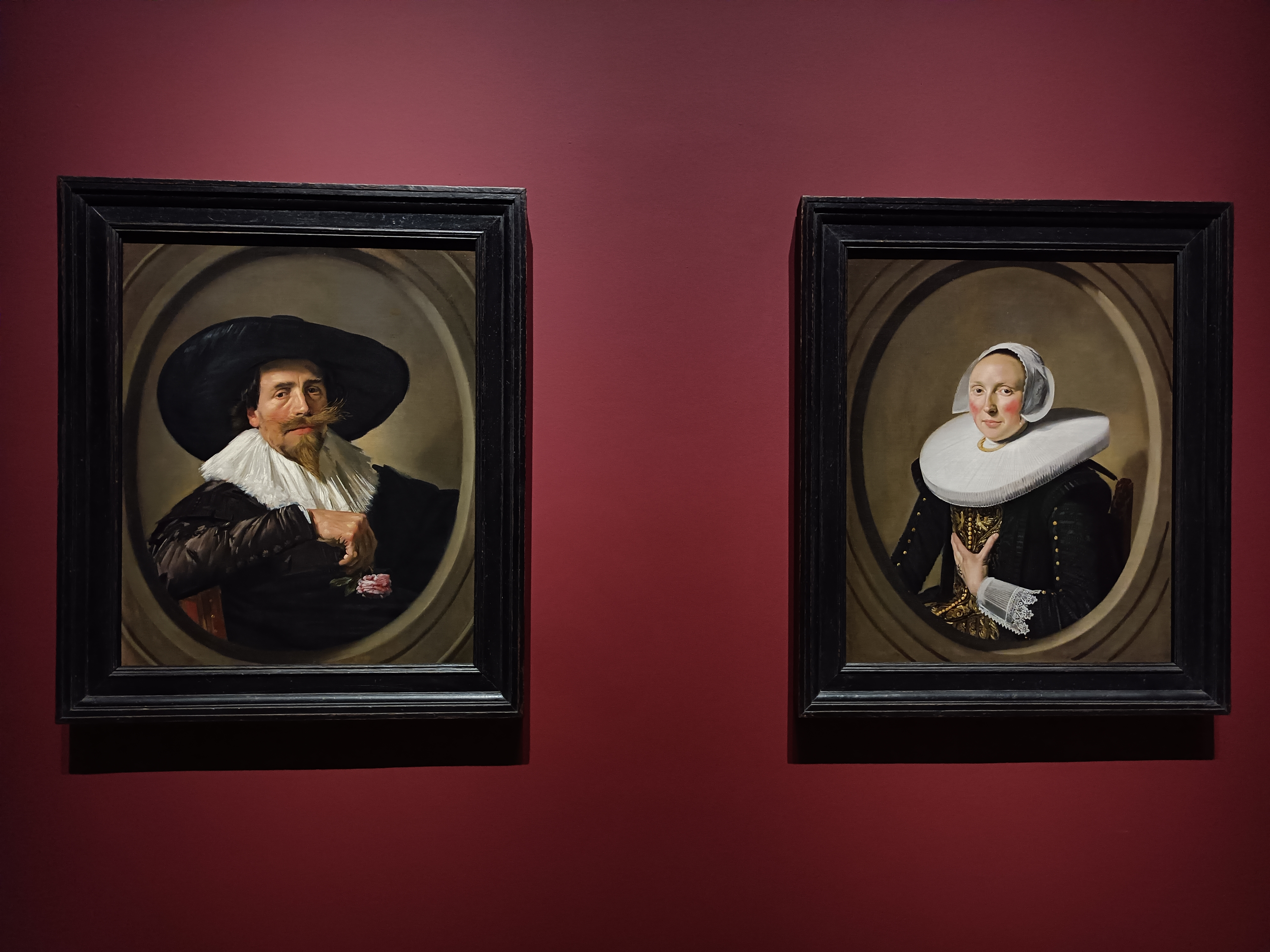
The two paintings hanging together at the Frans Hals exhibition at the National Gallery, London in 2023-24.

== See also ==
- List of paintings by Frans Hals
- Pieter Tjarck
