= Portrait of a Woman (Dosso Dossi) =

Painting by Dosso Dossi

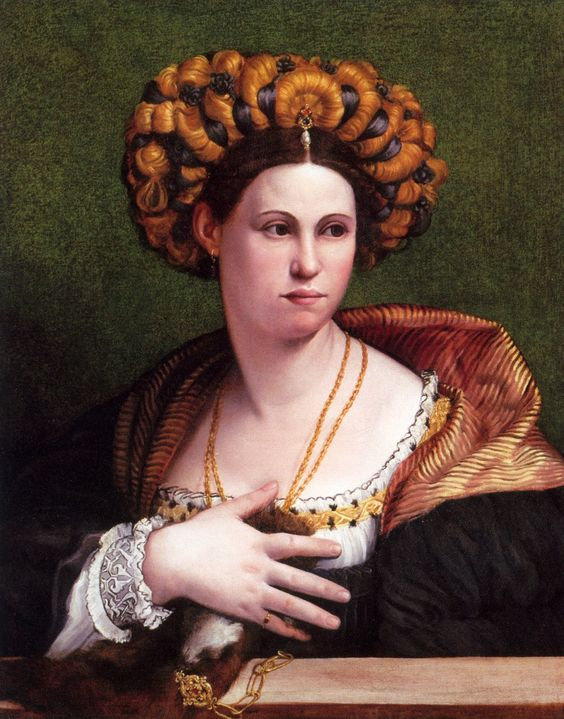
Portrait of a Woman (c. 1530–1535) attributed to Dosso Dossi

Portrait of a Woman is an oil-on-canvas portrait of an unknown woman, now attributed to the Italian artist Dosso Dossi, painted ca. 1530–1535. It is now in the Musée Condé.

It is first definitively recorded in the inventory of the collections of the Palazzo della Pilotta in Parma in 1708, meaning it originated in the Farnese collection, which had been in the Palazzo del Giardino in Parma since at least 1680. It was probably acquired by the Farnese family as a result of confiscations early in the 17th century. The whole Farnese collection was sent to Naples in 1734 after Charles of Bourbon's accession as king of Naples. He had inherited it from his mother Elisabeth Farnese, wife of Philip V of Spain. The work was inherited by Leopold, Prince of Salerno, son of Ferdinand I of the Two Sicilies. In 1854 Leopold's collection was sold in its entirety to his nephew Henri d'Orleans, Duke of Aumale, then in exile in Britain - Portrait was then still attributed to Giulio Romano. He brought it to France in 1871 and hung it in his château de Chantilly.

The current attribution was first mooted in 1932 by Bernard Berenson, though Felton Gibbons's monograph on the painter preferred to see it as a studio copy after a lost autograph original - Gibbons also argued it was a pendant to Portrait of a Man (Fitzwilliam Museum). Portrait of a Woman was restored in 1984, showing much retouching, restoring the original colours and confirming it as an autograph Dossi work. The very linear eye is characteristic of the painter and can also be seen in his Portrait of a Man with Five Rings (Royal Collection, Hampton Court) and Portrait of a Soldier (Fogg Art Museum). The treatment of costume details is also reminiscent of the women in Dossi's Allegory of Hercules (Uffizi) and Portrait of a Man (Louvre).
