= Portrait of a Woman (van Vliet) =

Painting by Vliet, Hendrik Cornelisz. van der. 1611/12-1675

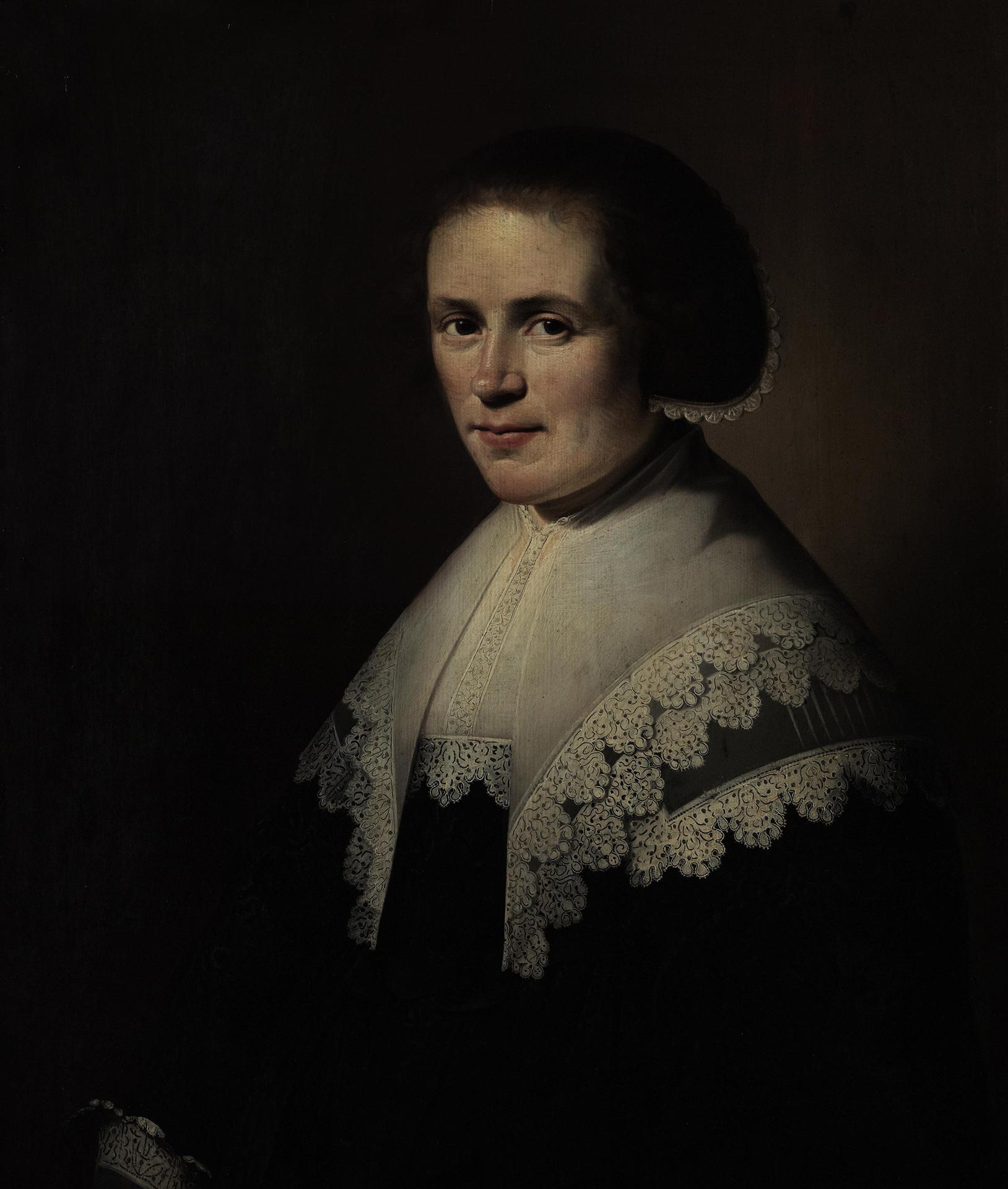
Portrait of a Woman (1641) by Hendrick Cornelisz. van Vliet

Portrait of a Woman is a 1641 oil on panel painting by the Dutch artist Hendrick Cornelisz. van Vliet, now in Room 249 of the Hermitage Museum, in Saint Petersburg.

Its subject is unknown, but a signature, date and inscription at bottom left shows she was thirty years old at the time - this is corroborated by her costume, which was in fashion in the 1640s. I. A. Sokolova, curator of Dutch paintings in the Hermitage, notes that “in the modeling of the face, monochrome parallel strokes in form are clearly visible, which have emerged as a result of the thinned upper paint layer”.

== Bibliography (in Russian) ==
- Кузнецов Ю. И. Голландская живопись XVII—XVIII в Эрмитаже: Очерк-путеводитель. — Л.: Искусство, 1988. — 232 с.
- Асварищ Б. И. Картинная галерея А. М. Горчакова. Каталог выставки к 200-летию со дня рождения светлейшего князя, государственного канцлера Александра Михайловича Горчакова 1798—1883 / Государственный Эрмитаж. — СПб.: Докар, 1998. — 94 с. — ISBN 5-85952-087-5.
- Государственный Эрмитаж. Музейные распродажи 1928—1929 годов: Архивные документы / Сост. Е. Ю. Соломаха. — СПб.: Изд-во Государственного Эрмитажа, 2006. — 532 с. — ISBN 5-93572-115-5.
- Соколова И. А. Государственный Эрмитаж. Голландская живопись XVII—XVIII веков: Каталог коллекции. — СПб.: Изд-во Государственного Эрмитажа, 2017. — Т. 2: Винкбонс — Люст. — 384 с. — ISBN 978-5-93572-746-8.
