= Portrait of a Lady in White =

Painting by Titian

- Artist: Titian
- Year: c. 1561
- Medium: Oil on canvas
- Location: Gemäldegalerie Alte Meister; Dresden

Portrait of a Lady in White is a painting by Titian, made about 1561, of an unknown gentlewoman dressed in white. It is now in the Gemäldegalerie Alte Meister, in Dresden.

== Identity of the sitter ==
Speculation about the sitter has ranged from a young bride to a prostitute or some family member of the artist. Detailed analysis of her jewelry, dress and hairstyle may give more clues, as does the fan she is carrying. It has long been assumed that Titian had depicted his daughter Lavinia in her bridal gown. However, she married six years before this painting was created, and his fourth child and other daughter, Emilia, didn't marry for another seven years. Titian probably created an ideal image of feminine beauty and used a model that he also used in other paintings. The painting was copied by Peter Paul Rubens, and a similar painting is also in the collection at Dresden.

== Exhibitions ==
The painting was lent to the Columbus Museum of Art in 2018, and to the Norton Simon Museum in 2019.

== Copies ==
Copy by Rubens, c. 1614

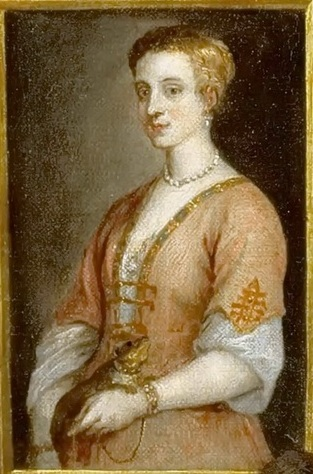
Miniature after a lost Titian

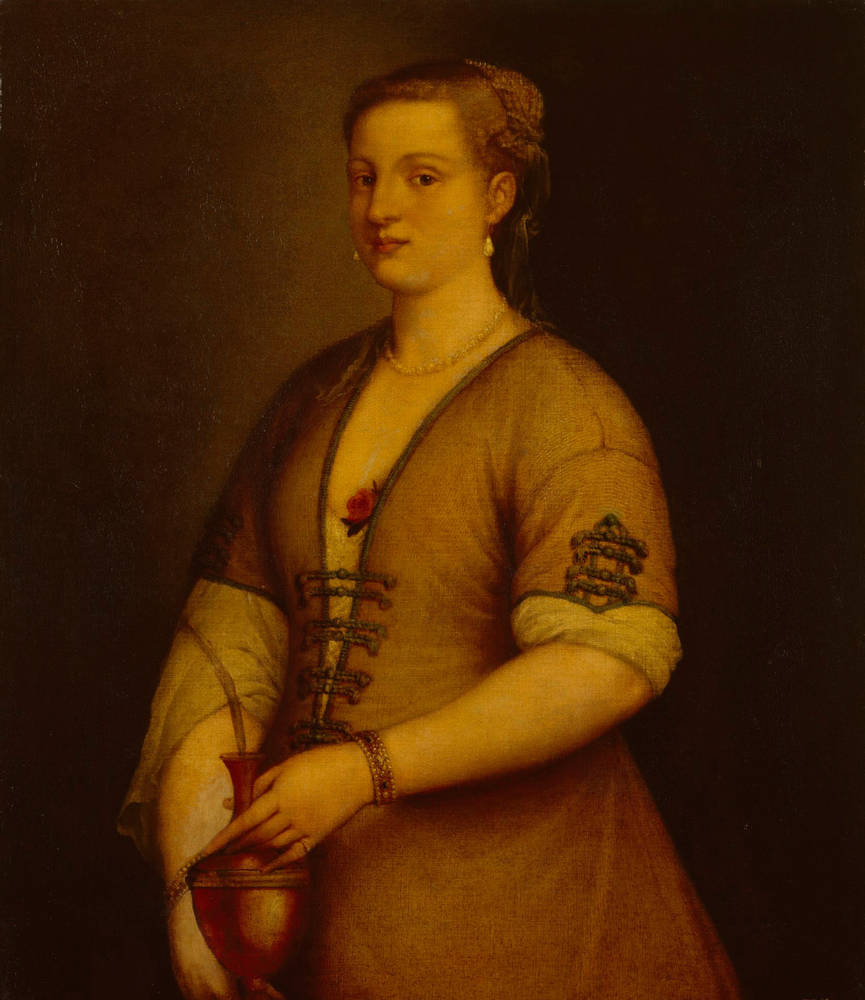
Copy of a lost Titian, c. 1650

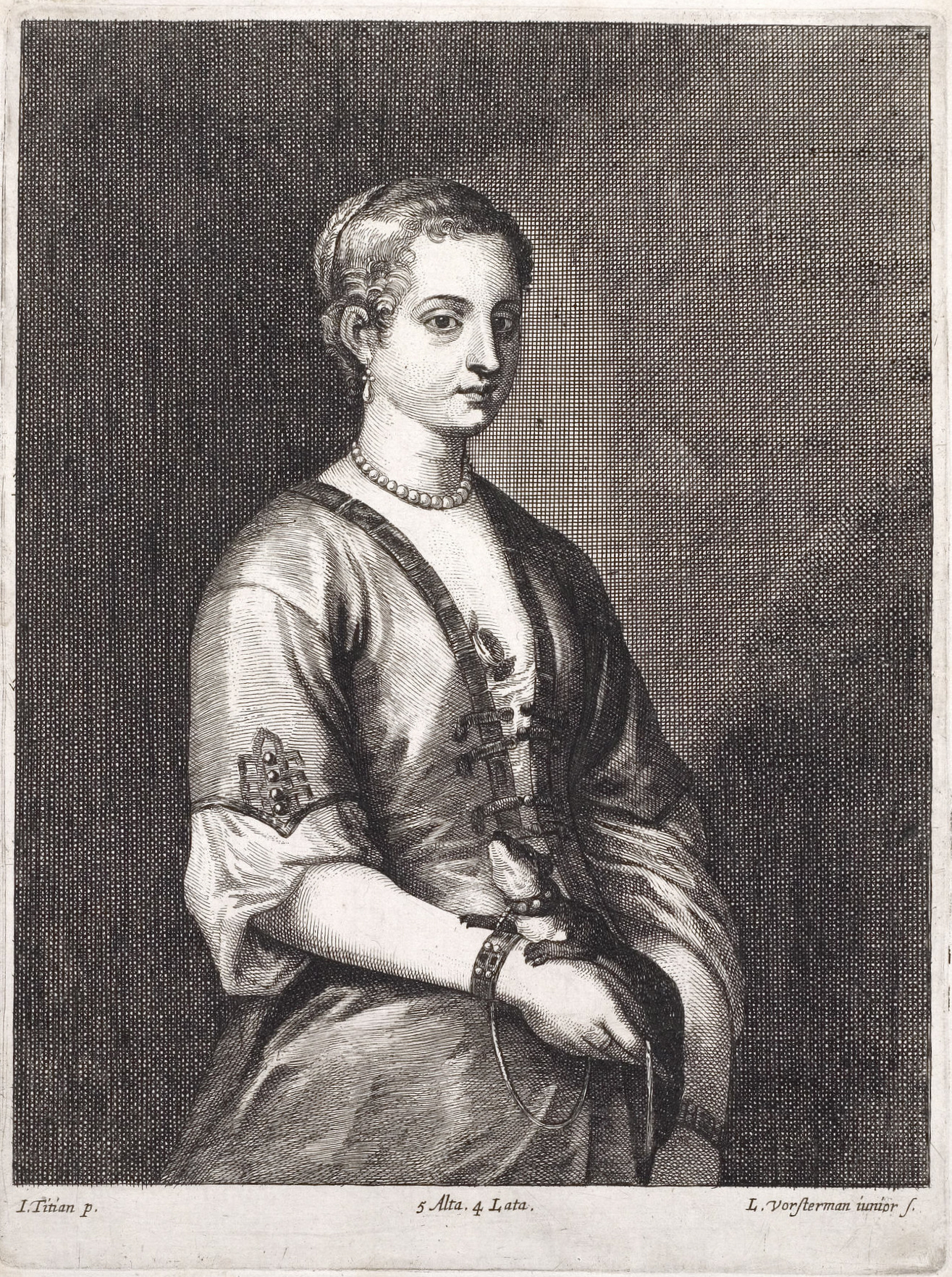
Engraving of a lost Titian, 1660

== Related portraits ==
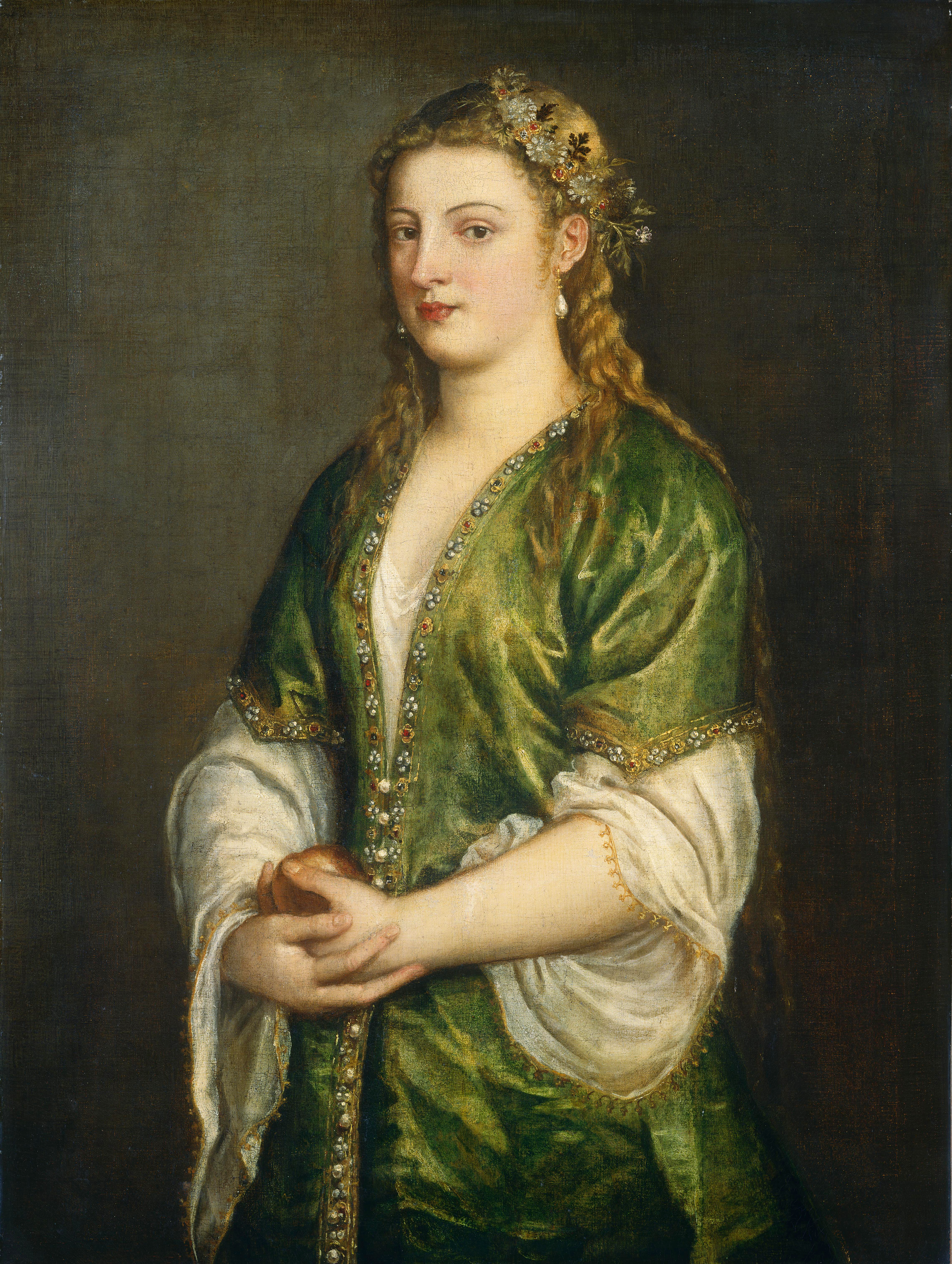
Portrait of a Lady, c. 1555

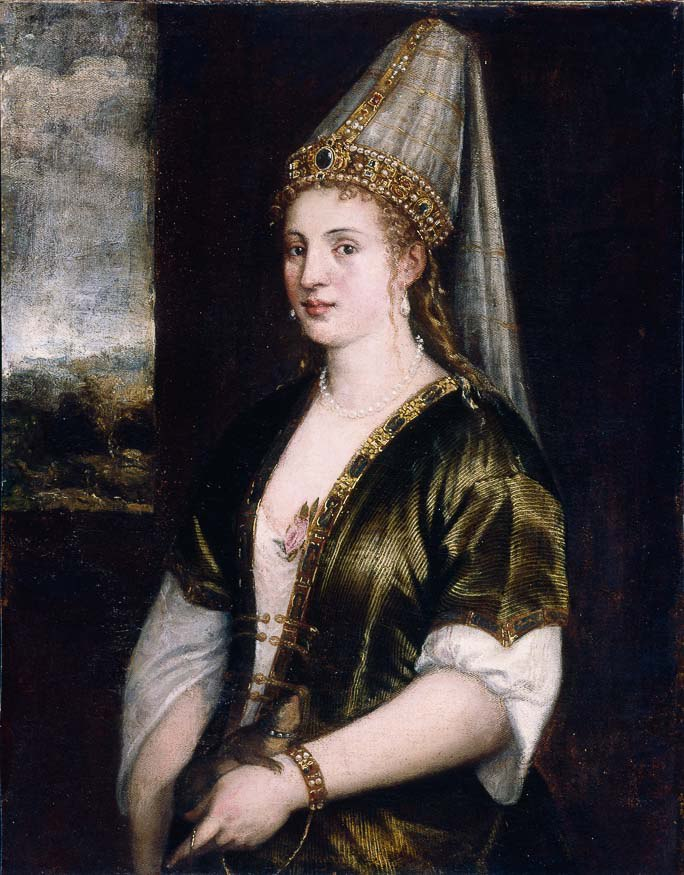
Portrait of Hurrem Sultan, c. 1550

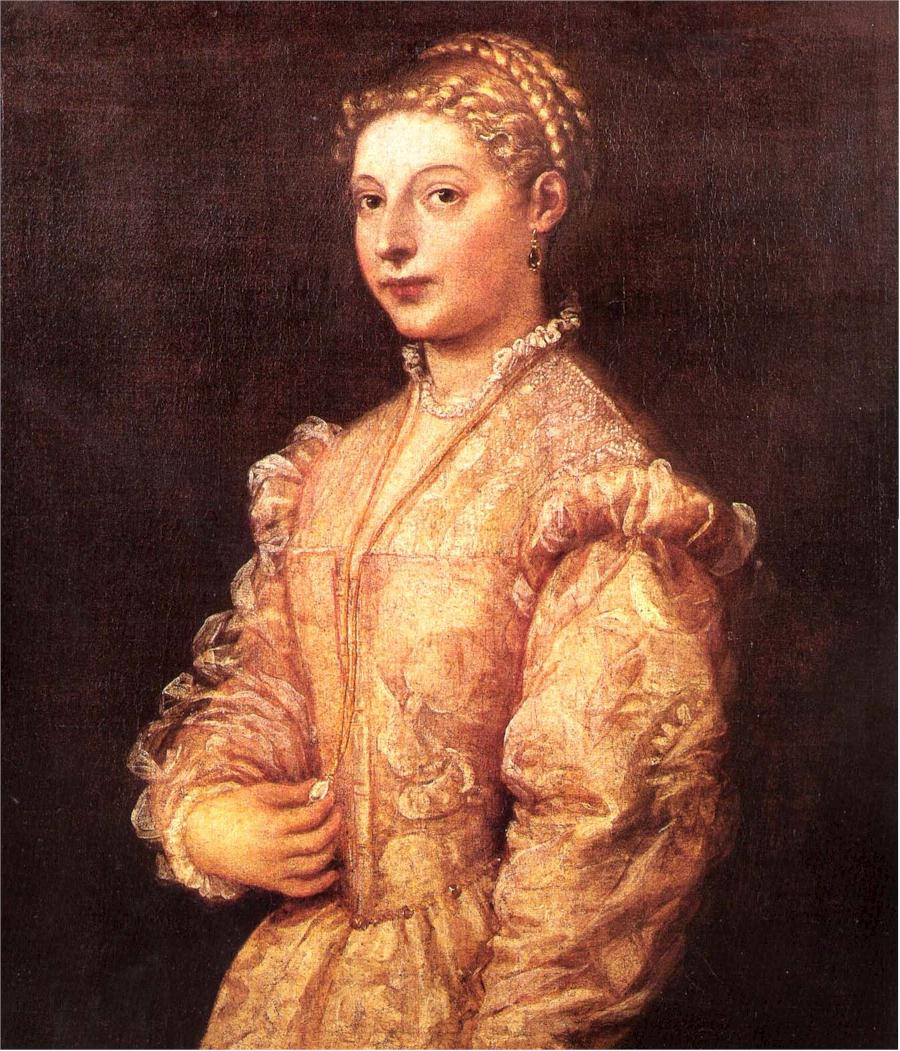
Portrait of Lavinia, 1545

Portrait of Lavinia, 1560–1565
