= Battista Dossi =

Italian painter

Battista Dossi (ca. 1490–1548), also known as Battista de Luteri, was an Italian painter who belonged to the Ferrara School of Painting. He spent nearly his entire career in service of the Court of Ferrara, where he worked with his older brother Dosso Dossi (c. 1489–1542). It is believed that Battista worked in the Rome studio of Raphael from 1517 to 1520. Battista's students include Camillo Filippi (c. 1500–1574).

== Gallery ==
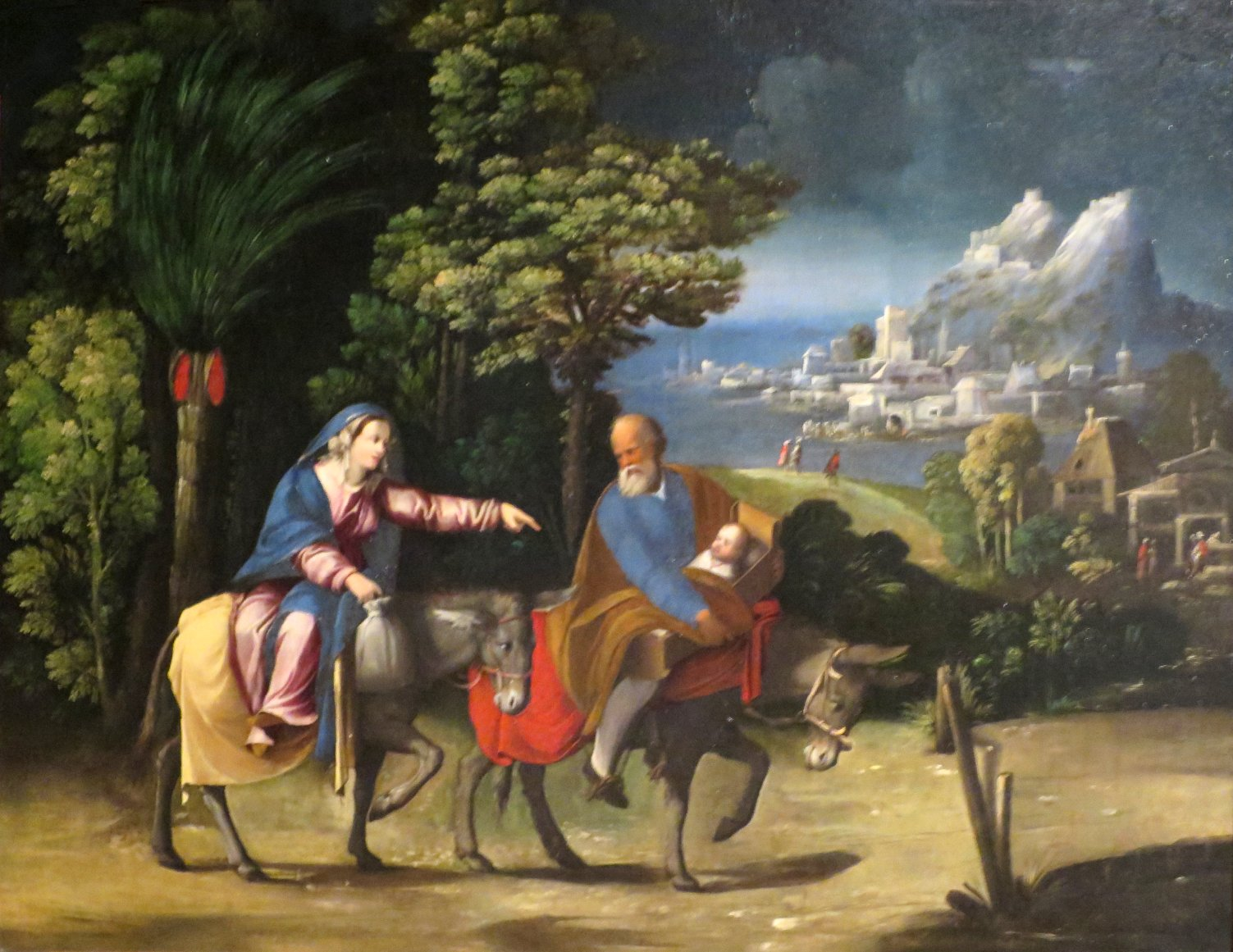
The Flight into Egypt

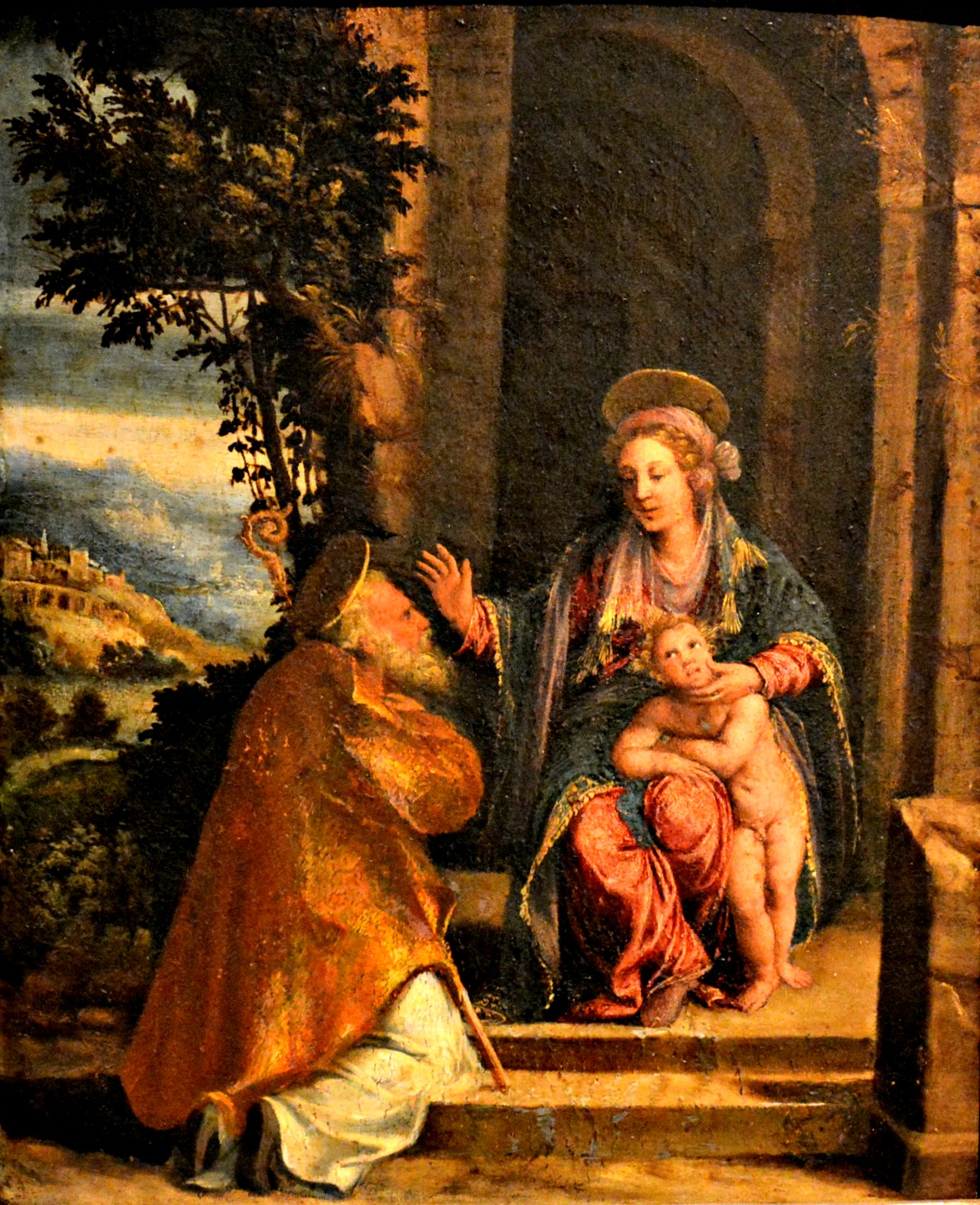
Madonna and Child with Holy Bishop

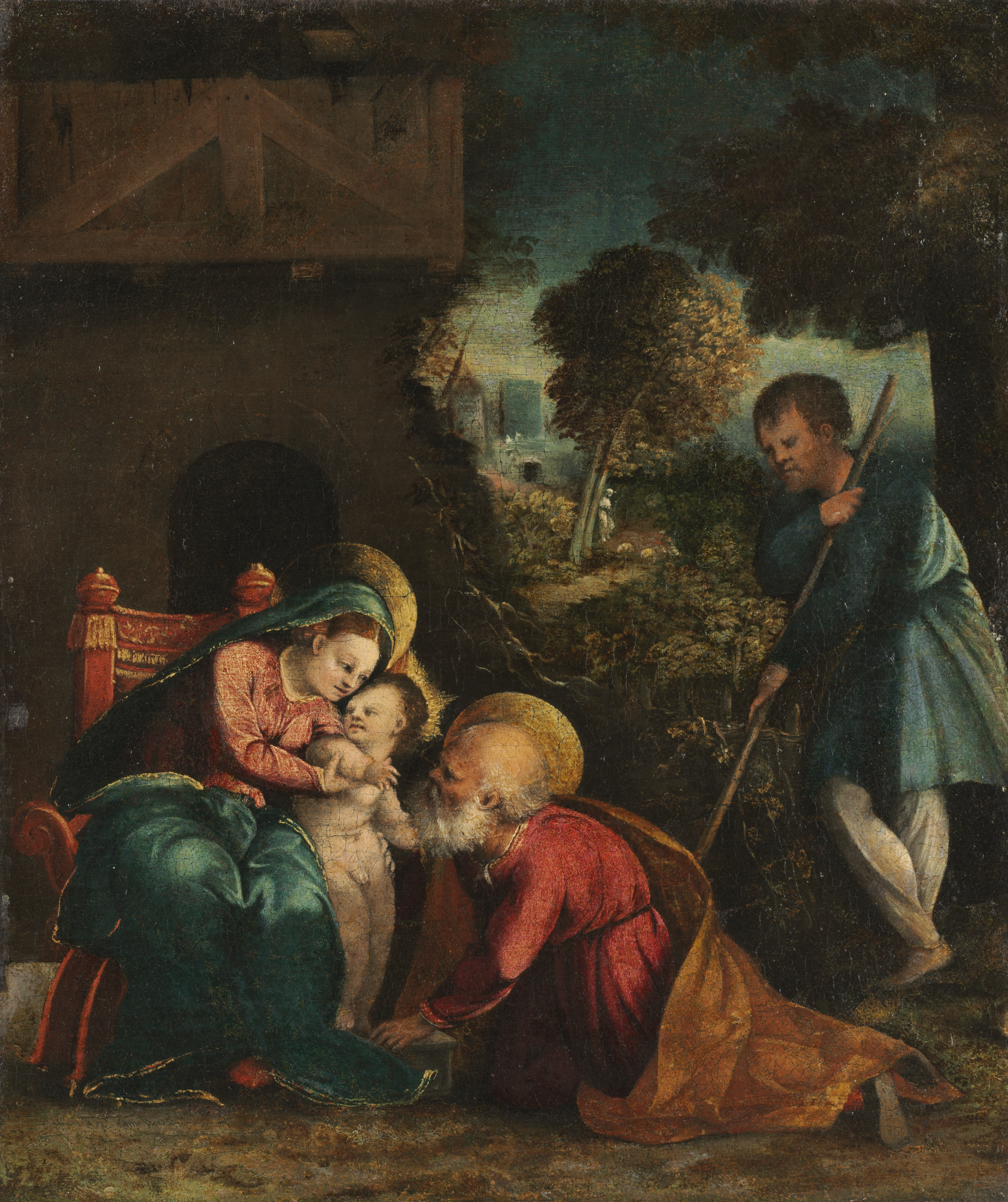
Holy Family with a Shepherd

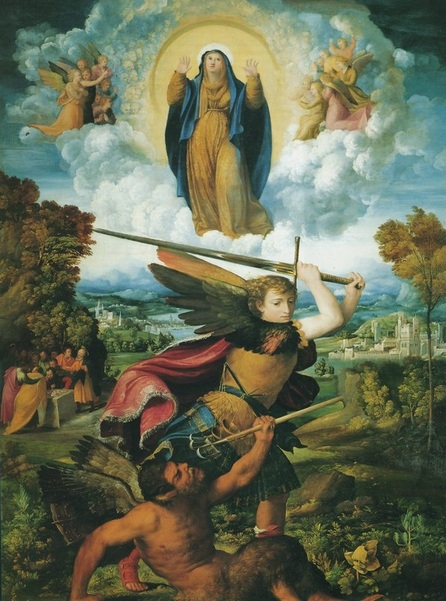
Virgin of the Assumption and St. Michael the Archangel, 1533

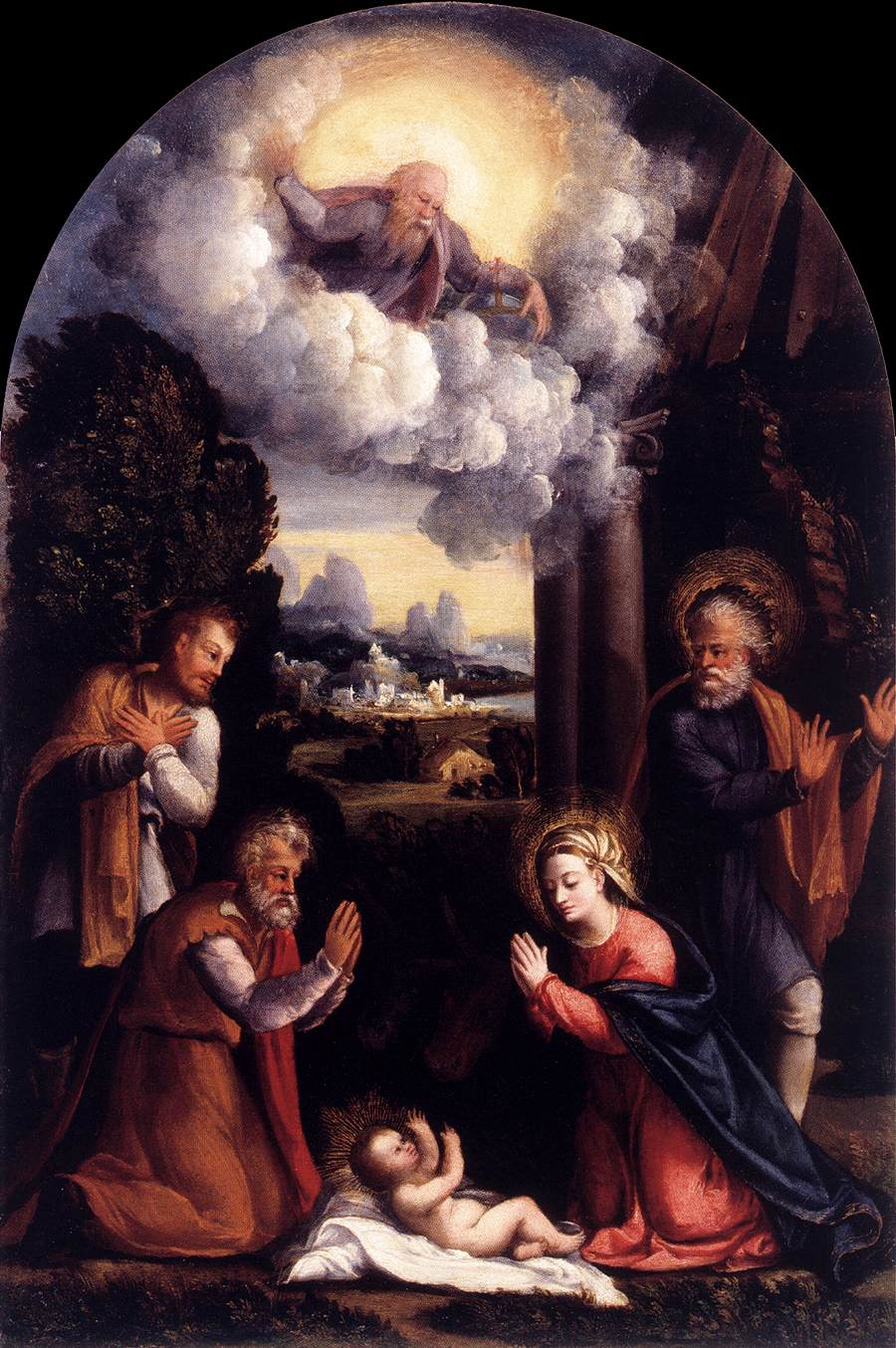
Nativity, circa 1520

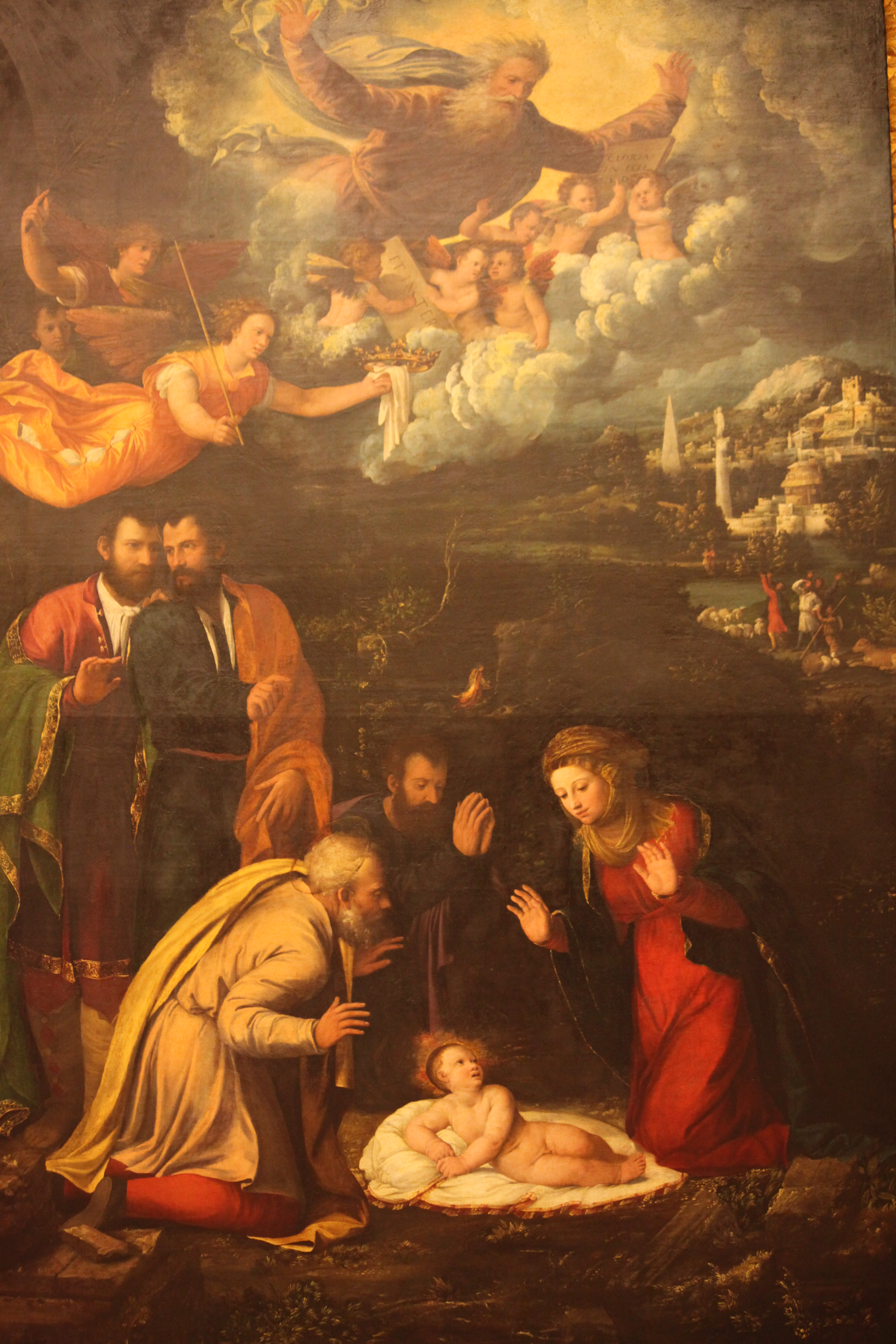
Adoration of the Child, 1533–36

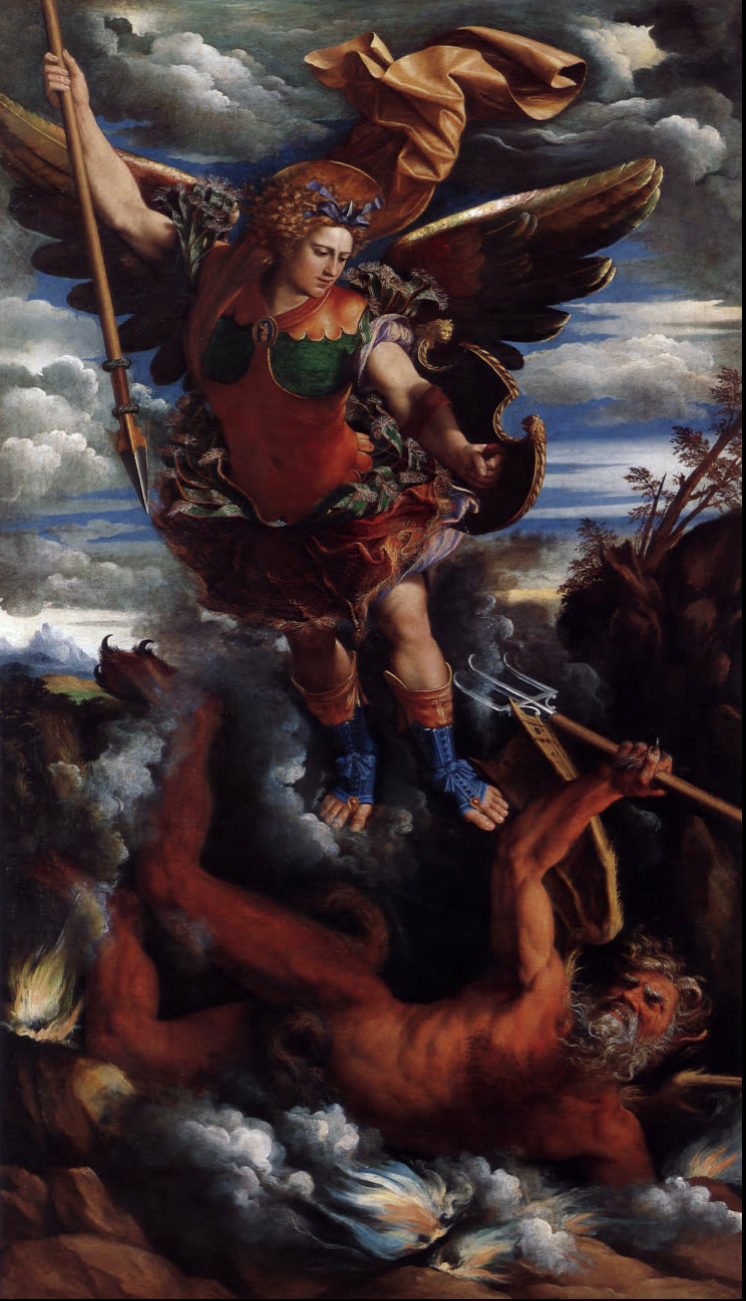
St. Michael Subdues Satan, 1540

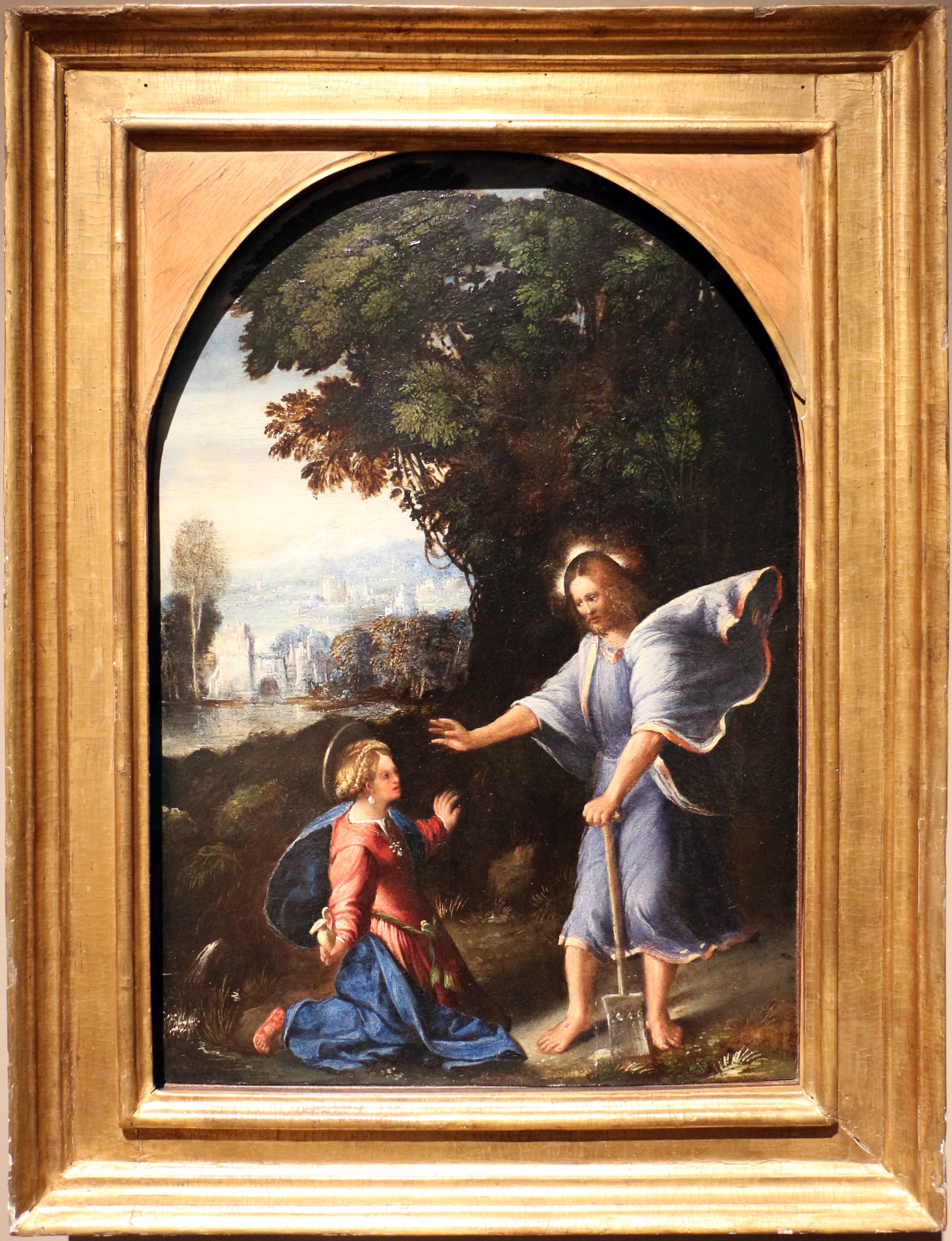
Noli me tangere, circa 1520

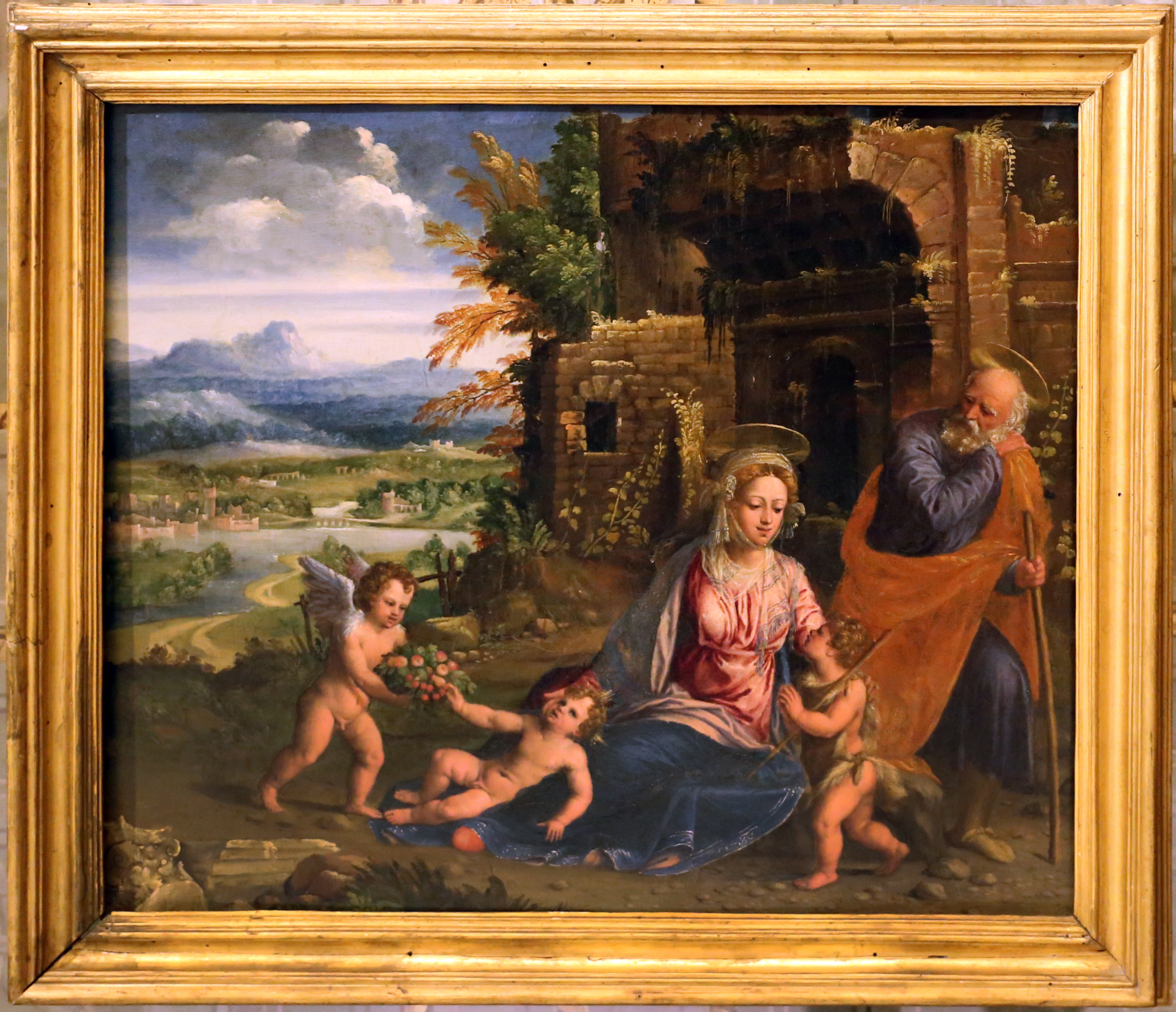
Holy Family with San Giovannino and an Angel
