= Margherita Gonzaga, Duchess of Ferrara =

Margherita Gonzaga
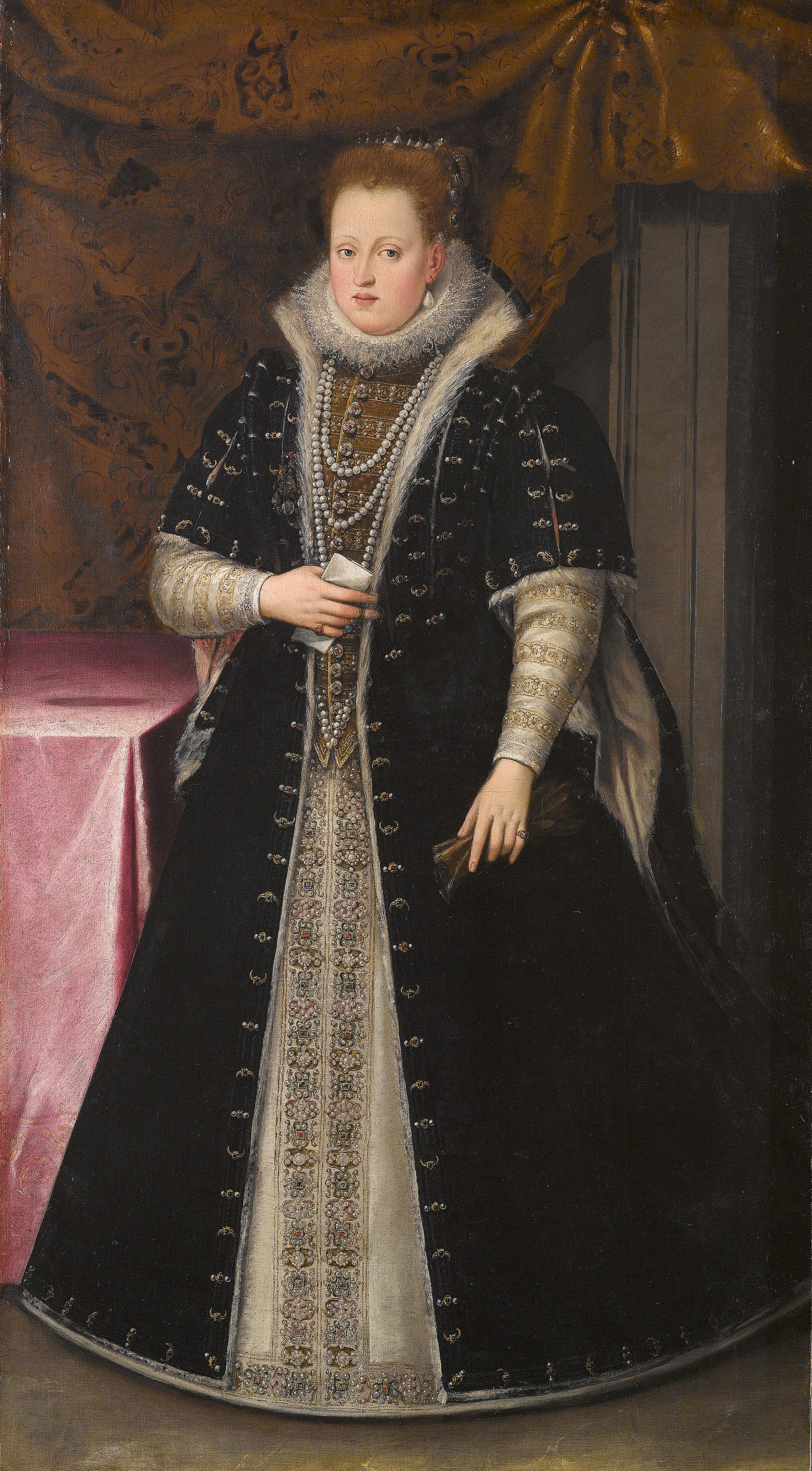
- Portrait by Jean Bahuet, 1590.

Duchess consort of Ferrara
- Tenure: 24 February 1579 – 27 October 1597

Duchess consort of Modena and Reggio
- Tenure: 24 February 1579 – 27 October 1597
- Born: 27 May 1564; Mantua, Duchy of Mantua
- Died: 6 January 1618 (aged 53); Mantua, Duchy of Mantua
- Burial: Church of Sant'Orsola, Mantua
- Spouse: Alfonso II d'Este, Duke of Ferrara, Modena and Reggio (m. 1579; died 1597)
- Father: Guglielmo Gonzaga, Duke of Mantua
- Mother: Archduchess Eleanor of Austria

Margherita Barbara Gonzaga (27 May 1564 – 6 January 1618), was an Italian noblewoman, Duchess consort of Ferrara, Modena and Reggio between 1579 and 1597 by marriage to Alfonso II d'Este, Duke of Ferrara, Modena and Reggio. She was a significant cultural patron in Ferrara and Modena.

She acted as Regent for the Duchy of Montferrat during the absence of her brother in 1610 and in 1602, as well as the de facto Regent of the Duchy of Mantua and Montferrat in the period between the death of her nephew in 1612 and the enthronement of her other nephew.

== Life ==
=== Early years ===
Born in Mantua on 27 May 1564, Margherita Barbara was the second child and first daughter of Guglielmo Gonzaga, Duke of Mantua and Archduchess Eleanor of Austria. Her paternal grandparents were Federico II Gonzaga, Duke of Mantua and Margherita Paleologa, ruling Marquise of Montferrat. Her maternal grandparents were Ferdinand I, Holy Roman Emperor and Anna of Bohemia and Hungary. She was named after both her paternal grandmother and maternal aunt Archduchess Barbara of Austria, Duchess consort of Ferrara, Modena and Reggio.

At the court in Mantua, Margherita grew up with her older brother, Vincenzo Gonzaga (later Duke of Mantua and Montferrat) and her younger sister, Anna Caterina Gonzaga (by marriage Archduchess of Austria and Countess of Tyrol). Margherita felt a deep affection for her brother, both having strong-willed characters and notable ambition. The upbringing of the princess included strict adherence to all religious practices. She also studied literature and Latin; later Margherita herself wrote books in this language. Under the influence of her father, a music lover and composer, the princess learned to play musical instruments, sing and dance.

=== Marriage ===
In 1578 Duke Guglielmo Gonzaga began negotiations for a marriage between his 14-year-old daughter Margherita with the 45-year-old Alfonso II d'Este, Duke of Ferrara, Modena and Reggio. With this union, the Duke of Mantua hoped to restore the political alliance between the Houses of Gonzaga and Este and create a coalition together with the Houses of Savoy and Farnese against the House of House of Medici, whose head had received from the Emperor the title of Grand Duke.

Alfonso II d'Este was twice a widower; his two previous wives, Lucrezia de' Medici and Barbara of Austria (Margherita's maternal aunt), died without giving birth to an heir. In 1567 the Papal Bull Prohibitio alienandi et infeudandi civitates et loca Sanctae Romanae Ecclesiae of Pope Pius V prohibited illegitimate children (or their descendants) from being invested in Church fiefdoms; without any other close agnate apart from his cousin Cesare d'Este (whose father was an illegitimate son of Alfonso I d'Este, Duke of Ferrara) and with the fear that his family could lose the Duchy of Ferrara, Duke Alfonso II decided he must contract a third marriage.

On 24 February 1579 the marriage by proxy was celebrated in Mantua. On 27 May of the same year, accompanied by a procession led by her brother, Margherita solemnly entered Ferrara. The princess was greeted by the Duke's courtiers with lighted torches and emblems depicting a flame and the motto in Latin “Ardet aeternum” (May it burn forever), which signified the Duke's promise to his young wife to love her forever.

=== Duchess of Ferrara ===
At the court in Ferrara, Margherita provided patronage to poets, painters and musicians. As the Duchess, she took music lessons from the court Maestro di cappella Ippolito Fiorini. In order to please his young wife, Duke Alfonso II reorganized the concerto delle donne, which before her time had been a group of singing aristocratic courtiers. These were mostly the new Duchess' ladies in waiting, and the concerts were frequently held in her apartments.

Under Margherita, by 1582, this group of singing music-lovers had been transformed into a chamber ensemble of professional singers and performers. The ensemble consisted of three sopranos: Laura Peverara, Livia d'Arco, Anna Guarini and Vittoria Bentivoglio; In addition, there were also players of harp, viola and lute, bass Giulio Cesare Brancaccio (later replaced by bass Melchiore Palontrotti); the harpsichord was played by Luzzasco Luzzaschi and the archlute and Bandora were played by Ippolito Fiorini.

In January 1582, Margherita gave a ball at which she danced with eleven other women, half of whom were dressed in men's clothing — some were also part of the concerto delle donne, including Laura Peverara (who cross-dressed in at least one instance), Anna Guarini, and Livia d'Arco, at least in 1582 and 1583, as well as Vittoria Bentivoglio, a member of the first incarnation of the concerto. The ball was given twice — with and without masks, with the dances being accompanied by singing and musical performance of the concerto delle donne. This groundbreaking female-only dance group was called balletto delle donne; they performed not only at the Duchess's balls, but also at other events, for example, at the wedding of the composer Carlo Gesualdo, Prince of Venosa and Eleonora d'Este (cousin of Margherita's husband) in 1594.

Instead of the balletto being a spontaneous dance among the courtiers, as it had been up until 1579, it became an elaborate and well-rehearsed entertainment. These entertainments frequently included the women cross-dressing, which was often commented on by contemporary chroniclers. Alfonso II assisted in these entertainments by helping to keep the floor cleared and other small favors, however, he was not as personally involved in them as Margherita, who danced in them herself, nor was he as involved with them as he was with the concerto delle donne. One ballet was composed and performed in honor of the marriage, on 22 February 1581, of Laura Peverara, who was very highly esteemed by the Ducal couple.

The programs for the balletto were made handwritten rather than printed, and none survive. Alfonso II kept the entertainments at his court highly secret, and one contemporary wrote that the entertainments were so private that the program was unobtainable, not even to be sent to Cardinal Luigi d'Este, the Duke's younger brother. Luzzasco Luzzaschi and Ippolito Fiorini wrote the music for the balletto, and Giovanni Battista Guarini wrote the texts; however, these do not survive. This entertainment probably continued until the end of the Este court in 1597, when the city was taken over by the Papacy.

Among the poets at Margherita's court were Tarquinia Molza and Torquato Tasso, who dedicated their works to her. The latter was admitted to St. Anne's Hospital suffering from a mental disorder, but he was later able to return to society, thanks to the patronage of the Duchess's brother.

A great number of madrigals and anthologies of madrigals were dedicated to the Duchess, either singly or to both herself and her husband. These include a number of madrigals by the maestro di capella of Cardinal Luigi d'Este, Luca Marenzio, including "Lucida perla", to a text by Giovanni Battista Guarini for her wedding; "O verdi selvi" with text by Tasso, as well as a number of madrigals with texts by Tasso dedicated to Margherita's dwarf or nana, Isabella, such as "Là dove sono i pargoletti Amori".

Margherita also took an active part in her husband's leisure time. Together they traveled, hunted and angling. The Duchess also patronized the local theater and kept actors at the court. Margherita's special passion were dogs, which she bred in large numbers. As she grew older, the Duchess began to take part in charitable works, such as founding the Orphanage of Saint Margaret in Ferrara, for the maintenance of which a special tax on the oil trade was introduced in the Duchy.

=== Widowhood ===
As in his previous two marriages, Alfonso II was childless in his marriage with Margherita. Contemporaries associated the Duke's inability to produce heirs with a trauma he received in childhood when he fell from a horse. He tried with all his might to avoid the annexation of the Duchy of Ferrara, which was a fief of the Papal States. To this end, he even participated in a crusade against the Ottoman Empire. But after the death of Alfonso II on 27 October 1597, Pope Clement VIII did not recognize Cesare d'Este as Alfonso II's heir. Instead, on 28 January 1598 the Duchy of Ferrara was officially incorporated into the Papal States and the Ducal court moved to Modena. However, most of the movable property of the Ducal Palace of Ferrara and the adjacent garden remained in the ownership of the House of Este and passed to Margherita, now Dowager Duchess.

In his will Margherita's late husband ordered she be paid the amount of 200,000 ducats plus an annuity of 4,000 ducats annually. On 20 December 1597, the Dowager Duchess left Ferrara and returned to Mantua. On her way back she was accompanied by a retinue sent by her brother, Vincenzo, Duke of Mantua and Montferrat. At his court, she bore the title of "Most Serene Lady of Ferrara" (Serenissima Signora di Ferrara). And here, the Dowager Duchess was able to display her political talents. Such that, in June 1601, her brother appointed her Regent of the Duchy of Montferrat, before he went to war with the Ottoman Empire in Hungary.

During this time, acting on behalf of her brother, she began secret negotiations for the marriage of her nephew Francesco Gonzaga, Hereditary Prince of Mantua and Princess Margaret of Savoy, the eldest daughter of Charles Emmanuel I, Duke of Savoy; the marriage was concluded in 1608. At the end of 1601, Margarita returned to Mantua from Montferrat. From June to October 1602, she again acted as Regent there.

The Dowager Duchess continued to do good works in Mantua. In 1599, on the outskirts of Borre, she founded a convent for tertiary Franciscan women. In 1602 she helped the Theatines, an order of Catholic men, find a place to settle. In 1603, Margaret decided to found a new monastery for another group of tertiary Franciscan women on the outskirts of Pradella, assigning for it maintenance of 25,000 ducats. She commissioned the prefect of the ducal factories, Antonio Maria Viani, to build a larger and more worthy religious building than the already existing one.

The final building was the Church of Sant'Orsola, whose construction was finally completed in 1608. On 21 October 1608, the Dowager Duchess settled in this monastery, but without taking monastic vows; she founded her court here, parallel to her brother's in the Ducal Palace. Under her, the Church of Sant'Orsola became a place where princesses from the House of Gonzaga and girls from local aristocratic families received a good education. She also continued to patronize women artists, including the artist and nun Lucrina Fetti. Margherita also collected a large collection of paintings, including works by Antonio Maria Viani, Ludovico Carracci, Parmigianino, Francesco Francia, Domenico Fetti and many other painters.

In the last years of her life, Margherita devoted more time to prayer, but continued to pay close attention to the political situation of the Duchy of Mantua. On 9 February 1612 her brother Duke Vincenzo died, and was succeeded by his oldest son Francesco IV Gonzaga, who reigned only ten months, dying of smallpox on 22 December 1612, just a few weeks after the death of his only son, 17-month-old Ludovico, also from smallpox.

Margherita became Regent of the Duchies of Mantua and Montferrat once more until the arrival of her other nephew, Cardinal Ferdinando Gonzaga, who gave up his ecclesiastical titles in order to become the new Duke of Mantua. Following the banishment of Margaret of Savoy, who had acted as Regent, the new Duke entrusted to his aunt Margherita the care of Francesco IV's only surviving child, 3-year-old Maria Gonzaga, rightful heiress of the Duchy of Montferrat.

Margherita Barbara Gonzaga died in Mantua on 8 January 1618 aged 53 and was buried in the Church of Sant'Orsola, which she founded. In memory of the Dowager-Duchess of Ferrara, an epitaph was published with verses by poets who knew her during her lifetime.

== Ancestry ==
Ancestors of Margherita Gonzaga, Duchess of Ferrara

Francesco II Gonzaga, Marquess of Mantua
Federico II Gonzaga, Duke of Mantua
Isabella d'Este
Guglielmo Gonzaga, Duke of Mantua
William IX, Marquess of Montferrat
Margaret Paleologa
Anne d'Alençon
Margherita Gonzaga
Philip I of Castile
Ferdinand I, Holy Roman Emperor
Joanna of Castile
Archduchess Eleanor of Austria
Vladislaus II of Bohemia and Hungary
Anna of Bohemia and Hungary
Anna of Foix-Candale

== Notes ==
Margherita Gonzaga House of Gonzaga Born: 27 May 1564 Died: 6 January 1618
Royal titles
Vacant Title last held by Barbara of Austria	Duchess consort of Ferrara, Modena, and Reggio; 24 February 1579 – 27 October 1597	Succeeded by Virginia de' Medici
