= Lodovico Agostini =

Italian composer (1534–1590)

Lodovico Agostini (1534 – 20 September 1590) was an Italian composer, singer, priest, and scholar of the late Renaissance. He was a close associate of the Ferrara Estense court, and contributed to the progressive secular style which developed there at the end of the 16th century.

== Life ==
Lodovico Agostini was born in Ferrara, and spent most of his life there. He was the illegitimate son of Agostino Agostini, a singer and priest of Ferrara mostly active in the 1540s. Lodovico may have studied for a time in Rome, based on the evidence of a madrigal published there, and he became a priest. By 1572, he was singing in the chapel of Ferrara Cathedral, and by 1578 he was on the payroll of Duke Alfonso II d'Este, a patron of music. Agostini remained in his service for the rest of his life.

In the 1580s, Agostini was a composition teacher to the Duke of Mantua, Guglielmo Gonzaga, and Agostini dedicated a book of madrigals to him. Gonzaga went on to become a composer of madrigals himself.

Agostini was on good terms with many members of the aristocracy, as well as the famous poets Tasso and Guarini, and other musicians at the court, including Luzzasco Luzzaschi.

While retaining his association with the secular Estense court, he also had an ecclesiastical career, eventually becoming a Monsignore and an apostolic protonotary.

== Music and influence ==
Agostini was fond of musical enigmas, puzzles, surprise and double-entendre, and his many musical collections display this. Enigmi musicali and L'echo, et enigmi musicali are canons to be solved by riddles, full of unusual chromatic progressions, instrumental interpolations, and other musical curiosities. Some of his books of madrigals are written in a virtuoso singing style intended for the three members of the concerto di donne of the time: Laura Peverara, Anna Guarini, and Livia d'Arco. His third book of madrigals, for six voices (1582), appears to be the earliest collection of the actual repertory of this ensemble.

Agostini was also a composer of accompanied solo song; since many of the performers at the court were instrumentalists in addition to singers (for example Livia d'Arco was a virtuoso player of the viol) he wrote for both lute and viol as accompaniment to solo singers.

No liturgical music by Agostini has survived, and it is unknown whether he had written any. One of his last compositions is Le lagrime del peccatore, a setting of poems by Luigi Tansillo, as a set of madrigali spirituali; it is similar in intent, if not in musical means, to the set Lagrime di San Pietro by Orlando di Lasso, also based on poems by Tansillo.

Agostini died in 1590.
