= Livia d'Arco =

Italian singer (c.1565–1611)

Livia d'Arco (c. 1565–1611) was an Italian singer in the court of Alfonso II d'Este in Ferrara.

== Biography ==
She was sent there with the household of Margherita Gonzaga d'Este at the time of Margherita's marriage to Alfonso in 1579, and was a young woman at the time, around fifteen. Livia was the daughter of a minor Mantuan nobleman from Arco family, and was perhaps sent to the court in Ferrara because of her musical potential. When she arrived, she began studying the viol with Luzzasco Luzzaschi and Ippolito Fiorini. After a few years of study she joined Laura Peverara, Tarquinia Molza and Anna Guarini in the Concerto delle donne; the first record of her singing with them was in 1582. Like the other members of the Concerto, poems were written in her honor, specifically by Torquato Tasso and Angelo Grillo under the pseudonym Livio Celiano. In 1585 she was married to Count Alfonso Bevilacqua.

== Bibliography ==
- Stras, Laurie (October 2002). "Livia d'Arco - Biography". Archived from the original on 7 March 2016.
