= Alfonso Fontanelli =

Italian composer

Alfonso Fontanelli (15 February 1557 – 11 February 1622) was an Italian composer, writer, diplomat, courtier, and nobleman of the late Renaissance. He was one of the leading figures in the musically progressive Ferrara school in the late 16th century, and one of the earliest composers in the seconda pratica style at the transition to the Baroque era.

== Life ==
Fontanelli was born in Reggio nell'Emilia, the son of Count Emilio Fontanelli. His early musical education was with composer Gasparo Pratoneri, and he evidently showed a talent for writing as well; a number of his lyric poems survive.

He married for the first time in 1580, and in 1584 began his career as a courtier, statesman, and musician to the Este family in Ferrara. It was in the employ of the Este family that he first went to Rome in 1586; while there he probably met the renowned madrigalist Luca Marenzio, as well as members of the Roman school of composition, aspects of whose style appear in his music. His diplomatic activity while in Rome enhanced his reputation greatly, for in 1588 he received two honors: he was named "music counselor" to the Accademia de Parteni in Ferrara, and he was made a gentleman of the Ferrara court. He rose steadily in influence between then and its dissolution in 1597, when the ruling Este family was removed to Modena and the region of Ferrara was absorbed into the Papal States.

Fontanelli probably wrote most of his surviving compositions during the 1590s, and immediately after 1600. Not only was he active as a musician at the Ferrara court during the earlier part of this period, but he was active as a diplomat and statesman, traveling to the Gonzaga court in Mantua and the Medici in Florence, and mingling with local musicians in each place. In 1594, he traveled extensively with Carlo Gesualdo, going to Venice, Florence, Naples, and Venosa with the notorious composer and murderer. A correspondence from himself to his patron Alfonso II d'Este survives, containing much information on musical practice of the period. In 1591, Fontanelli's first wife died, and he married again, to Maria Biancoli, a marriage which was to prove troublesome.

After the Este family moved to Modena, Fontanelli followed them there, maintaining his capacity as a diplomat: in 1600 and 1601, he went to Rome and Florence on their behalf. In November 1601, he discovered that his wife had been having an affair, and he murdered her lover (unlike Gesualdo, who in similar circumstances murdered them both, Fontanelli spared his wife); as a punishment he was stripped of his possessions and banished from the Este lands. He found refuge with the opulent Roman household of Cardinal Alessandro d'Este, the younger brother of Duke Cesare who had banished him from Modena, and continued his musical life in Rome. By 1605 he had repaired his ties with Duke Cesare, and became the official representative of the Este family in Rome. Whether he repented of the murder, or was retained because of his exceptional skill as a diplomat, is not known.

During the next ten years, he traveled widely, including a stay in Florence to try to mediate conflicts among the Medici court musicians, and a sojourn in Spain in 1611 and 1612 as the Este representative. By 1615, he evidently had settled in Rome, becoming prominent in the musical life there; however, no works of his from these years seem to have survived. Many surviving letters between members of the Roman aristocracy and church hierarchy however survive, giving many details of the musical life there, and Fontanelli's prominent position within it. Fontanelli became a priest in 1621, and died in early 1622 from an insect bite while in the Oratorio della Chiesa Nuova.

== Music and influence ==
Along with Luzzasco Luzzaschi and Carlo Gesualdo, Fontanelli was one of the leaders of the Ferrarese school of madrigal composition in the last decade of the 1590s. His music was long neglected, coming again to light again towards the end of the 20th century. Gustave Reese, in his encyclopedic Music of the Renaissance, never mentions him, yet Alfred Einstein, in his comprehensive The Italian Madrigal, praised him as being the finest of the nobleman-composers at the end of the 16th century, a category that would include Gesualdo as well as Alessandro Striggio.

Fontanelli apparently wrote only madrigals; neither sacred music nor specifically instrumental music has survived, even though he seems to have written some sacred music for the Oratorio dei Filippini at the Chiesa Nuova towards the end of his life. He published two books of madrigals, both for five voices: the first in Ferrara in 1595 printed by Vittorio Baldini, and the second in Venice in 1604 by Angelo Gardano. In addition, 16 other madrigals, some of which are of uncertain authorship, have been attributed to him.

Like Gesualdo and Luzzaschi, Fontanelli wrote madrigals which were intended to be appreciated by a small audience of connoisseurs, particularly the musica secreta of Alfonso II d'Este. Stylistically his music uses the most progressive techniques of the time, including chromaticism and cross-relations; unlike Gesualdo, however, the chromaticism is not a defining feature of his music. Most of Fontanelli's pieces are short, requiring less than three minutes to perform. None are obviously intended for arrangement for solo voice and accompaniment by a plucked chordal instrument (as are many of Luzzaschi's madrigals), being contrapuntal and disjunct in texture, and avoiding a dominant soprano line. Many of his madrigals, particularly from his first book, are written for two or three soprano voices, suggesting that they were written for the concerto delle donne.

The second book of madrigals (1604), some of which must have been written in Rome (but were published in Venice), contains some pieces in a simpler polyphonic style, recalling the madrigalian style of decades before. This style was harmonious with the tastes of the Roman School composers, performers, and listeners, who were more conservative than the esoteric Ferrara school, and unaccustomed to its experimental music.
