= 1601 in music =

The following events took place in the year 1601 in the world of music.

== Events ==
- November – Paul Peuerl becomes organist at Horn, Austria.
- Claudio Monteverdi is appointed maestro di musica to Duke Vincenzo Gonzaga at Mantua.
- Giovanni Bassano succeeds Girolamo Dalla Casa as head of the instrumental ensemble at St Mark's Cathedral, Venice.
- English composer and organist Thomas Hunt supplicates for degree of MusB at University of Cambridge.

== Publications ==
- Gregor Aichinger – Odaria lectissima ex melitiss. D. Bernardi jubilo delibata... (Augsburg: Officina Praetoriana), a collection of sacred songs for three and four voices
- Adriano Banchieri – Il Metamorfosi musicale, fourth book of canzonettas for three voices (Venice: Ricciardo Amadino)
- Valerio Bona
  - Second book of masses and motets for two choirs (Venice: Ricciardo Amadino)
  - First book of madrigals and canzonas for five voices (Venice: Angelo Gardano)
- Joachim Burmeister – Geistlicher Psalmen D. M. L. und anderer gottseligen Menner for four voices (Rostock: Stephan Myliander)
- Giulio Caccini – Le nuove musiche (The New Music) (Florence: Giorgio Marescotti)
- Giovanni Croce
  - Sacrae cantiones for five voices (Venice: Giacomo Vincenti)
  - First book of canzonettas for three voices (Venice: Giacomo Vincenti)
- Christoph Demantius – 77 neue außerlesene, liebliche, zierliche, polnischer und teutscher Art, Täntze mit und ohne Texten for four and five voices (Nuremberg: Catharina Dieterich for Konrad Baur)
- Johannes Eccard – Braut Lied (Ein treu Gemahl) for six voices (Königsberg: Georg Osterberger), a wedding song
- Melchior Franck – First book of sacrae melodiae for four, five, six, seven, and eight voices (Augsburg: Schönigian)
- Andrea Gabrieli – Mascherate for three, four, five, six, and eight voices (Venice: Angelo Gardano), published posthumously, also includes pieces by Ippolito Chamaterò, Orazio Vecchi, and Geminiano Capilupi
- Bartholomäus Gesius – Geistliche Deutsche Lieder (Sacred German Songs) for four and five voices (Frankfurt an der Oder: Johann Hartmann)
- Gioseffo Guami – Partitura per sonare delle canzonette alla francese (Venice: Giacomo Vincenti)
- Adam Gumpelzhaimer – Sacrorum concentuum, book one, for eight voices (Augsburg: Valentin Schönigk)
- Hans Leo Hassler
  - Lustgarten neuer teutscher Gesäng for four, five, six, and eight voices (Nuremberg: Paul Kauffmann)
  - Sacri concentus, book 1 (Augsburg: Valentin Schönigk)
- Jakob Hassler – Magnificat octo tonorum for four voices (Nuremberg: Paul Kauffmann), also includes a mass and a setting of Psalm 51
- Joachim van den Hove – Florida (Utrecht: Salomon de Roy & Johannes Guilielmus de Rhenen)
- Claude Le Jeune – The 150 Psalms for four and five voices (Paris: the widow of R. Ballard and his son Pierre Ballard), published posthumously
- Luzzasco Luzzaschi – Madrigali ... per cantare, et sonare a 1, 2, e 3 soprani (Rome: Simone Verovio), featuring works written before 1597 for the Concerto delle donne
- Tiburtio Massaino – Third book of motets for six voices (Venice: Ricciardo Amadino)
- Simone Molinaro – Second book of motets for eight voices (Milan: Simon Tini & Francesco Besozzi)
- Philippe de Monte – last of thirty-four books of madrigals
- Thomas Morley (ed.) – Madrigales The Triumphs of Oriana, to 5. and 6. voices: composed by divers severall aucthors
- Asprilio Pacelli – Madrigali... libro primo, a quattro voci (Venice, Giacomo Vincenti)
- Pietro Paolo Paciotto – Motecta festorum totius anni cum Communi Sanctorum..., book 1 (Rome, Nicolo Mutii)
- Giovanni Pierluigi da Palestrina – Twelfth book of masses, published posthumously
- Orfeo Vecchi
  - The seven penitential psalms for six voices (Milan: the heirs of Simon Tini & Giovanni Francesco Besozzi)
  - Psalmi in totius anni solemnitatibus (Psalms for the solemnities of the whole year) (Milan: the heirs of Simon Tini & Giovanni Francesco Besozzi)

== Classical music ==
- Ballet du Roy Henry IV

== Musical theatre ==
- Adriano Banchieri – Il metamorfosi musicale, a madrigal comedy

== Opera ==
- none listed

== Births ==
- date unknown – Michelangelo Rossi, opera composer (died 1656)
- probable – Jacques Champion de Chambonnières, French harpsichordist and composer (died 1672)

== Deaths ==
- January 4 – Laura Peverara, singer (born c 1550)
- May 19 – Costanzo Porta, composer (born c 1528)
- November 26 – Benedetto Pallavicino, organist and composer (b. c. 1551)
- date unknown – Girolamo Dalla Casa, composer
