= Vittorio Baldini =

Italian printer and publisher (fl. 1567–1618)

- Died: 21 February 1618; Venice, Italy
- Occupation(s): Italian printer and engraver

Vittorio Baldini (died 21 February 1618) was an Italian printer and engraver. He started publishing in Venice, where he was born, and later moved to Ferrara, joining the court of Duke Alfonso II d'Este in mid-to-late 1582, where he was the official ducal music printer. He may have met the duke through Giulio Cesare Brancaccio, whose translation and commentary on Julius Caesar's Commentarii de Bello Gallico Baldini printed in early 1582.

His first work as ducal music printer, and indeed his first print of music, was an anthology of madrigals, Il lauro secco (1582), written by the most renowned composers of Rome and Northern Italy, as well as introducing important new composers, and was inspired by Laura Peverara. He later printed the anthology Il lauro verde (1583), meant as a companion to Il lauro secco, and presented to Peverara on the occasion of her marriage in late February 1583.

Baldini published very little music for Alfonso between 1586 and 1594, and began publishing regularly again 1594–1596, when he printed anthologies containing madrigals by some of the most important madrigalists of the seconda pratica, including Luzzasco Luzzaschi, Carlo Gesualdo, and Alfonso Fontanelli, all of whom were part of the Este court at the time. These books, however, may have been funded by Gesualdo, who was at the court for his marriage to Leonora d'Este. During the period Baldini printed little for Alfonso; he did print a number of treatises on music and art, including those by Giovanni Battista Aleotti and Ercole Bottrigari. After Ferrara devolved to the papacy, Baldini published under the imprint of "Episcopal or State Printer and Printer to the Academy of the Intrepidi." During this period he printed descriptions and texts for various intermezzos and other theatrical entertainments.

Baldini's works are set apart by the beauty of the lettering, the finery of their engraving, beautiful title pages, and high-quality paper. He used a number of signs, including a bell, Daedalus, and the sun.

== Partial list of publications ==
- Commentarii de Bello Gallico (1582) translation and commentary by Giulio Cesare Brancaccio
- Il lauro verde (1583)
- Il lauro secco (1582)
- La deca istoriale (1586) Francesco Patrizi
- La deca disputata (1586) Francesco Patrizi
- Gli artifitiosi et curiosi moti spiritali di Herrone (1589) Giovanni Battista Aleotti
- Della poesia rappresentativa (1598) Marc'Antonio Ingegneri
- Il melone (1602) Ercole Bottrigari
- Filli di Sciro (1607) Guidobaldo Bonarelli della Rovere
- Intermezzi (1610, 1612, 1614) Giovanni Battista Guarini
- Sommario delle vite de gl'imperatori romani : da C. Giulio Cesare Sino a Ferdinando II. con le lore effigie. Grignani, Roma 1637 digital

== Sources ==
- Adriano Cavicchi. "Vittorio Baldini", Grove Music Online, ed. L. Macy (accessed May 20, 2006), grovemusic.com (subscription access).
- Newcomb, Anthony (1980). The Madrigal at Ferrara, 1579–1597. Princeton, NJ: Princeton University Press. ISBN 0691091250.
