= Giulio Cesare Brancaccio =

Musician, actor, writer (1515–1586)

- Born: 1515; Naples, Kingdom of Naples
- Died: c. 1586
- Occupations: Courtier, cavalryman, actor, writer, bass singer
- Known for: Member of the musica secreta at the court of Ferrara; role in the 1558 siege of Calais
- Notable work: Translation and commentary on Commentarii de Bello Gallico (1581–1585)

Giulio Cesare Brancaccio (1515–1586) was a courtier, cavalier, actor, writer, and singer in a number of northern Italian courts throughout the sixteenth century, most notably the court at Ferrara.

== Life and career ==
He was born in 1515 in Naples to a noble family. He first appears in the historical record as a soldier in the service of the Kingdom of Naples 1535 and later as a singer and amateur actor, including for Ferrante Sanseverino, Prince of Salerno in Naples. He served in the army of Charles V and in 1554 he defected to France, mainly to escape sentence for having allegedly killed a Spanish soldier. Here he became a gentilhomme de la chambre du Roi under Henri II and later, his sons Francois II and Charles IX and achieved considerable fame for the leading role he played in the seiee and capture of Calais from the English in 1558. In 1571 he went to Vienna, Venice, Turin, Florence and in 1573 to Naples, where he subsequently joined the expedition of Don Juan to re-conquer Tunis for the Spanish. Later he lived in Rome, in the service of Cardinal Luigi d'Este. The first record of Brancaccio being at the court of Alfonso d'Este II in Ferrara is in 1577, singing with the ladies of the first period of the Concerto delle donne, the amateurs Lucrezia Bendidio, Leonora Sanvitale, and Vittoria Bentivoglio. In 1581 he published a translation and commentary on Julius Caesar's Commentarii de Bello Gallico in Venice, which survives in printings from 1581, 1582 (Vittorio Baldini), and 1585 (Aldo Manuzzio).

Brancaccio was brought to the court at Ferrara by Duke Alfonso II d'Este specifically to sing for his musica secreta, where he was highly prized as a skilled bass. According to one contemporary commentator, part of the agreement when Brancacio was brought in was that he was "not to talk of his miracles of war." Alfonso and Brancaccio did not get along very well, due in part to Brancaccio's resistance to being seen as a professional musician, a position he viewed as lower-status, more akin to that of a servant than a full member of the court, and in part because of Alfonso's impatience with Brancaccio's tendency to brag. While Brancaccio was in the duke's employ he received around 400 scudi per year (in 1582 this was 130 lire per month) as well as a house and horses whenever he wanted or had use for them. During this period Torquato Tasso and Giovanni Battista Guarini wrote poems in Brancaccio's honor.

In 1581, he was out of favor with the court, or more specifically the Duke because of his absence in Venice, where he was arranging the Venetian printing of his 'Commentarii de Bello Gallico'. He returned to the court in October 1581, but it was not to be for very long. In 1583 Brancaccio was fired for insubordination; he refused to sing on the spot for Anne, Duke de Joyeuse. In 1585 he tried to get back in the duke's good graces, including with the help of Giovanni Battista Guarini; however, he was unsuccessful. Newcomb describes the personality which comes through in these letters as "blustering, proud, preposterous, and rather touching.". The manuscript of a dialogue entitled 'Parthenio', which describes how to defeat the Turks is preserved, along with other writings, in the Biblioteca Ambrosiana in Milan.

The last evidence of his being alive is a letter dated 1586, and he is presumed to have died in that year or soon afterwards.
