= Isabella Bendidio =

Isabella Bendidio (Marchesa Bentivoglio) (13 September 1546 – after 1610) was a Ferrarese noblewoman who, along with her sister Lucrezia Bendidio, sang in the first incarnation of the concerto delle donne as part of the court's musica secreta.

She married Cornelio Bentivoglio, a powerful nobleman and member of the Bentivoglio family, in 1573, at which point she may have stopped singing at court. She was the mother of Guido and Enzo Bentivoglio, who were the earliest patrons of Girolamo Frescobaldi. She was also the aunt of Anna Guarini, who later replaced her in the concerto delle donne.
