= Claudio Pari =

Italian composer

Claudio Pari (1574 – after 1619) was an Italian composer, born in the County of Burgundy, which was then part of the Holy Roman Empire. He is classified in the late Renaissance and early Baroque eras. He was a competent madrigalist, well regarded by his peers, as well as a late representative of the musical style/ethos known as musica reservata.

== Life ==
Pari was born in Salines (Salins-les-Bains), Franche-Comté, Holy Roman Empire. While little is known about his early life, he probably came to the Italian peninsula or Sicily early in his life. He was at the monastery of S. Domingo in Palermo in 1598, where he fell afoul of the Inquisition; at an auto-da-fé there he was sentenced to row in the galleys for five years, on a charge of heresy. By 1611 at the latest he was back in Palermo, since he published a book of madrigals there.

Whatever his history as a heretic may have been, he must have been forgiven, for he was appointed to be music director at a Jesuit institution at Salemi (in western Sicily) in 1615. His final publication—his fourth book of madrigals—was in 1619 and nothing further is known about his life.

== Music and influence ==
Much of Pari's music is in the manneristic style which was characteristic of the transformation of Renaissance into Baroque, and in addition conforms closely to the idea of musica reservata: music of intense expressiveness, careful text setting, and elaborate contrapuntal techniques, most likely intended for an audience of connoisseurs. In this regard it resembles that of some of his contemporaries, including the madrigalists Gesualdo, Sigismondo d'India, Pomponio Nenna, and Giovanni de Macque, although Pari avoids the extreme chromaticism used by Gesualdo and never attained his fame.

Pari's only surviving music are three books of madrigals, all published in Palermo between 1611 and 1619. Three other books of madrigals written prior to 1611 are lost. The collection published in 1611 includes a setting of Guarini's famous Il pastor fido, and the 1619 collection is subtitled Lamento d'Arianna; it is clearly influenced by the famous composition by Monteverdi. In the Lamento d'Arianna collection, Pari derived most of the motivic material directly from Monteverdi, but worked it into a dense, archaic contrapuntal texture more akin to Gombert, who had died sixty years earlier, than to the currently popular style of monody.

The connection with Gombert may not have been coincidental. Gombert also spent time in the galleys, only being pardoned, according to one story, after the publication of a set of Magnificats dedicated to Emperor Charles V. It is possible that Pari not only knew Gombert's music but looked to his experience as inspiration to survive his own hard years of slavery; and the music akin to the dense contrapuntal style of Gombert was all composed after the end of Pari's sentence.

Although Pari had a liking for the dense counterpoint of the middle of the 16th century, he experimented with piquant dissonances, and also with the stile concertato, features which were quite contemporary; he also varied the texture widely within individual pieces as a way to highlight the dramatic contents of the text.

== Publications ==
- First book of madrigals (five voices), lost
- First book of madrigals (six voices), lost
- Il pastor fido, second book of madrigals (five voices), Palermo, 1611
- Third book of madrigals (five voices), Palermo, 1617
- Il lamento d'Arianna, fourth book of madrigals (five voices), Palermo, 1619

== References and further reading ==
- Paolo Emilio Carapezza, "Claudio Pari", in The New Grove Dictionary of Music and Musicians, ed. Stanley Sadie. 20 vol. London, Macmillan Publishers Ltd., 1980. ISBN 1-56159-174-2
- Paolo Emilio Carapezza/Giuseppe Collisani, "Claudio Pari", Grove Music Online ed. L. Macy (Accessed April 30, 2005), (subscription access)
- Paolo Emilio Carapezza, "Madrigalisti siciliani", Nuove effemeridi, no.11 (1990), 97–106
- F. Renda, "L'Inquisizione in Sicilia: i fatti, le persone" (Palermo, 1996)
