= Lucrezia Bendidio =

Italian singer and noblewoman (1547–after 1584)

Lucrezia Bendidio (Signora or Contessa Machiavella) (April 8, 1547 – after 1584) was an Italian singer and noblewoman from Ferrara.

She started as a lady-in-waiting for Leonora d'Este in 1561. Many poets wrote of her great skill as a singer, including Torquato Tasso and Giovanni Battista Pigna. She was in fact an early love of Tasso's in 1561, as well as of Cardinal Luigi d'Este and Pigna. Tasso's character "Licori" in his play Aminta was based on her.

She was part of the famous Concerto delle donne during its early period. She was later married to Count Baldassare Macchiavelli of Ferrara. With her sister Isabella Bendidio she sang for private court evenings as part of the musica secreta of the court.

Another sister, Taddea, married Giovanni Battista Guarini; their daughter Anna Guarini was a singer in the concerto delle donne during the second period.
