= Paolo Virchi =

Italian composer and instrumentalist

Paolo Virchi (also known as Targhetta; 1551 – 2 May 1610) was an Italian composer and instrumentalist. He was born in Brescia and his father was Girolamo Virchi, an instrument maker. He joined the court of Alfonso II d'Este between 1579 and 1580. On the court rolls, he is referred to as a singer, but in his publications he refers to himself as an organist and instrumentalist. He taught members of the court to sing, play the viol, and was one of few musicians at the court to receive a salary raise during his tenure there. Upon the dissolution of the court in 1597, he immediately joined the Gonzaga court in Mantua.

Virchi had several publications based all in Venice, including a book of cittern tablature and many madrigals, which Anthony Newcomb praised as being of equal skill as those of Luca Marenzio.
