= Vittoria Bentivoglio =

Italian singer

Vittoria Bentivoglio (1555–1587) was an Italian singer. She was active in the Ferrarese court of Alfonso II d'Este and a member of the first period of the court's concerto delle donne.

She was born into the noble Cybò family, and later married a member of the renowned Bentivoglio family. She remained a prominent member of the court even after she stopped singing regularly for the musica secreta.

She also danced in the balletto delle donne.
