= Church of Sant'Orsola (Mantua) =

Church building in Mantua, Italy

Coordinates: 45.1577°N 10.7864°E

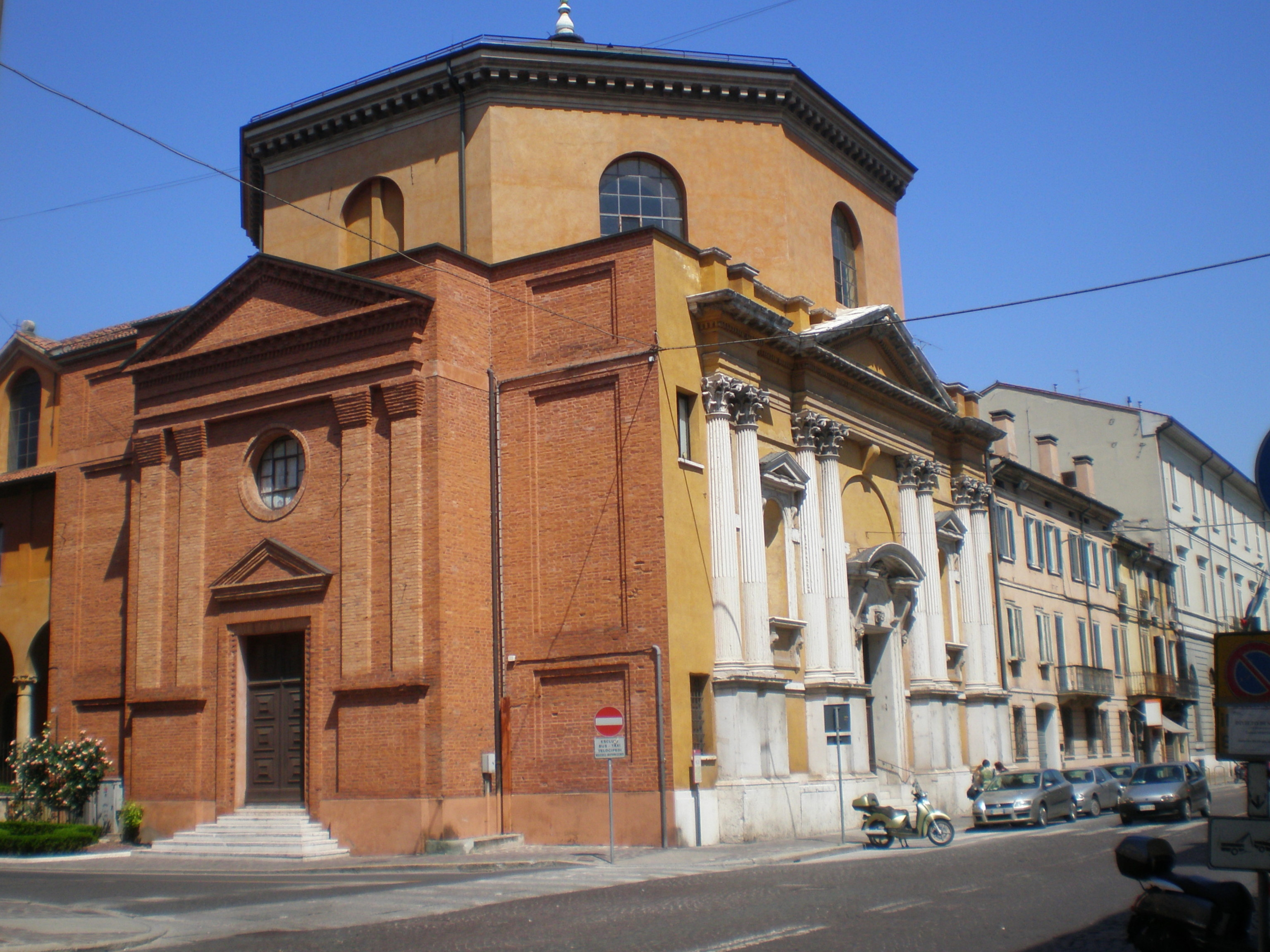
- Facade

Religion
- Affiliation: Roman Catholic

Location
- Location: Mantua, Italy
- Interactive map of Church of Sant'Orsola

Architecture
- Type: Church
- Style: Baroque
- Completed: 17th century

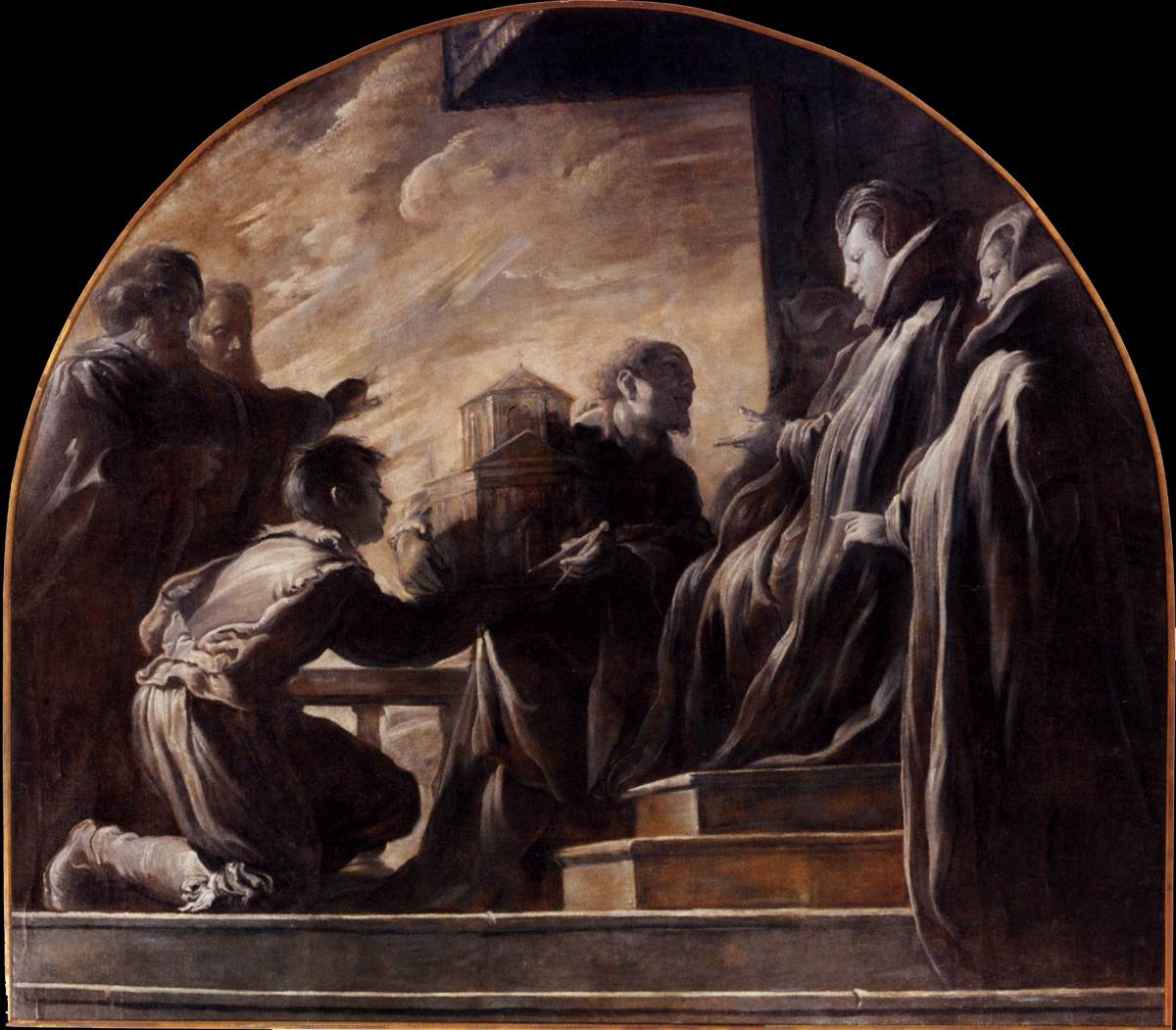
Margherita Gonzaga Receiving the Model of the Church of St Ursula, by Domenico Fetti, Palazzo Ducale of Mantua

The Church of Sant'Orsola (St Ursula) in Mantua, Italy, was designed and built in 1608 by Antonio Maria Viani, the architect of the ducal court of the House of Gonzaga. The church was commissioned by Margherita Gonzaga d'Este, the widow of Alfonso II d'Este. Margherita, while not a nun herself, as a widow came to live in an apartment in the Clarissan monastery that was once adjacent (destroyed in 1930).

The octagonal church was decorated by major regional artists including Domenico Fetti and his sister (and nun at the convent) Lucrina, Lodovico Carracci, Carlo Bonomi, and Antonio Maria Viani. After suppression of the convent in the 1780s, the convent had become a hospital.

== Bibliography ==
- Cynthia A. Gladen, Suor Lucrina Fetti: pittrice in una corte monastica seicentesca in I monasteri femminili come centri di cultura fra Rinascimento e Barocco, Roma 2005, Edizioni di storia e letteratura
