= Arco family =

Italian noble family

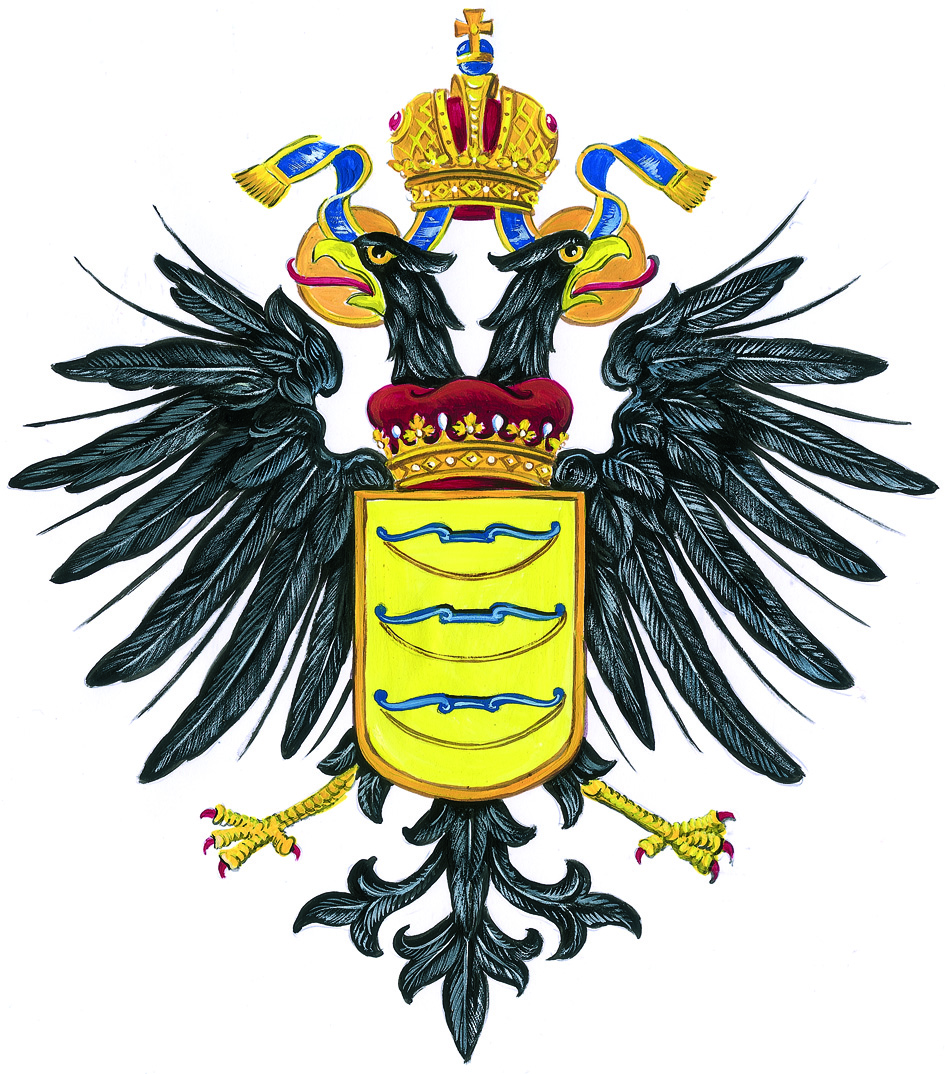
Coat of arms of Arco family

The House of Arco is an ancient noble family, originally from Arco, in Northern Italy. Members of the family played important roles within the Holy Roman Empire, Austro-Hungarian Empire and Italy.

== History ==
They were first attested to in 1124 and were recognized as free nobles in 1186. For many centuries, they held the Castle of Arco. In 1413, they became Imperial counts. In the 17th century, members of the family moved from Arco to Bavaria, Mantua, Salzburg, and Silesia. At the beginning of the 19th century, Bavarian branch split into three cadet lines: Arco auf Valley, Arco-Stepperg and Arco-Zinneberg. The family is still extant, primarily in Bavaria, but the Castle of Arco, which has been in the possession of the branch in Mantua has belonged to the municipality of Arco since 1982.

== Notable members ==
- Livia d'Arco (c. 1565–1611) was an Italian singer at the court of Alfonso II d'Este in Ferrara.
- Johann Baptist, Graf von Arco (c. 1650 – 21 March 1715, Munich) was a diplomat and Generalfeldmarschall in the service of the Electorate of Bavaria.
- Count Johann Philipp von Arco (11 May 1652 – 18 February 1704) was a soldier who served the Habsburg monarchy.
- Archduchess Maria Leopoldine of Austria-Este (10 December 1776 – 23 June 1848), was an Electress of Bavaria and later wife of Count Ludwig Joseph von Arco (1773-1854).
- Anton Graf von Arco auf Valley (5 February 1897 – 29 June 1945) was a German far-right activist and Bavarian nationalist.
- Count Georg von Arco (30 August 1869 in Großgorschütz – 5 May 1940 in Berlin) was a German physicist and a radio pioneer.
- Olympia von und zu Arco-Zinneberg (born 4 January 1988) is the consort of Jean-Christophe, Prince Napoléon, the disputed head of the House of Bonaparte.
