= Anna Guarini =

Italian virtuoso singer (1563–1598)

Anna Guarini, Contessa Trotti (1563 – 3 May 1598) was an Italian virtuoso singer of the late Renaissance. She was one of the most renowned singers of the age, and was one of the four concerto di donne at the Ferrara court of the d'Este family, for whom many composers wrote in a progressive style.

== Life and murder ==
She was the daughter of the famous poet Giovanni Battista Guarini, author of Il pastor fido. Details of her early years are scanty, but it is known that she began her employment with the court of the d'Este family at the age of seventeen, and immediately attracted attention for the beauty and control of her singing voice. In addition to singing, she was a talented player of the lute. The Duchess of Ferrara, Margherita Gonzaga d'Este, apparently kept her and the other three members of the concerto di donne (Laura Peverara, Tarquinia Molza and Livia d'Arco) as frequent companions wherever she went; and the four musicians sang so beautifully together that they became famous throughout Italy.

In 1585 she was married to Count Ercole Trotti. Circumstantial evidence suggests it was an arranged marriage; he was much older than she was, and there is also evidence that the marriage was not happy. In 1596 she was accused of having an affair with a member of the Duke's armed forces, Ercole Bevilacqua, who also had to flee Ferrara due to Trotti's suspicions that he was having an affair with Anna. Although Duke Alfonso had ordered Trotti not to harm Anna, the Duke died in 1597 and, on 3 May 1598, Trotti surprised Anna in her bedroom while she lay ill with a fever, and aided by an accomplice — her own brother, Girolamo — he murdered her with a hatchet.

Trotti not only was pardoned by the new Duke of Modena, Cesare d'Este, but increased in prestige. At any rate, in 1598 the period of musical experimentation at the Ferrara court ended with the takeover of the town by the Papal States under Pope Clement VIII.

== Influence ==
The addition of women's voices, and in particular the high soprano range, was one of the most significant events in the history of singing in the late 16th century. Prior to this time almost all music was written for male voices. Anna Guarini was one of the most influential of the virtuoso singers in the upper soprano range during this transitional period.

The four singers of the concerto di donne inspired numerous compositions by the leading composers of the court, including Luzzasco Luzzaschi, Lodovico Agostini, and others. In addition, their fame was so widespread that composers from elsewhere — such as the nobleman Carlo Gesualdo, Prince of Venosa (who also murdered his first wife) — came to Ferrara specifically to write music for them. Anna was famous for her vocal virtuosity and the beauty of her voice, and Agostini dedicated specific madrigals to her specifically in his third book of madrigals (1582). The vogue for music written for soprano voices was to prove durable; indeed it has never ended. Monteverdi's first book of madrigals (1587) features soprano voices as the main attraction; in most of the pieces the bass voice only enters after a rest of several bars, allowing the upper voices to begin.

The poet Torquato Tasso praised her in verse, in his Mentre in concento alterno, as did Agostini himself in the introduction to his 1582 madrigal collection.

== References and further reading ==
- Articles "Lodovico Agostini," "Este," "Ferrara," "Giovanni Battista Guarini" in The New Grove Dictionary of Music and Musicians, ed. Stanley Sadie. 20 vol. London, Macmillan Publishers Ltd., 1980. ISBN 1-56159-174-2 Note: there is no entry specifically on Anna Guarini in the 1980 edition.
