= Agostino Agostini =

Italian singer and composer (died 1569)

Agostino Agostini (died 20 September 1569) was a Renaissance era singer, composer and priest of Ferrara mostly active in the 1540s. He was a mansionary chaplain at the San Giorgio Cathedral in Ferrera, and his illegitimate son (sometimes listed as his nephew) was composer Lodovico Agostini, noted for publications of enigmatic canons.

It has been suggested that don Lodovico Agostini (1534-1590) was probably the nephew of Agostino.
