= Ippolito Fiorini =

Italian lutenist, composer, and music director

Ippolito Fiorini (c. 1549–1621) was a composer and lutenist, and the maestro di capella at the court of Alfonso II d'Este in Ferrara during its entire existence (1568–1597). As maestro di capella, his role was largely an administrative one. However, in addition to being involved with the music of the chapel, he also was involved with the concerto delle donne. He also played the archlute. He wrote music for the duchesses' balletti to the text of Giovanni Battista Guarini, although none is extant, and probably also wrote for the concerto delle donne. He was in charge of the Accademia della Morte in Ferrara from 1594 to 1597.
