= Word painting =

Use of musical composition to emulate lyrics or narrative

Word painting, also known as tone painting or text painting, is the musical technique of composing music that reflects the literal meaning of a song's lyrics or story elements in programmatic music.

== Historical development ==
Tone painting of words goes at least as far back as Gregorian chant. Musical patterns expressed both emotive ideas and theological meanings in these chants. For instance, the pattern fa-mi-sol-la signifies the humiliation and death of Christ and his resurrection into glory. Fa-mi signifies deprecation, while sol is the note of the resurrection, and la is above the resurrection, His heavenly glory ("surrexit Jesus"). Such musical words are placed on words from the Biblical Latin text; for instance when fa-mi-sol-la is placed on "et libera" (e.g., introit for Sexagesima Sunday) in the Christian faith it signifies that Christ liberates us from sin through his death and resurrection.

Word painting started getting popular in the late 15th century (such as in Josquin des Prez's motet "Huc me sydereo" where the voices descend in imitation on the phrase "Descendere jussit Olympo" (descending from Olympus)) developed especially in the late 16th century among Italian and English composers of madrigals, to such an extent that word painting devices came to be called madrigalisms. While it originated in secular music, it made its way into other vocal music of the period. While this mannerism became a prominent feature of madrigals of the late 16th century, including both Italian and English, it encountered sharp criticism from some composers. Thomas Campion, writing in the preface to his first book of lute songs in 1601, said of it: "... where the nature of everie word is precisely expresst in the Note … such childish observing of words is altogether ridiculous."

Word painting flourished well into the Baroque music period. One well-known example occurs in Handel's Messiah, where a tenor aria contains Handel's setting of the text:

Every valley shall be exalted, and every mountain and hill made low; the crooked straight, and the rough places plain. (Isaiah 40:4)

In Handel's melody, the word "valley" ends on a low note, "exalted" is a rising figure; "mountain" forms a peak in the melody, and "hill" a smaller one, while "low" is another low note. "Crooked" is sung to a rapid figure of four different notes, while "straight" is sung on a single note, and in "the rough places plain", "the rough places" is sung over short, separate notes whereas the final word "plain" is extended over several measures in a series of long notes. This can be seen in the following example:

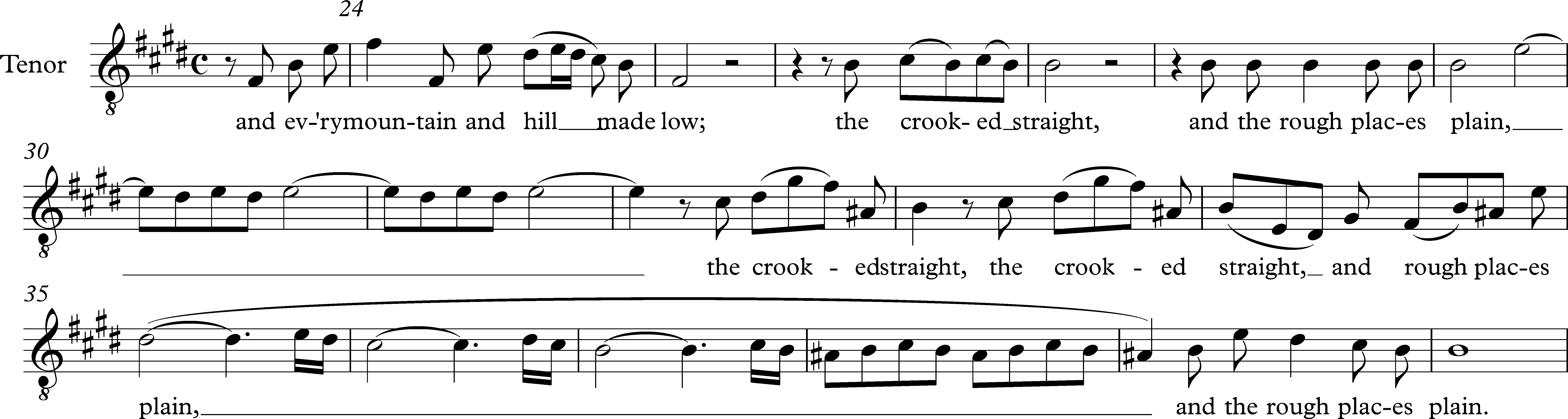

== In popular music ==
One example of word painting occurs in the song "Friends in Low Places" by Garth Brooks. During the chorus, Brooks sings the word "low" on a low note. Similarly, on The Who's album Tommy, the song "Smash the Mirror" contains the line "Rise, rise, rise, rise, rise, rise, rise, rise, rise, rise, rise, rise, rise...." Each repetition of "rise" is a semitone higher than the last, making this an especially overt example of word-painting.

"Hallelujah" by Leonard Cohen includes another example of word painting. In the line "It goes like this, the fourth, the fifth, the minor fall and the major lift, the baffled king composing hallelujah," the lyrics signify the song's chord progression.

In recordings of George and Ira Gershwin's "They Can't Take That Away from Me," Ella Fitzgerald and others intentionally sing the wrong note on the word "key" in the phrase "the way you sing off-key".

Queen use word through music recording technology in their song "Killer Queen" where a flanger effect is placed on the vocals during the word "laser-beam" in bar 17.

== See also ==
- Adolf Bernhard Marx
- Autological word
- Conceptual metaphor
- Cratylus (dialogue)
- Eye music
- Imitation
- Mickey Mousing
- Mimesis
- Musica reservata
- Program music
- Self-reference

== Sources ==
- M. Clement Morin and Robert M. Fowells, "Gregorian Musical Words", in Choral essays: A Tribute to Roger Wagner, edited by Williams Wells Belan, San Carlos (CA): Thomas House Publications, 1993
- Sadie, Stanley. Word Painting. Carter, Tim. The New Grove Dictionary of Music and Musicians. Second edition, vol. 27.
- How to Listen to and Understand Great Music, Part 1, Disc 6, Robert Greenberg, San Francisco Conservatory of Music
