= Anthony Newcomb =

American musicologist (1941–2018)

Anthony Newcomb (August 6, 1941 - November 18, 2018) was an American musicologist. He was born in New York City and studied at the University of California, Berkeley where he graduated with a Bachelor of Arts in 1962. He then studied with Gustav Leonhardt in the Netherlands while on a Fulbright Scholarship. He received an MFA (1965) and Ph.D from Princeton University in 1969.

In 1968 he joined the music faculty at Harvard University, and left in 1973 to join the faculty at Berkeley. In 1981 he won the Dent Medal, a prestigious award for musicology awarded by the Royal Musical Association. From 1986 to 1990 he was the editor of the Journal of the American Musicological Society. In 1990 he became Dean of Arts and Humanities at Berkeley, and later a professor emeritus. In 1992 he was elected to the American Academy of Arts and Letters.

Newcomb's early interest was in the Italian madrigal between 1540 and 1640, and especially the music of the concerto delle donne of Ferrara. His later interests included the works of Richard Wagner and the connection of 18th and 19th century instrumental works and questions of meaning. However, he remained active in research into Italian remaissance music until the end of his life, producing editions of the madrigals of Luzzasco Luzzaschi, Alfonso Fontanelli and Giovanni Maria Nanino.

== Works ==
- "Carlo Gesualdo and a Musical Correspondence of 1594", Musical Quarterly, liv (1968), pp 409–36
- Newcomb, Anthony (1980). The Madrigal at Ferrara, 1579-1597. Princeton, New Jersey: Princeton University Press. ISBN 0-691-09125-0.
- Women Making Music: the Western Musical Tradition, 1150-1950 ed. J. Bowers and J. Tick. "Courtesans, Muses, or Musicians: Professional women musicians in sixteenth-century Italy." pp. 90–115 by Anthony Newcomb. Urbana, IL. 1986. ISBN 0-252-01470-7
- In addition to many other scholarly articles, Newcomb has contributed a good many articles to the New Grove Dictionary of Music and Musicians.
