= Tarquinia Molza =

Italian singer and composer (1542–1617)

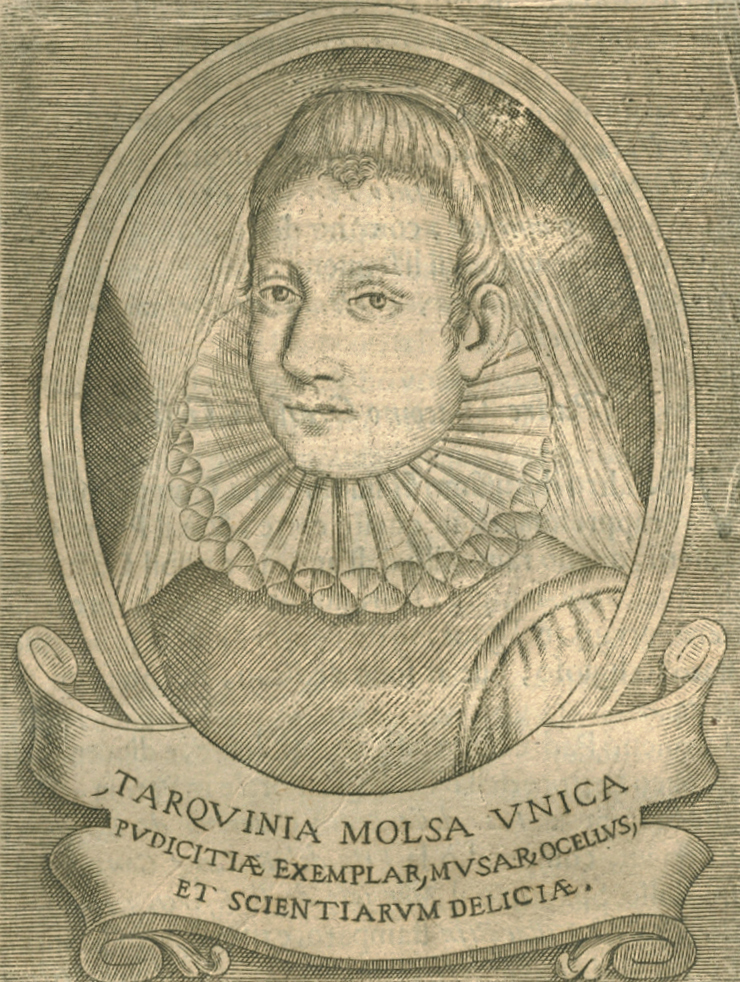
Tarquinia Molza

Tarquinia Molza (1 November 1542 – 8 August 1617) was an Italian singer, poet, conductor, composer, and natural philosopher. She was considered a great virtuosa. She was involved with the famous Concerto delle donne, although whether she sang with them or coached them is not clear. She also played the viola bastarda, viola da mano, clavier, and lute. Trained in both distinctly male and female singing styles, her contributions helped combine them into the madrigal of the late Renaissance.

== Early life and education ==
Molza was born in Modena, the granddaughter of the poet Francesco Maria Molza, and the daughter of Camillus and Isabella Colombi. She was the eldest of nine brothers and sisters. Her father agreed that she should have the same education as her brothers, and she learned Greek, Latin, Hebrew, and philosophy until she was sixteen. She studied with the scholar Giovanni Berettari, of Modena, called Poliziano, and learned astronomy from the mathematician Antony Guarini. She married Paolo Porrino in 1560, who supported her returning to school, where she studied with Francesco Patrizi. She was widowed by 1579.

== Musical career ==
Because she was widowed, she was recruited to become the lady-in-waiting to Duchess Margherita Gonzaga d'Este in 1583 and moved to Ferrara, where she became a famous performer, conductor, and composer. Molza was dismissed from her position in 1589 and returned to Modena when she was accused of having an affair with Flemish composer Giaches de Wert. Minor nobility (as ladies-in-waiting to the duchess were considered) were not to involve themselves with members of the servant class (as minor composers such as Wert were considered). She claimed that her relationship with Wert was a friendship, and not sexual.

== Works ==
Molza wrote poetry in Latin and Tuscan dialect; she also wrote essays.

Her Latin works include the following poems:

De Fonte: "Hoc fonte proprium est blandos inducere somnos"

De Cynthio Card. Aldobrandino: "Te celebrate, Cynthi, virtute insigne et ostro."

De Eodem: "Tu solus, Cynthi, te ipsum velut alter Apollo."

(Untitled): "Felsina clara Virum insignis, at clarior almae."

== Literary and Artistic Representations ==
Many artistic works were dedicated to her; Francesco Patrizi wrote about her singing in his treatise L'amorosa filosofia, and she was perhaps the first singer to have a published biography dedicated to her (Opuscoli inediti di Tarquinia Molza modenese by D. Vandelli).

Her name appears among those on the Heritage Floor of Judy Chicago's The Dinner Party.

== Honors ==
Molza was granted Roman citizenship in 1600, the only woman to have citizenship. The decree stated, "although the Senate has never accepted women in to the ranks of citizenship…[it is resolved that] Tarquinia Molza of Modena be numbered in the ranks of its most noble citizens with the title l'Unica, never before bestowed on anyone, in recognition of her singular virtues and merits."
