= Laura Peverara =

Italian singer (c.1550–1601)

Laura Peverara or Peperara (c. 1550 – 4 January 1601) was an Italian virtuoso singer who was also a harpist and dancer; born and raised in Mantua. Her father, Vincenzo, was a merchant, an intellectual who tutored princes, leading to Laura being brought up in courtly society. In the 1570s she was singing in Verona.

Alfred Einstein identified Laura as a member of the renowned musica secreta ensemble il Concerto delle donne in Ferrara. She was the first member, starting in 1580, and remained in the group until its dissolution in 1597. It is now clear from reappraisal of the source material that there were two concerti at Ferrara and that Einstein's "Three Ladies" are drawn from different groups. Peverara and Anna Guarini were the only two of the original members to sing at the ensemble's first recorded performance.

Three anthologies were put together in her honor, including one by Torquato Tasso (Il Lauro verde) in celebration of her marriage to Ferrarese Count Annibale Turco. In addition many madrigals were dedicated to her by Ferrarese composers, including ones by Giovanni Battista Gabella, Vittorio Baldini, and Giovanni Gabrieli.

== Related recordings ==
Selections of the madrigals dedicated to Laura may be found in:

- Madrigali per Laura Peperara Silvia Frigato & Miho Kamiya (sopranos) Silvia Rambaldi (harpsichord). Tactus 2010.
