= Giovanni Battista Guarini =

Italian poet, dramatist, and diplomat (1538–1612)

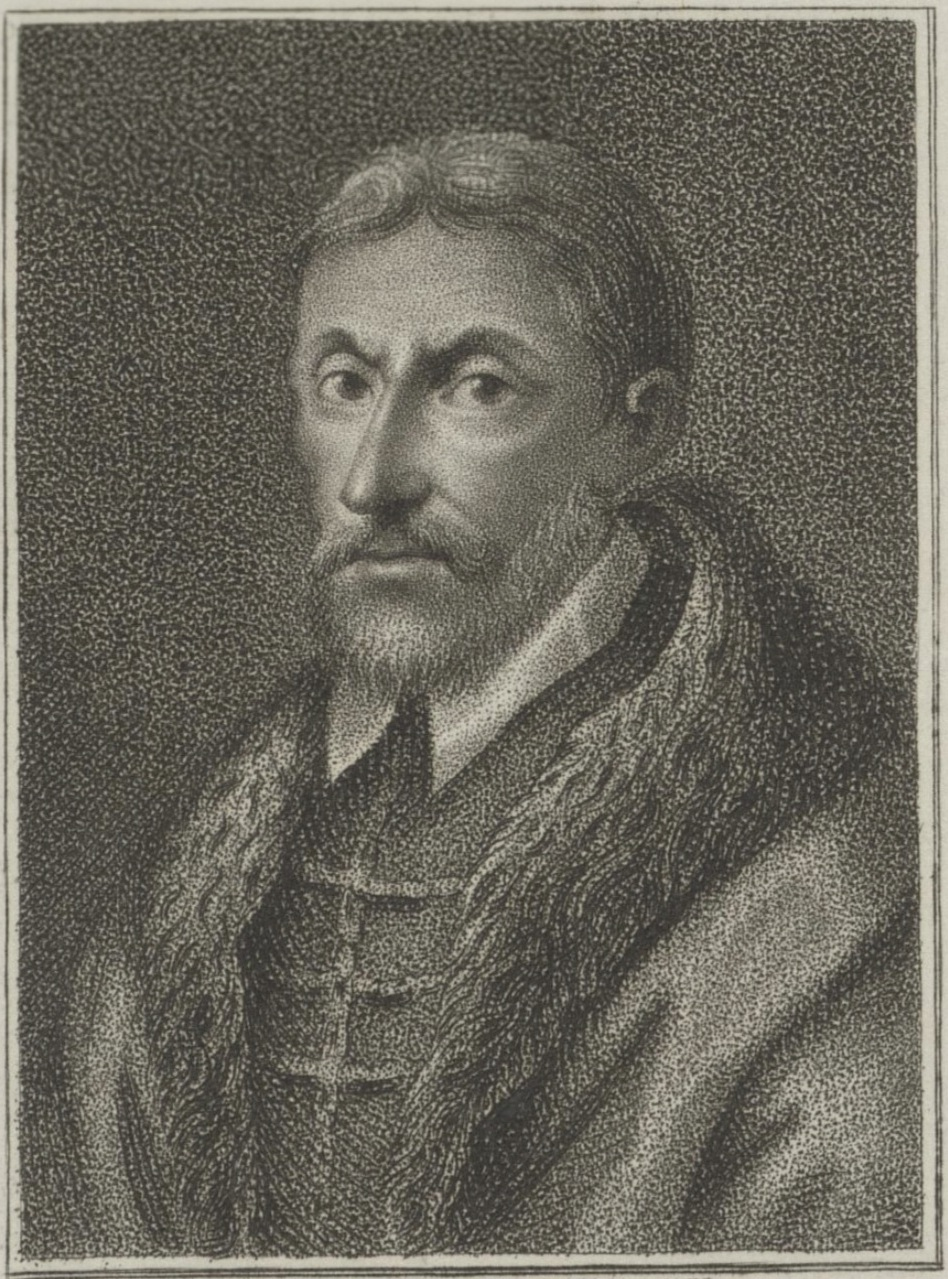
- Engraved portrait of Giovanni Battista Guarini by Arrigo Minasi (1812)
- Born: December 10, 1538; Ferrara, Duchy of Ferrara
- Died: October 7, 1612 (aged 73); Venice, Republic of Venice
- Occupations: Playwright, writer, poet, diplomat
- Parent(s): Francesco Guarini and Orsina Guarini (née Macchiavelli)
- Writing career
- Language: Italian
- Period: Renaissance
- Genre: Tragicomedy
- Subject: Pastoral
- Notable work: Il pastor fido
- Movement: Renaissance literature

Giovanni Battista Guarini (10 December 1538 – 7 October 1612) was an Italian poet, dramatist, and diplomat. Courtier at Ferrara, diplomat and secretary to several ruling families, he served also at Florence and Urbino. He is best known as the author of the pastoral tragicomedy Il pastor fido. Written in emulation of Tasso's Aminta, it was extremely successful and remained one of the most popular work of secular literature in Western Europe for almost two hundred years.

== Life ==
Guarini was born at Ferrara in 1538 of a family of Veronese origin. His father Francesco was the grandson of the famous Renaissance humanist Guarino da Verona. On the termination of his studies at the university of Padua, he was appointed professor of rhetoric and poetics at Ferrara. Soon after his appointment, he published a collection of sonnets which obtained for him great popularity as a poet. His marriage in about 1560 to Taddea, a sister of the famous Ferrarese singer Lucrezia Bendidio, resulted in eight children, with whom in later life he was much at odds.

In 1564 he joined the Paduan Accademia degli Eterei and in 1567 he entered the service of Alfonso II d'Este, Duke of Ferrara, who sent him on important diplomatic missions to Turin, Rome, Venice, and Poland. Unlike his younger rival Torquato Tasso, he seems to have had few difficulties in withstanding the pressures of courtly life. Although his masterpiece, Il pastor fido (published in 1590), was completed during a prolonged absence from the Este court, it is generally supportive of existing social structures.

After about 20 years of service, differences with the Duke led him to resign. Until his reconciliation with Alfonso in 1595 he moved from one court to another, prevented by the duke from obtaining a firm position. After Alfonso’s death in 1597 he went from Venice to Florence, where he served Ferdinando I de' Medici (1599–1601). He was also briefly attached to the Gonzagas at Mantua and to the Duke of Urbino (1602–4).

Later in his life, he returned to his native Ferrara. There he discharged one final public mission, that of congratulating Pope Paul V on his election (1605). In the late 1580s he was involved in a bitter polemic with Giason Denores, who objected in particular to Guarini's mixing of tragic and comic genres in his Pastor fido. He died in Venice, where he had been summoned to attend a lawsuit, on 7 October 1612, aged 73.

Guarini was a prominent member of several academies, including the Eterei of Padua, the Crusca of Florence, the Innominati of Parma, the Gelati of Bologna, and the Umoristi of Rome. He was the father of the scholar Alessandro Guarini and of Anna Guarini, one of the famous virtuose singers of the Ferrara court, the three women of the concerto di donne. She was murdered by her husband in 1598, with the assistance of her brother Girolamo.

== Work and influence ==
=== Il pastor fido ===
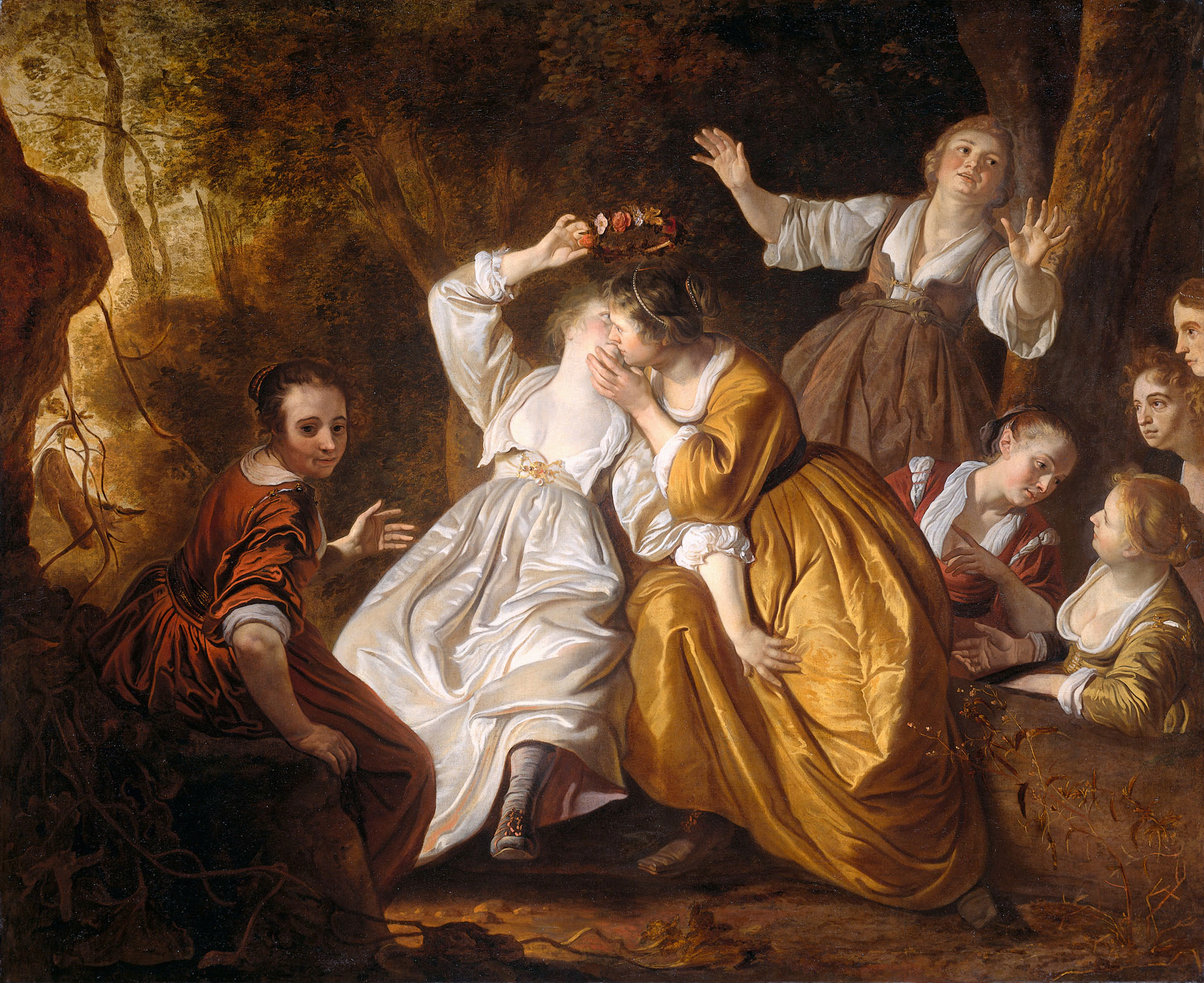
Jacob van Loo, Amarillis Crowning Mirtillo, a scene from Guarini's Pastor fido, circa 1640

His most notable work, Il pastor fido, had its first dramatic representation in honor of the nuptials of the Duke of Savoy and Catalina Michaela of Austria in 1585 (published in 1590 in Venice; 20th rev. ed., 1602, Venice; Eng. trans. The Faithful Shepherd, 1647). This play, a pastoral tragicomedy about the loves and fates of shepherds and hunters, polished in style, was translated into many languages and became popular during the 17th century. Il pastor fido marks the culmination of the pastoral poetry of the Italian Renaissance. It set the pattern for a code of refinement and gallantry that lasted until the late 18th century.

Guarini's treatises, Il Verato (1588) and Il Verato secondo (1593), written in defence of his pastoral drama and subsequently reworked in the Compendio della poesia tragicomica (1601), are interesting efforts to justify the legitimacy of the hybrid genre, tragicomedy, which he argued was more in keeping with the aspirations and tastes of the contemporary world than either comedy or tragedy alone.

=== Liric poetry ===
Guarini's lyric poems were first published in Venice by Giovanni Battista Ciotti in 1598. Guarini's lyric follows the manner of Anacreon, Stesichorus, Catullus and Petrarch as opposed to the more majestic one of Pindar, Horace and Della Casa. His madrigals are particularly remarkable for their musicality and daring metrical structure.

No poet played a larger role in the flowering of the madrigal in the late Renaissance and early Baroque eras than Guarini. His poems were set more often by madrigal composers than the work of any other poet, even Tasso, who came in a close second; the prolific madrigal composer Philippe de Monte even named one of his collections Il pastor fido after Guarini's most famous work. Nearly fifty of Monteverdi's approximately two hundred madrigals are set to texts by Guarini.

Guarini's popularity was due to his providing texts to composers which were rich with possibilities for word-painting and other easy translations of emotion into music. One of his poems, the erotic Tirsi morir volea, recounting the amorous encounter of a shepherd and a nymph, was set to music as a madrigal by more composers than any other pastoral poem of the era, including, among others, Andrea Gabrieli, Gioseppe Caimo, Carlo Gesualdo, Luca Marenzio, Benedetto Pallavicino, and Giaches de Wert. Another of Guarini's poems which was set by numerous madrigalists was Cor mio, deh non languire ("Dear heart, I prithee do not waste away").

Poetic translations of Guarini's poetic madrigals may be found in the 2018 volume by translator Nicholas R. Jones, A Poetry Precise and Free: Selected Madrigals of Guarini.

In addition to his decisive influence on madrigal composers, he was the single largest influence on opera librettists up until the time of Metastasio in the 18th century. He therefore plays an important role in the history of music.

While Guarini's work may be seen as lacking the deep feeling and sentiment of another poet at the Este court, Torquato Tasso, it was precisely this quality which commended it to musical setting at a time when excessive emotionalism had become unfashionable. An example of a setting of his work would be "O come è gran martire" from Libro Terzo dei Madrigali (1592) by Monteverdi.

=== Other works ===
Guarini's other works include a collection of Letters (1593), a dialogue on political liberty and the comedy L'Idropica (The Hydropic). Written about 1584 and published posthumously in 1613, L'Idropica had its first dramatic representation in Mantua for the 1608 wedding of Prince Francesco Gonzaga and Margherita of Savoy. The work, modeled after ancient Greek and Roman comedies, aimed to bring a sense of dignity both of a moral and artistic nature back to the genre. Guarini's play is a learned comedy in the tradition of Ariosto and Machiavelli. It is considered one of the most noteworthy examples of Late Renaissance Italian comic theatre.

== Works ==
- Delle opere del cavalier Battista Guarini (in Italian). Vol. 1. Verona: per Giovanni Alberto Timermani. 1737.
- Delle opere del cavalier Battista Guarini (in Italian). Vol. 2. Verona: per Giovanni Alberto Timermani. 1737.
- Delle opere del cavalier Battista Guarini (in Italian). Vol. 3. Verona: per Giovanni Alberto Timermani. 1738.
- Delle opere del cavalier Battista Guarini (in Italian). Vol. 4. Verona: per Giovanni Alberto Timermani. 1738.
- Nicholas R. Jones, ed. (2018). A Poetry Precise and Free: Selected Madrigals of Guarini. Ann Arbor: University of Michigan Press. ISBN 978-0472130726.
