= Musica reservata =

Musical term and performance style

Musica reservata (also musica secreta) is generally understood as a central style / way of performing music that emerged out of the late Renaissance and early Baroque period that is affiliated with being performed for private, noble audiences. As a style, it employed the use of compositional techniques often used in seconda pratica, such as chromaticism, rhythm, expressionism, etc. It was also largely influenced by the Italian madrigal and Ancient Greek music traditions, although the academies were unsure of what music in the Ancient Greek actually sounded like.

== Definition ==
Since the term's discovery at the end of the 19th century, its exact definition has been up for debate by numerous scholars, therefore leading to slightly broad/vague interpretations/explanations as there is rare original documentation/context of the term.

While some of the sources are contradictory, four aspects seem clear:

1. musica reservata involved the use of chromatic progressions and voice-leading, a manner of composing which became fashionable in the 1550s, both in madrigals and motets;
2. it involved a style of performance, perhaps with extra ornamentation or other emotive methods;
3. it used word-painting, i.e. use of specific and recognizable musical figures to illuminate specific words in the text; and
4. the music was designed to be performed by, and appreciated by, small groups of connoisseurs.

== Composers ==
Composers in the style of musica reservata included Nicola Vicentino (spelled as musica riserbata), who wrote about it in his L'antica musica ridotta alla moderna prattica (1555); Philippe de Monte, the prolific composer of madrigals who mainly worked in Vienna; and above all, Orlando di Lasso, the renowned and versatile composer working in Munich whose Prophetiae Sibyllarum, probably written in the 1560s, may represent the peak of development of the style.

== Musical characteristics ==
The style of musica reservata, with its implication of a highly refined, perhaps manneristic style of composition and performance along with a very small audience, is reminiscent both of the ars subtilior of the Avignon group of composers of the late 14th century, and also perhaps some of the contemporary avant-garde classical music of the late 20th century. The style can also be compared to the Italian composer Carlo Gesualdo's chromatic madrigals and motets a few decades later.

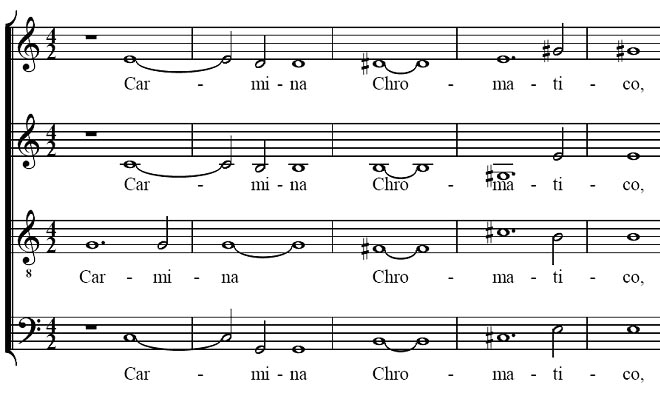
Orlando di Lasso: "Carmina Chromatico", Prophesiae Sybillarum

One of the main characteristic sounds of musica reservata is chromaticism. Composers of the style experimented with more chromatic motion and harmonies. A very well-known example of this is Orlando di Lasso's Prophetiae Sibyllarum. The chord progression which begins the Prophetiae Sibyllarum is jarring even to ears accustomed to contemporary classical music: the opening chords are C major – G major – B major – C♯ minor – E major – F♯ minor, all in root position, sung to the text: Carmina chromatico, quae audis modulata tenore – literally "songs, which you hear rendered by a chromatic tenor" (maybe with reference to all-chromatic composition which 'technically' based on a chromatic tenor). The Prophetiae Sibyllarum at large is a collection of 12 motets, each steeped in heavy chromaticism.

In the style of musica reservata much attention was paid to the text especially in how it related to the music. This attention to matching the text with the music is known as word painting. Lasso's Penitential Psalm is a well documented example of word painting. In the Penitential Psalms Lasso matches the music with the text using more reserved writing while setting the more reserved text

== Lasso's Penitential Psalms ==
The Penitential Psalms (1584) is a collection of works that had individual musical settings for each of the seven penitential psalms (Psalms 6, 32, 38, 51, 102, 130, and 143). It is one of the best representatives of musica reservata because of the heavy emphasis on text expression.

"Lasso expressed these psalms so appropriately in accommodating, according to necessity, thought and words with lamenting and plaintier tones, in expressing the force of the individual affections, and in placing the object almost alive before the eyes...".

Quickelberg has also been reported saying that Lasso had mastered the style of musica reservata. Throughout his other compositions, he worked with non-biblical texts as well as biblical, which highlights the musical separation from the church during this era.

Another example of chromaticism can be found in Nicola Vicentino's L'aura Che 'l Verde Lauro et l'aureo Crine.

== Changes from the Renaissance ==
One of the biggest changes from the Renaissance to the Baroque era of music was the thought behind the lyrics of the music being created. During the Renaissance, more emphasis was put on the structure of the music and the movement of the lyrical lines. As musica reservata emerged in the late Renaissance as a genre of music, the compositional techniques of word-painting and expressionism in lyricism started gaining popularity and substance, leading to substantial changes in popular music for the time. Word painting and expressionism are two of the leading characteristics of the early Baroque period of music, and musica reservata helped usher in those compositional changes.

== Martin Luther's influence ==
Martin Luther had a substantial influence on musica reservata, and its popularity. As an important historical figure in the Protestant reformation, Martin Luther was an advocate for music education, and believed in many of the musical ideas that define musica reservata as a genre, such as the influential power of music and the significance of Ancient Greek music traditions. Martin Luther wanted music used in the church to possess gifts of god, to be spontaneous, and influence listeners to behave in the ethical manners desired by the church. Luther commonly performed and listened to musica reservata in his personal home, and encouraged its use in the church, although it did not get widespread use.

== Humanism ==
Humanism started in Italy in the 14th century and later spread throughout Europe during the Renaissance. It was an intellectual movement that emphasized Greek & Roman texts, individuality, and human potential. The majority of interest shifted from the church to topics relating to arts, science, human expression, human achievements, human nature, and philosophy. This shift influenced all aspects of renaissance culture including art, music, literature, and politics.

Humanism influenced music due to the search for elegance and clarity of musical style and form . This resulted in a heavier emphasis on the text and emotional expression. Music from the musica reservata style is heavily emotional. Vocal pieces in particular were emphasizing text painting as a way to lean into human expression.

== Music secreta ==
Musica secreta is a similar concept to musica reservata, since the performances were private and meant for a certain audience. These performances were quite rare, and there are very few records of them. The repertoire performed was also considered "the rarest music" involving the most excellent instrumentalists and vocalists. The commonality between the two concepts is that they were both designated for wealthy groups such as noblemen. They were a rare occurrence and unopened to the public, making them a coveted occasion.
