= Luzzasco Luzzaschi =

Italian composer (1545–1607)

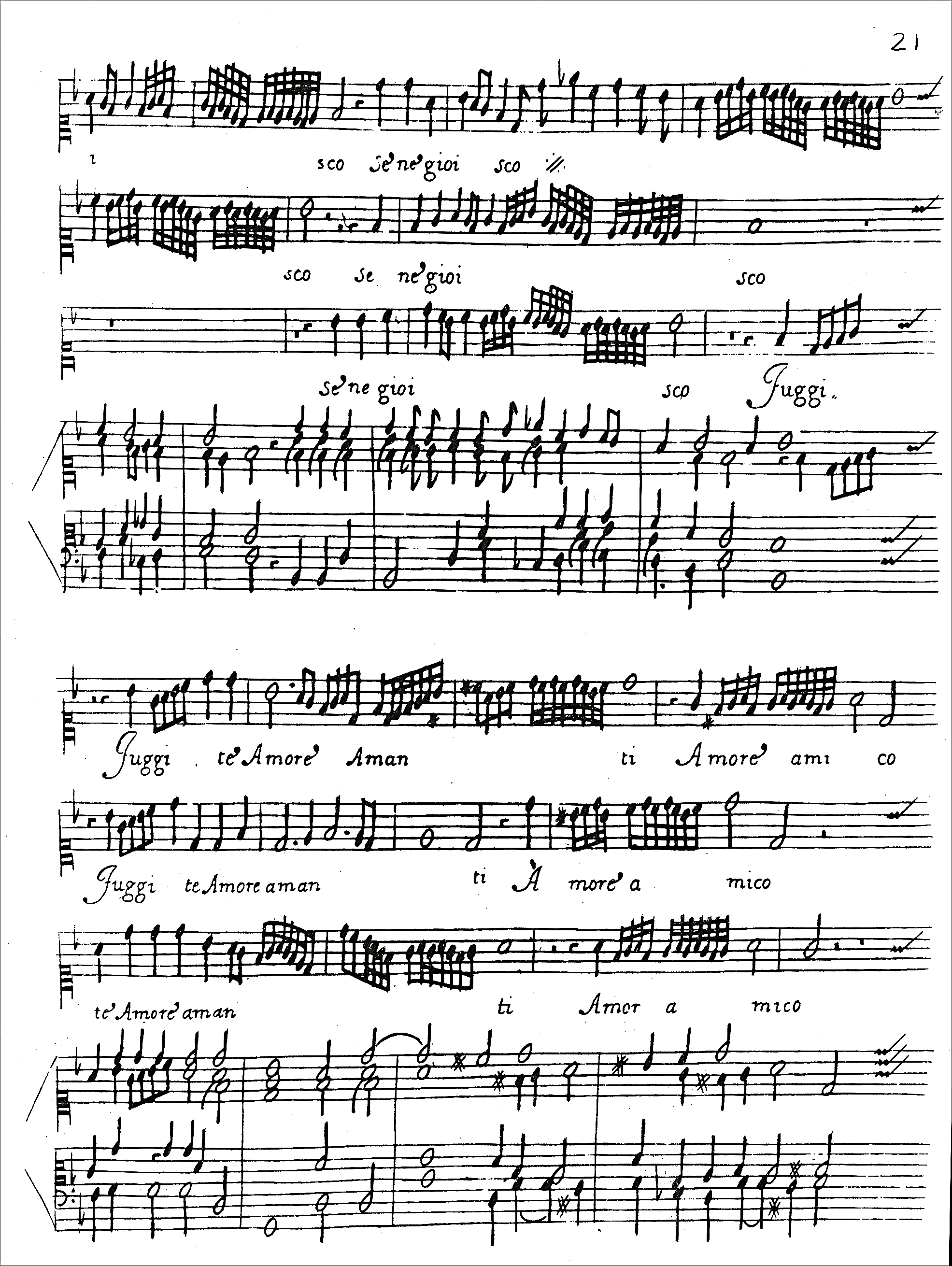
The second page of Luzzaschi's "O dolcezz'amarissime" from the 1601 publication Madrigali a uno, e'doi, e'tre soprani

Luzzasco Luzzaschi (c. 1545 – 10 September 1607) was an Italian composer, organist, and teacher of the late Renaissance. He was born and died in Ferrara, and despite evidence of travels to Rome it is assumed that Luzzaschi spent the majority of his life in his native city. He was a skilled representative of the late Italian madrigal style, along with Palestrina, Wert, Monte, Lassus, Marenzio, Gesualdo and others.

== Biography ==
As a pupil of Cipriano de Rore, Luzzaschi developed his craft and eventually came to be an influential pedagogue himself. Anthony Newcomb writes:

The members of the Roman school, beginning with Ercole Pasquini and succeeded by Frescobaldi himself, were entirely trained by Luzzaschi. The neapolitians around Gesualdo and Macque admired and closely followed Luzzaschi’s work; some came north to study with Luzzaschi personally.”

In 1564, Luzzaschi was appointed as principal organist to the d'Este court. His facility as a keyboard player must have been paramount, for his competence on Nicola Vicentino's microtonal archicembalo was actively documented throughout his career. Luzzaschi was highly respected by his peers, both as a keyboard player and as a composer. Vincenzo Galilei called him one of the best musicians in Italy, and Banchieri named him one of the top two organists (along with Merulo).

Luzzaschi is widely remembered due to his association with the famous Concerto delle donne, a private female vocal ensemble founded by Alfonso II, Duke of Ferrara. In addition to his duties as court organist, as director for the ensemble he composed expert madrigals that required virtuosic vocal skill and advanced musicianship. Expressing a highly ornamented soprano line, his famous publication, Madrigali...per cantare, et sonare, a uno, e doi, e tre soprani of 1601 contained repertory performed by this expert troupe.

== Works ==
Luzzaschi's surviving canon is limited to: seven books (1571 through 1604) of madrigals for five voices; the 1601 Madrigali per cantare et sonare a 1-3 soprani; a collection of five-part motets; and four keyboard works. While reference to three books of four-voice ricercars by Luzzaschi indicates that he was actively composing instrumental work, the books themselves appear to be lost. A number of madrigal prints were dedicated to Lucrezia d'Este around 1570, including Luzzaschi's First Book. In his two madrigal books from the 1570s, Luzzaschi often set texts in the form Don Harrán has describer as the "ballata madrigal". In Luzzaschi's earliest madrigals, melodies are either awkward in character or narrower in range with frequent use of repeated notes, and in both types the text is usually set syllabically. In the later madrigals, the first type has evolved into a longer more graceful, lyrical melody with an increased use of melisma, while the other type has developed into a more confined and repetitive declaratory line that is sometimes recitative-like.

- Il primo libro de madrigali a cinque voci (Ferrara, 1571)
- Secondo libro de madrigali a cinque voci (Venice, 1576)

=== Luzzaschi's influence on other composers ===
Luzzasco Luzzaschi had a profound impact on several composers of his time and beyond, particularly through his expressive madrigal style and innovative keyboard techniques. Three Italians, Giovanni Gabrieli, Marenzio, and Monteverdi, may be seen as strongly affecting his style. Carlo Gesualdo's madrigals reflect Luzzaschi's hallmark features: expressive chromaticism, intricate dissonance, and emotionally charged vocal writing. Claudo Monteverdi was also influenced by Luzzaschi, particularly in his early madrigals.

== Sources ==
- Gustave Reese, Music in the Renaissance. New York, W.W. Norton & Co., 1954. ISBN 0-393-09530-4
- The Concise Edition of Baker's Biographical Dictionary of Musicians, 8th ed. Revised by Nicolas Slonimsky. New York, Schirmer Books, 1993. ISBN 0-02-872416-X
