= Alfonso II d'Este =

Duke of Ferrara from 1559 to 1597

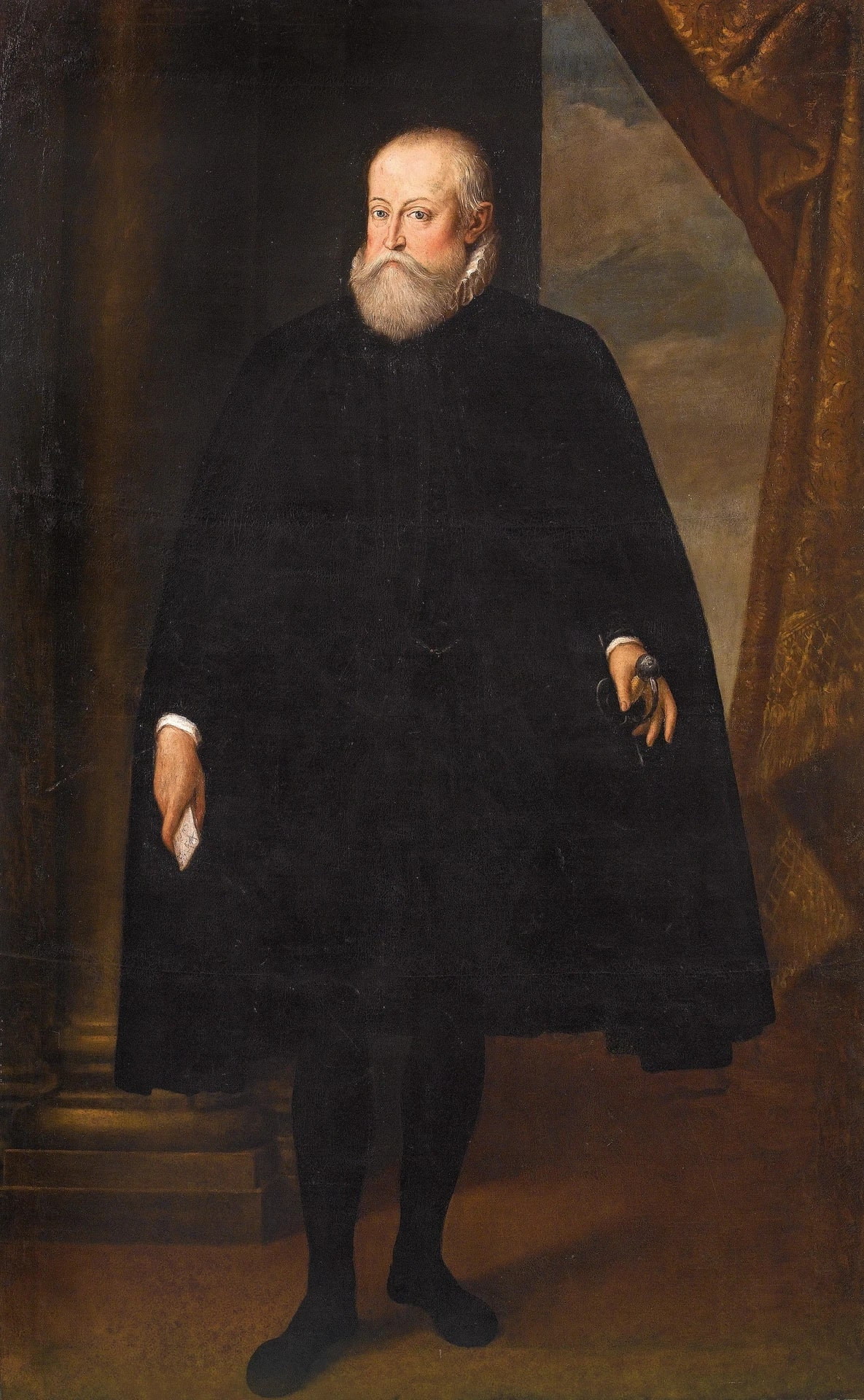
- Painting of Alfonso II d'Este from the studio of Cesare Aretusi

Duke of Ferrara
- Reign: 3 October 1559 – 27 October 1597
- Predecessor: Ercole II
- Successor: Lost to the Papal States (1597)

Duke of Modena and Reggio
- Reign: 3 October 1559 – 27 October 1597
- Predecessor: Ercole II
- Successor: Cesare

Duke of Chartres
- Tenure: 12 June 1574 – 27 October 1597
- Predecessor: Renée
- Successor: Gaston
- Born: 22 November 1533
- Died: 27 October 1597 (aged 63); Ferrara
- Spouse: Lucrezia di Cosimo de' Medici (m. 1558; died 1561) Barbara of Austria (m. 1565; died 1572) Margherita Gonzaga (m. 1579)
- House: Este
- Father: Ercole II d'Este
- Mother: Renée of France
- Religion: Roman Catholicism

Alfonso II d'Este (22 November 1533 – 27 October 1597) was Duke of Ferrara from 1559 to 1597. He was a member of the House of Este.

== Biography ==
Alfonso was the elder son of Ercole II d'Este and Renée de France, the daughter of Louis XII of France and Anne of Brittany, and was the fifth and last Duke of Ferrara. As a young man, Alfonso fought in the service of Henry II of France against the Habsburgs. Soon after his accession, he was forced by Pope Pius IV to send his mother back to France due to her increasingly Calvinist beliefs. The 1570 Ferrara earthquake occurred during his reign. In 1583, he allied with Emperor Rudolf II in the war against the Turks in Hungary.

The court of Alfonso was a centre for the development of secular music, both in Italy and Europe at large. He assembled the concerto delle donne, a chorus of women performing for the entertainment of Alfonso and his court.

== Marriages ==
Alfonso married three times:

- On 3 July 1558, Alfonso married his first wife Lucrezia di Cosimo de' Medici, a daughter of Cosimo I de' Medici, Grand Duke of Tuscany and Eleonora di Toledo. She died two years afterwards, at just 16. Poisoning at the hands of the Duke has been suspected; however, pulmonary tuberculosis is the more widely accepted cause of death.
- On 5 December 1565, Alfonso married his second wife Barbara of Austria, eighth daughter of Ferdinand I, Holy Roman Emperor and Anna of Bohemia and Hungary. She died of tuberculosis in 1572.
- On 24 February 1579, Alfonso married his third wife, Margherita Gonzaga. She was the eldest daughter of William I, Duke of Mantua and Eleonora of Austria. Margherita was the niece of his second wife, Barbara.

He had no known children.

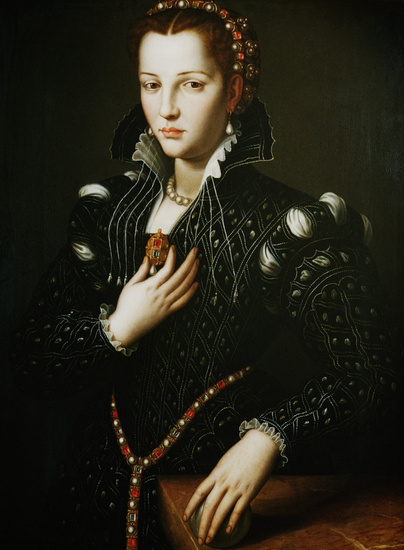
Lucrezia di Cosimo de' Medici

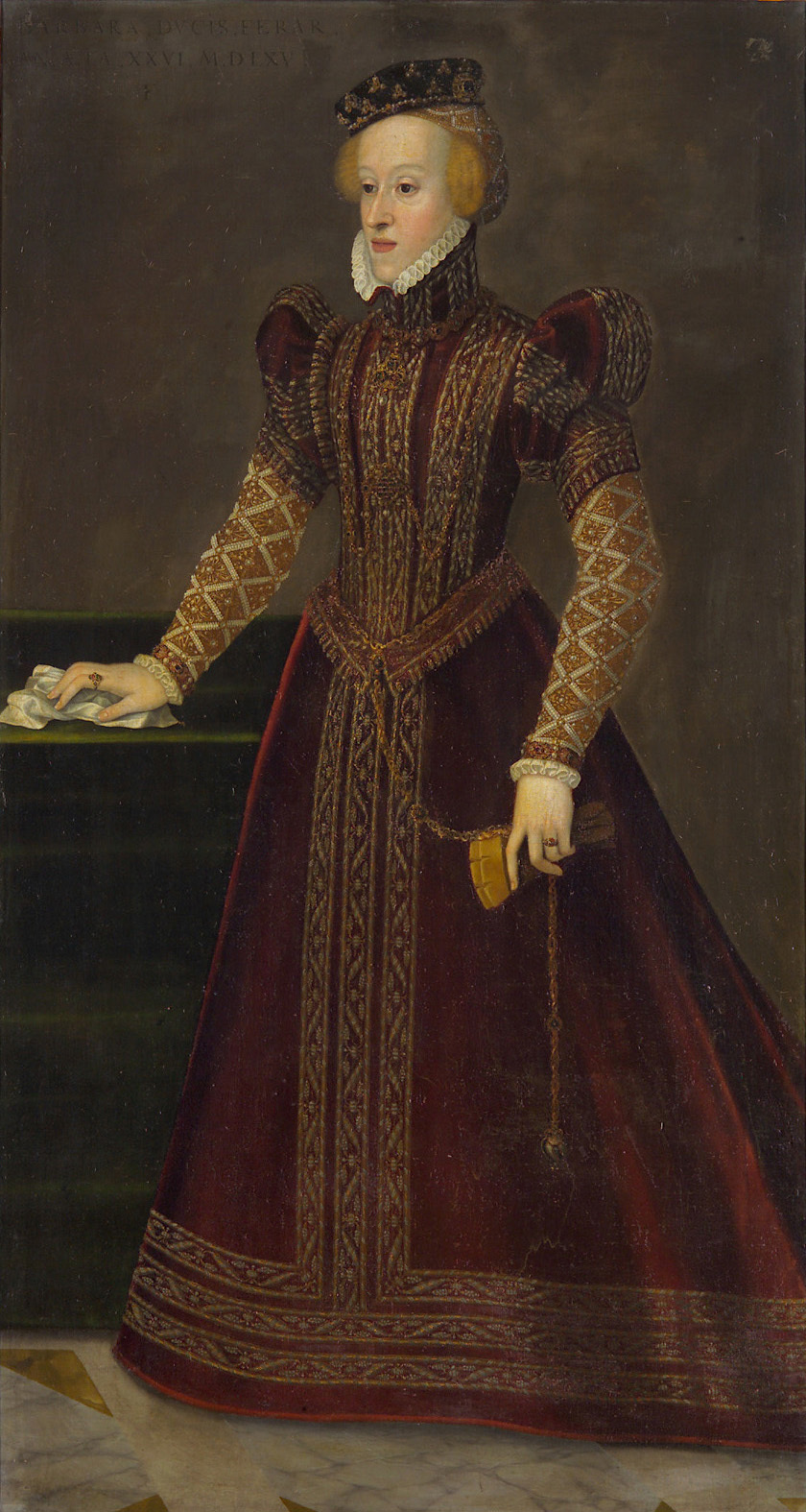
Barbara of Austria

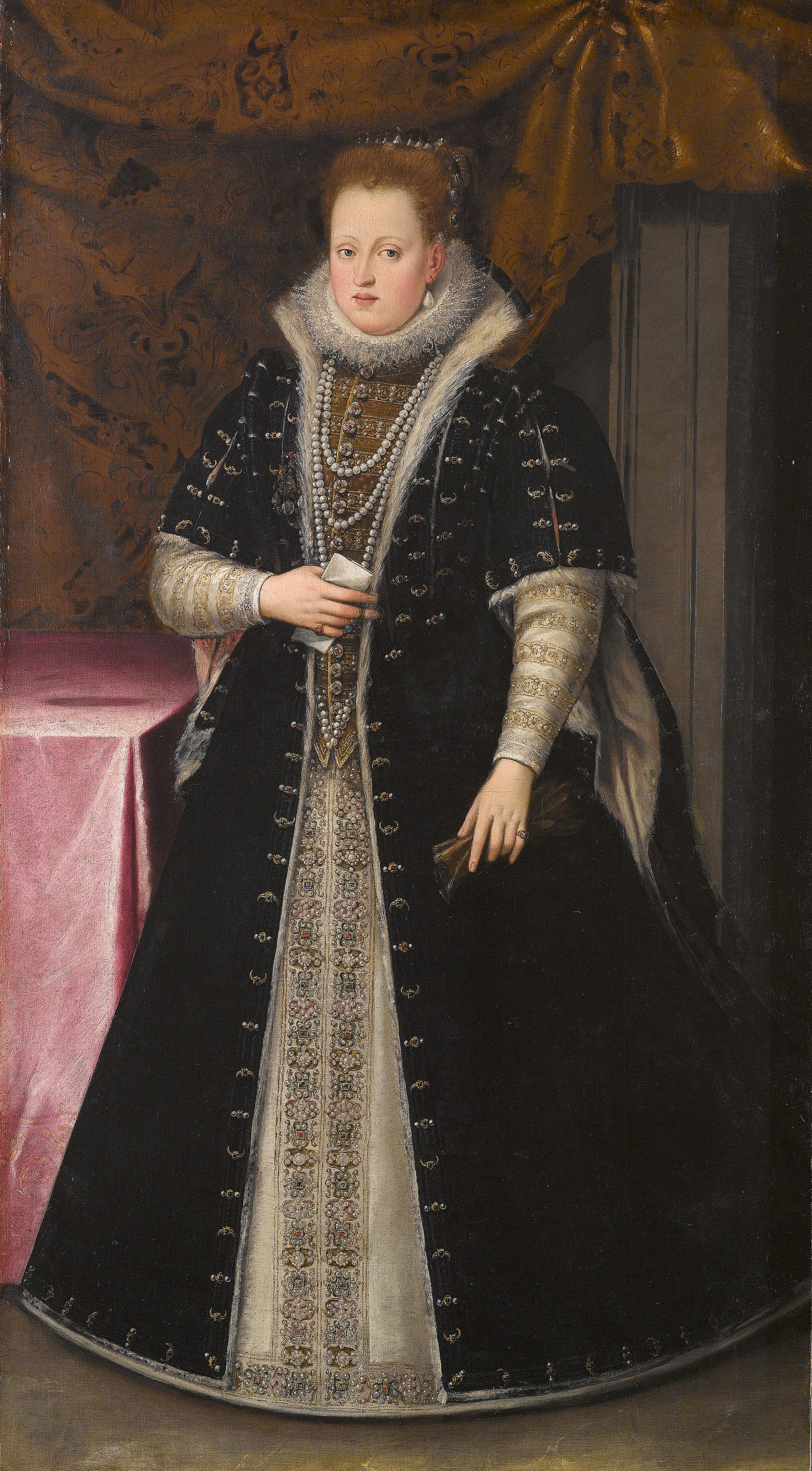
Margherita Gonzaga

== Succession ==
The legitimate line of the House of Este ended in 1597 with him. Emperor Rudolf II recognised as heir his cousin Cesare d'Este, member of a cadet branch, who continued to rule in the imperial duchies and carried on the family name. The succession as duke of Este, however, was recognised only by the emperor but not by the popes. In 1598, Ferrara was therefore incorporated into the Papal States by Pope Clement VIII, on grounds of doubtful legitimacy. As a result of Alfonso's death, Cesare d'Este and his family were "obliged to leave the city", and the power of the government was there after turned over to the cardinal legate.

== Patron of the arts and sciences ==
Alfonso II raised the glory of Ferrara to its highest point, and was the patron of Torquato Tasso, Giovanni Battista Guarini, and Cesare Cremonini—favouring the arts and sciences, as the princes of his house had always done. Besides being fluent in Italian, he was also proficient in Latin and French. Luzzasco Luzzaschi served as his court organist.

In addition, he was the sponsor of the Concerto delle donne, a type of group which was to be copied all over Italy. He also restored the Castello Estense, damaged by an earthquake in 1570.

His expenses, however, caused damage to the public treasury.

== In literature ==
Alfonso II is the duke upon whom Robert Browning based his poem My Last Duchess, and is a major character in the Maggie O'Farrell novel The Marriage Portrait.

== Sources ==
- Bartlett, Kenneth R. (2013). A Short History of the Italian Renaissance. University of Toronto Press. ISBN 978-1-4426-0014-0.
- Bartlett, Kenneth (2019). The Renaissance in Italy: A History. Hackett Publishing Company.
- Murphy, Caroline P. (2008). Murder of a Medici Princess. Oxford University Press. ISBN 978-0-19-531439-7.
- Previté-Orton, C. W. (1978). Cambridge Medieval History, Shorter: Volume 2, The Twelfth Century to the Renaissance. Cambridge University Press.

Alfonso II d'Este House of Este Born: 22 November 1533 Died: 27 October 1597
Preceded by Ercole II	Duke of Modena and Reggio; 1559–1597	Succeeded by Cesare
Preceded by Ercole II	Duke of Ferrara; 1559–1597	Seized by the Papal States
Preceded by Renée	Duke of Chartres; 1574–1597	Vacant Crown lands of France Title next held by Gaston
