= Denis Henrion =

French mathematician

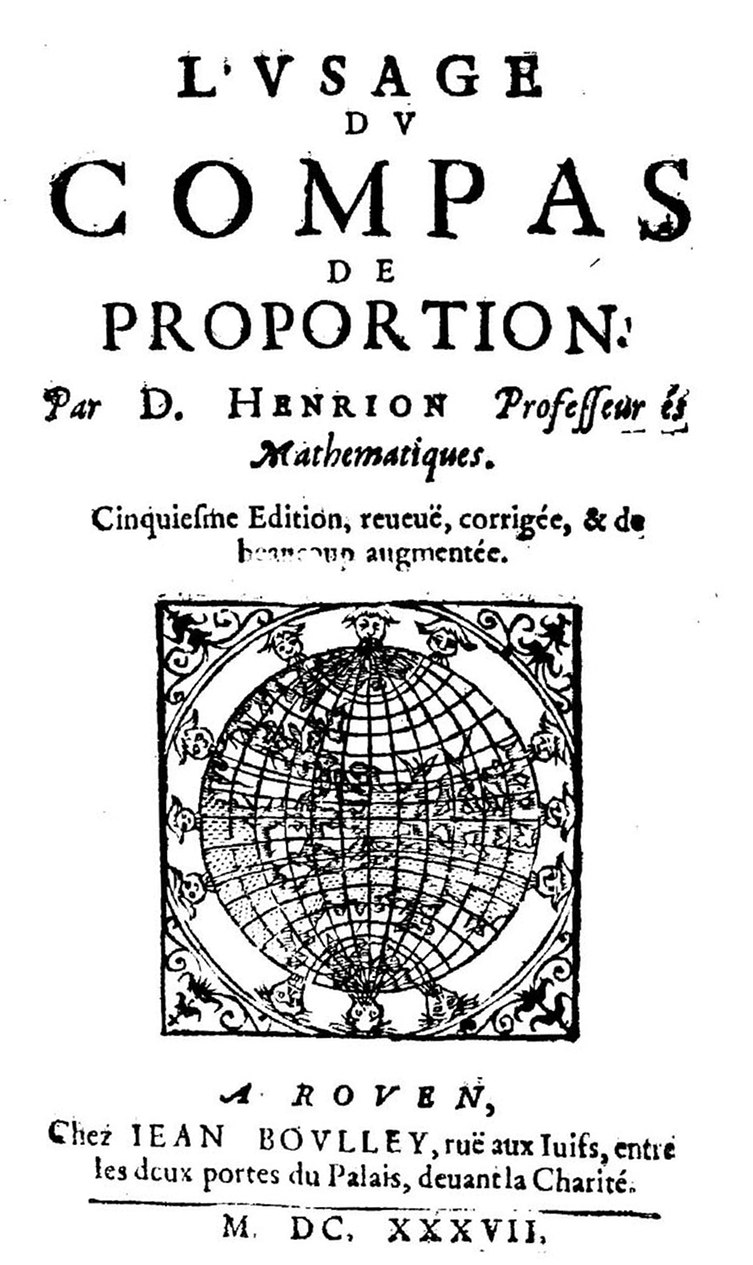
Usage du compas de proportion, 1637

Denis (sometimes Didier) Henrion, was a French mathematician born at the end of the 16th century in France. He co-edited the works of Viète. He died around 1632 in Paris.

== Contributions ==
Henrion wrote a tract concerning logarithms.

He translated Euclid's Elements from Latin into French.

He published Problemata nobilissima duo (Paris, 1616), a book against Marin Ghetaldi and attacking Viète and Regiomontanus. Later reorganized, the book was republished by its author.

== Works (selection) ==
=== Original works ===
- Mémoires mathématiques recueillis et dressés en faveur de la noblesse française. Paris, 1613, 4°. Published again in Paris by Fleury Bourriquant, 1623, 8°
- Problemata duo nobilissima, quorum nec analysin geometricam, videntur tenuisse Ioannes Regiomontanus & Petrus Nonius; nec demonstrationem satis accuratam repraesentasse, Franciscus Vieta et Marinus Ghetaldus nunc demum a Clemente Cyriaco diligentius elaborata et novis analyseon formis exculta. Inscriptiones praeterea figurarum non injucundœ. Paris: David Leclerc, 1616, 4°. (Internet Archive link)
- Problematum opus amplissimum et schediasmata poetica et critica (manuscript)
- Deux cens questions ingénieuses et récréatives extraictes et tirées des œuvres mathématiques de Valentin Menher avec quelques annotations de Michel Coignet, le tout corrigé, recueilli et mis en cet ordre, par D.H.P.E.M. Paris, 1620
- L'usage du mécomètre, qui est un instrument géométrique avec lequel on peut très facilement mesurer toutes sortes de longueurs et distances visibles. Paris, 1630, 8°

=== Translations ===
- Les Quinze livres des Éléments d'Euclide, traduits du latin en français. Online: Tables des directions et projections de Jean de Mont-Royal

== See also ==
- Alexander Anderson
- Marin Getaldić
- Pierre Hérigone
- Clément Cyriaque de Mangin (who sometimes used 'Denis Henrion' as a pseudonym)
- Claude Mydorge
