= Deans Court =

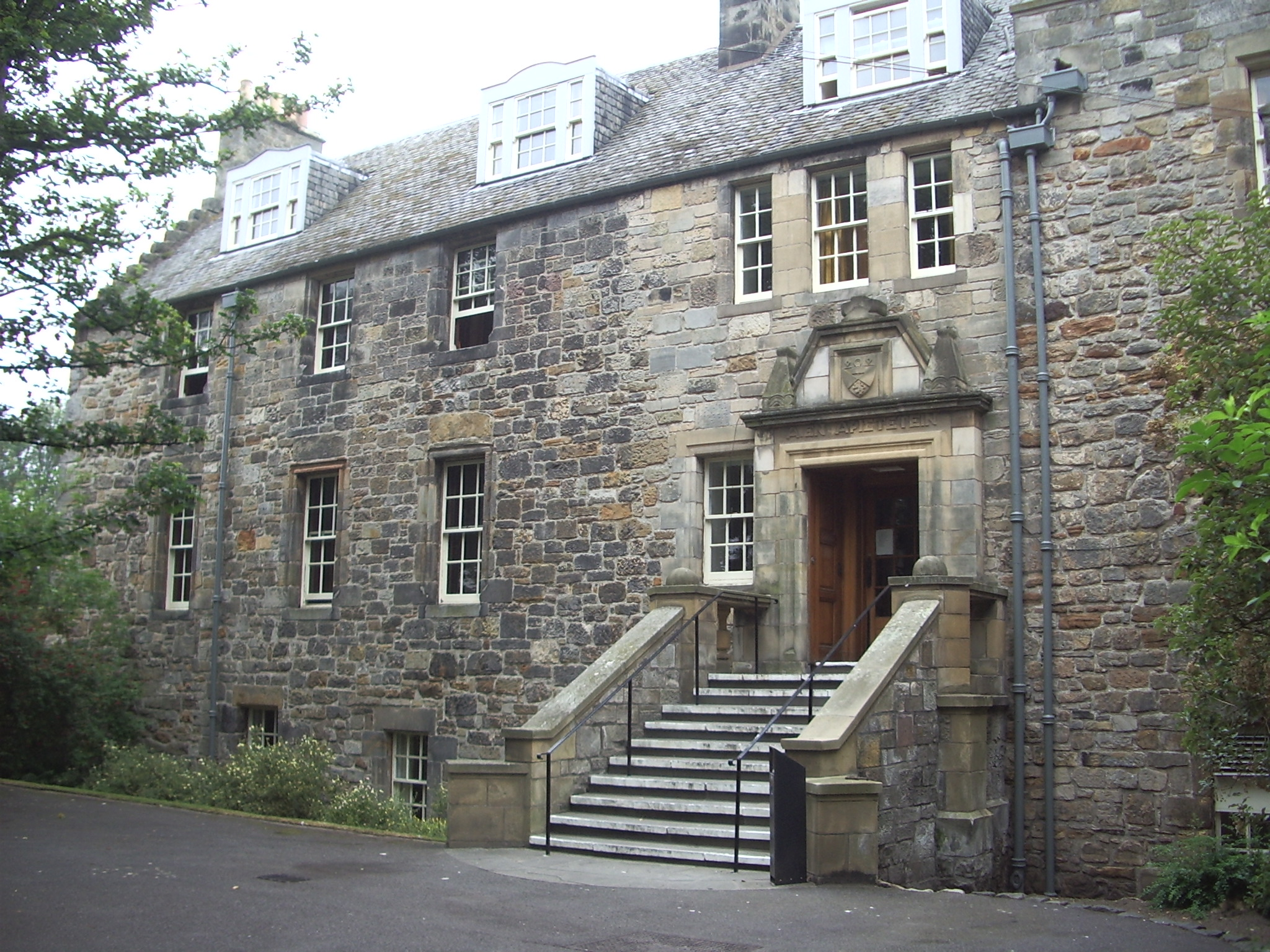
- The main entrance of Deans Court
- Interactive map of the Deans Court area

General information
- Type: Student residence
- Architectural style: Scottish Vernacular
- Location: North Street; St Andrews; Fife; KY16 9QT, St Andrews, Fife, Scotland, United Kingdom
- Coordinates: 56.3403°N 2.7893°W
- Completed: c. 12th century
- Renovated: c. 16th century 1951; 1975
- Owner: University of St Andrews

Website
- Deans Court

Deans Court is a student hall of residence at the University of St Andrews originating from the 12th century, thus, arguably, the oldest dwelling house in the town of St Andrews, Scotland. It stands at the east-end of St Andrews, where North street and South street converge. The entrance of the courtyard opens up to the ancient, ruined, St Andrews cathedral. The Hall is open exclusively to postgraduates, and comprises the main building and four annexes, two on North Street, two on South Street. Current residents are affectionately known as Deans Courtiers, Deans Courtesans, or Deans Beans.

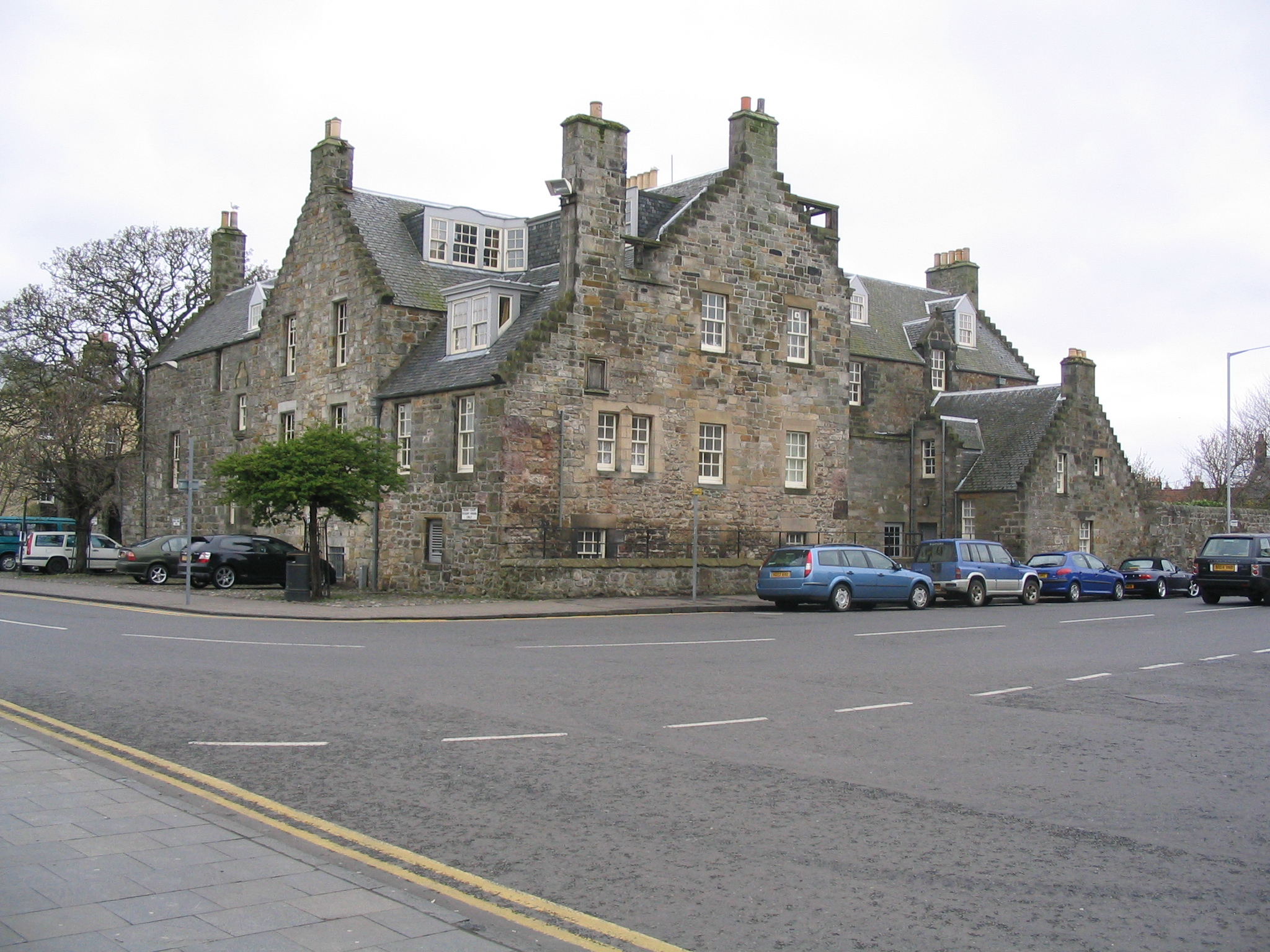
Deans Court as seen from North Street

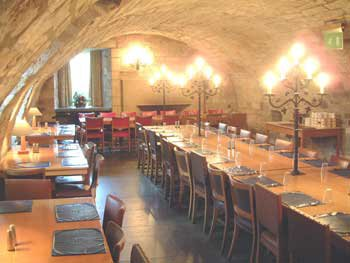
The vaulted dining room

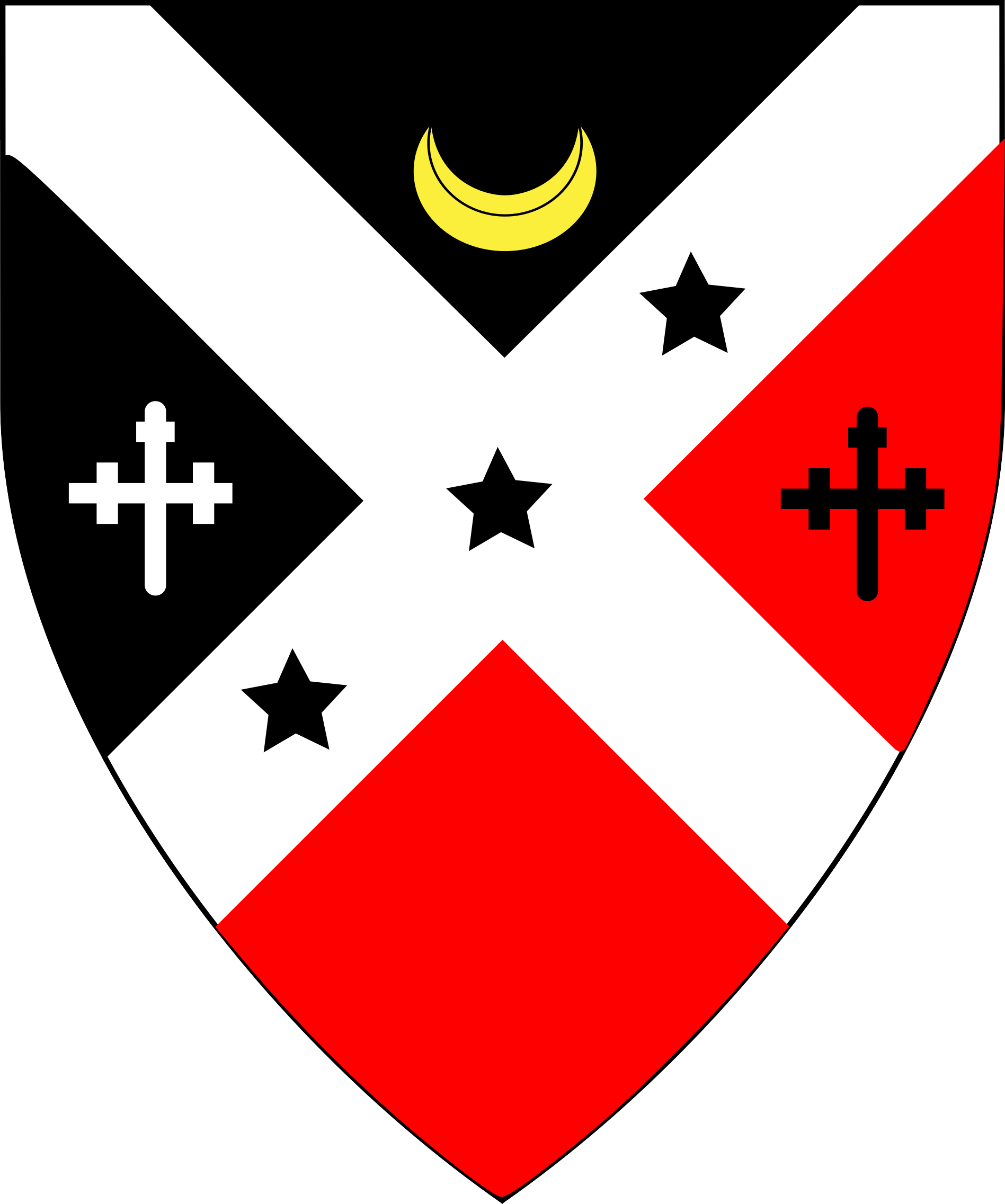
The shield of Deans Court hall of residence.

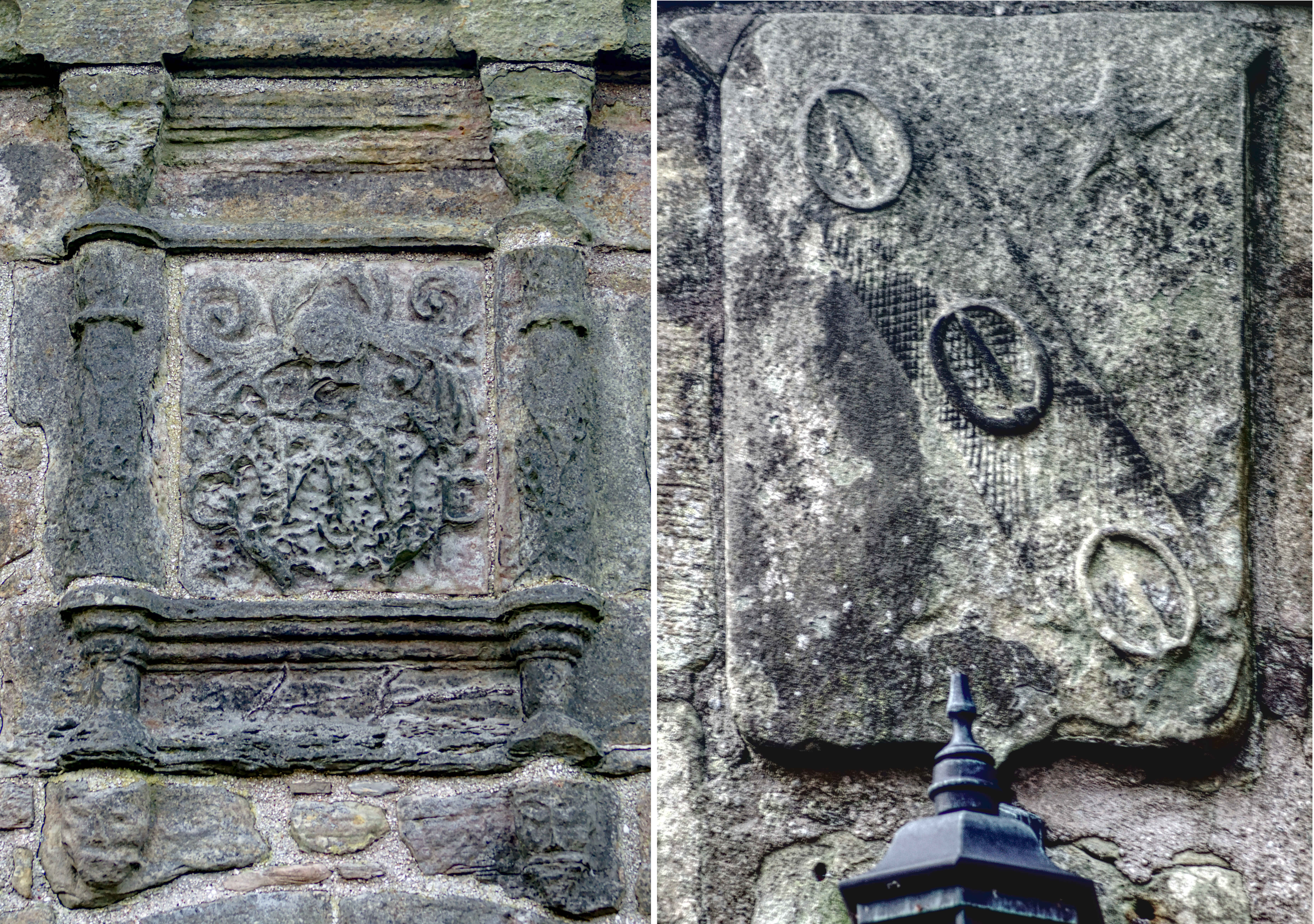
Two coats of arms that can be found around Deans Court. On the left is that of George Douglas above the main gate, on the right that of the Stirling family above the entrance to the garden.

== History ==
The main building of Deans Court has its origins in the twelfth century, when its vaulted core served as a section of the Archdeacon's manse. Today, the vault is used as the dining hall. A small armorial plaque, moved from its original site, bears the arms of James Haldenstone, Prior from 1418 to 1443. Although most Priory lands were seized during the Reformation, Deans Court was saved by Sir George Douglas, an elder of the Parish Church who had helped Mary, Queen of Scots, escape from imprisonment at Loch Leven. Douglas remodelled Deans Court around 1585, adding a round-arched foot-gate in the courtyard above which his coat of arms can still be seen (though severely weathered) and possibly extending the property to the west. Stones from the ruined cathedral were used as a source of building material.

In the 17th century, at least a section of the building was home to the Scottish astronomer and mathematician James Gregory, who was Professor of Mathematics at the University from 1668 to 1674. The building was Victorianized in 1876 and became home to the Stirling family, whose coat of arms can still be seen above the archway to the inner garden. The building served as an annexe of St Leonards School for several years until 1930, when the property was acquired for the University by Sir James Irvine, and was heavily renovated over the subsequent two decades with funds received from ICI and The Carnegie Trust. Irvine's vision for the hall being one where "guests would be brought to dine and conversation would flourish: a fertile environment for a cross-disciplinary community of scholars". It was re-opened as a postgraduate hall of residence in 1951, and is now home to some 54 postgraduate students. The University's coat of arms can be seen over the main door way, along with the University's motto, ΑΙΕΝ ΑΡΙΣΤΕΥΕΙΝ (Greek: Ever To Excel). Over the doorway of the dining hall the beginning of the University of St Andrews Latin Blessing is carved in stone: Sit Nomen Domini Benedictum (Blessed be the name of the Lord).

In the courtyard, there is a ‘mysterious’ stone. Many experts from the University have examined it, and the most likely theory, though not certain, is that it is a Bronze-Age cist slab. It has been in courtyard since at least 1854, as demonstrated by its presence on an Ordnance Survey town plan from that year, but is it not known where it came from before that. It is said that current plans from the University are to relocate it to the garden at the Museum of The University of St Andrews, despite residents' disappointment in potentially seeing this artefact being removed from its original bicentenary location, without even being protected from atmospheric agents.

== Facilities ==
A plaque that sits atop one of the doorways leading from the lobby detailing when Deans Court was opened as a postgraduate residence, with thanks to those who funded renovations.

Deans Court comprises three buildings:

The Main Building, which contains 21 rooms. This is the oldest residential building in St Andrews. All Deans Court students can access this building. As well as bedrooms, bathrooms and four student kitchens, this building also contains the Common Room, two libraries, the dining room and the House Manager’s Office.

The North Street annexe, made up of 3 North Street and 11 North Street. The former contains 6 rooms and the latter 8. Each house has its own kitchen and bathrooms.

The South Street annexe (3-5 South Street), made up of 20 rooms, bathrooms and two kitchens. This can be accessed via South Street itself but also through the Main Building Garden.

In addition to the heritage listed buildings, Deans Court also has a large main garden, accessible via the courtyard, and a small vegetable garden tucked away on one side. The latter is tended by the residents with advice from the University's Edible Campus and Transition teams. The vegetable garden is accessible by the community, and is an opportunity for the residents to grow their own fruit and vegetables.

== Traditions ==
The Crichton Cup

At the end of each academic year residents engage in the Crichton Cup (a golf tournament named after The Admirable Crichton). This tournament has been run in the garden for 50 years. The course follows the landscape of the garden, with the holes demarcated by the trees. A plaque displaying the course is in the common room, and each year the person with the best score overall and the best score for the Long Hole is recorded. In 2017, the safety aspects of the game were called into question when one stray ball found its way into the dining hall after smashing through the window. It is now recommended that residents remember to board the windows before the competition begins. This infamous ball now resides in the common room in a display case, as a memento and source of inspiration for students to come.

Croquet

Croquet is a long-standing tradition within Deans Court. It has been played as long as anyone can remember. Whenever it is sunny, students can often be found playing in the garden with the Deans Court croquet set. It is not uncommon for residents whose occupation has spanned a few years to teach the game to new residents.

Bobby Jones Fellowship and Scholarships

Since 1976, five students from the Emory University who have excelled academically are awarded one year of graduate study at the University of St Andrews, and Deans Court has long been their accommodation during their stay. This programme has been offered to honour the late Robert T. Jones, Jr., an internationally renowned golfer and Emory alumnus.

Bobbys (as they are known) are also given the opportunity to drive whilst in St Andrews, and the 'Bobby Mobile' is the only student vehicle allowed to be parked in the Deans Court Courtyard.

Formal dinners

Four times per year (twice a semester), black-tie formal dinners are held in the dining room. This is preceded by a drinks reception in the Common Room. Guest speakers, often illustrious members of the town and university, are invited to address the residents. This is also an opportunity for the residents to showcase their talents, and it is not uncommon for pre- or post-dinner entertainment to occur. Even more illustrious performances have been given, including one from world-famous KT Tunstall.

It is traditional for formal student dinners in the University of St Andrews to begin with the University's Latin Blessing: Sit nomen Domini benedictum per Jesum Christum Salvatorem Nostrum. Amen. (Blessed be the name of the Lord through Jesus Christ our Saviour. Amen.) and with the Latin Grace: Gloria Patri Filio Sprituique Sancto in saecula saeculorum. Amen. (Glory be to the Father, the Son, and the Holy Spirit. World Without End. Amen.) When the meal is finished, the dinner concludes with Deo Gratias (Thanks be to God).

Semi-formal Friday

Semi-formal Friday is a new tradition which gives residents the opportunity to use their postgraduate gowns. These differ from the red undergraduate gown of the University and are black with burgundy front folds. Residents dress smart for weekly Friday dinner to which they can bring wine.

Garden parties

The Welcome BBQ in September is one of the first social events of the year used to welcome new students. Immediately, residents are invited to partake in traditions such as croquet to bring together residents old and new. Throughout the year, residents take advantage of the Deans Court gardens with various events accompanied by drinks, music, and games. However, in recent years (likely due to the unpredictable weather in St Andrews) a pizza party has been held indoors.

The main garden is also a popular location for Deans Court alumni to hold weddings and wedding photo-shoots. Many couples meet over the dining table in the 900 year-old dining room, and return to take their vows at the same location.

== Alumni Activity ==
Through the years there have been a few alumni groups associated with Deans Court. In more recent years, these have mostly been focused on particular year groups. As of 2019, however, a new Deans Court Alumni Association was founded by the residents, with the aim of fostering the friendships developed between the residents of each year, in addition to developing the inter-year network, and charting the history and experiences of the residents.

The Deans Court Alumni Association is affiliated with the University of St Andrews, and was received with great enthusiasm, both from the younger and older generations of Deans Court alumni. They have a Facebook page as well as their own website.

Current and past residents are also encouraged to keep up-to-date via the hall Instagram Account .
