= Targioni Tozzetti =

Targioni Tozzetti (pronounced [tarˈdʒoːni totˈtsetti]) is an Italian surname. Notable people with the surname include:

- Adolfo Targioni Tozzetti (1823–1902), Italian entomologist
- Giovanni Targioni Tozzetti (1712–1783), Italian naturalist
- Giovanni Targioni-Tozzetti (1863–1934), Italian librettist

== See also ==
- Targioni
- Tozzettia
