= Adriaan van Roomen =

Belgian mathematician (1561–1615)

Adriaan van Roomen (29 September 1561 – 4 May 1615), also known as Adrianus Romanus, was a mathematician, professor of medicine and medical astrologer from the Duchy of Brabant in the Habsburg Netherlands who was active throughout Central Europe in the late 16th and early 17th centuries. As a mathematician he worked in algebra, trigonometry and geometry; and on the decimal expansion of pi. He solved the Problem of Apollonius using a new method that involved intersecting hyperbolas. He also wrote on the Gregorian calendar reform.

== Life ==
Van Roomen was born in Leuven, the son of Adriaan Van Roomen and Maria Van Den Daele. He was educated partly in Leuven and partly After studying at the Jesuit College in Cologne, also attending the University of Cologne where he began his study of medicine. He also briefly studied medicine at Leuven University. Roomen was professor of mathematics and medicine at Louvain from 1586 to 1592. He met Kepler, and discussed with François Viète two questions about equations and tangencies. He then spent some time in Italy, particularly with Clavius in Rome in 1585. His publication of 1595, Parvum theatrum urbium, contained Latin verse on the cities of Italy (possibly written by Thomas Edwards).

In June 1593 Van Roomen became the inaugural professor of medicine at the newly refounded University of Würzburg. He was also appointed physician in ordinary to the court of Rudolf II. From around 1595 to 1603 he produced calendars, almanacs and prognostications published under the patronage of Julius Echter, prince-bishop of Würzburg. At the same time, he served as mathematician of the king of Poland and become famous for the computation of the value of pi to sixteen decimals, surpassing François Viète who had arrived at ten digits. After being widowed he was ordained to the priesthood in 1604 and on 8 October 1608 was installed as a canon of the collegiate church of St John the Evangelist in Würzburg.

His Mathesis Polemica, published in Frankfurt in 1605, explained the military applications of mathematics. In June 1610 he was in Prague, after which he travelled to Poland at the invitation of Jan Zamoyski to give public lectures on mathematics at Zamość in Red Ruthenia. He made the return journey via Hungary, arriving back in Würzburg at the end of 1611.

Struggling with health problems, Van Roomen undertook a journey to Spa to take the waters but died en route at Mainz in the arms of his son, who was travelling with him.

== See also ==
- The Adriaan van Roomen affair
- Zamojski Academy

== Works ==
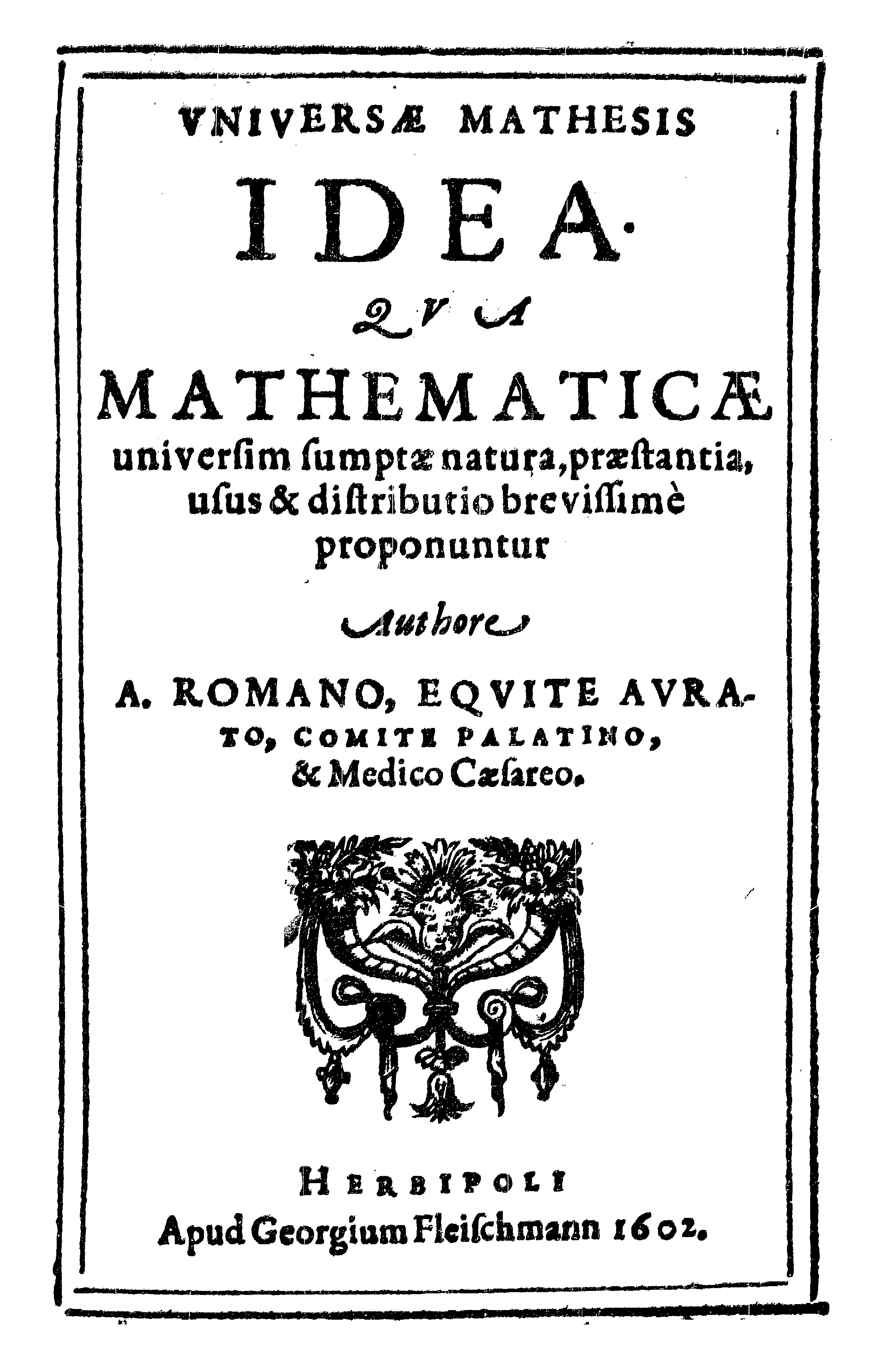
Universae mathesis idea, 1602

- Ouranographia sive caeli descriptio (Leuven, Joannes Masius, 1591)
- Ideae mathematicae pars prima, sive methodus polygonorum (Antwerp, Jan van Keerbergen, 1593)
- Canon triangulorum rectangulorum, tam sphaericorum quam rectilineorum, methodo brevissima ([Leuven], 1593)
- Supputatio Ecclesiastica Secundum novam et antiquam Calendarii rationem (Würzburg, 1595)
- Parvum Theatrum Urbium (Frankfurt, Nicolaus Bassalus, 1595).
- Almanack Wurztburger Bisthumbs, awff das Jar nach Christi unsers Seligmacher Geburt 1596 (Würzburg, Georgius Fleischmann, 1596)
- In Archimedis circuli dimensionem expositio et analysis (Würzburg, 1597)
- Newer und Alter Schreib Calender auf das M.D.XCVIII Jar (Würzburg, Georgius Fleischmann, 1598)
- Newer und Alter Screib Calender Auff das MDXCIX Jar (Würzburg, Georgius Fleischmann, 1599)
- Almanach Würtzburger Bisthumbs auff das Jar nach der heilsamen Geburt Jesu Christi MDC (Würzburg, Georgius Fleischmann, 1600)
- Prognosticon Astrologicum oder Teutsche Practica auff das Jar nach der allein selichmachenden Geburt Unsers Heylands Jesu Christi M.DC. (Würzburg, Georgius Fleischmann, 1600)
- Newer und Alter Schreib Calender auff das M.DCI. Jar (Würzburg, Georgius Fleischmann, 1601)
- Prognosticon Astrologicum oder Teutsche Practica auff das Jar nach der Glorwürdigen Geburt Jesu Christi M.DCI. (Würzburg, Georgius Fleischmann, 1601)
- Almanach Wurtzburger Bisthumbs auff dass Jar nach der heilsamen Geburt Jesu Christi M.DC.II. (Würzburg, Georgius Fleischmann, 1602)
- Newer und Alter Schreib Calender auff das M.DC.II. Jar (Würzburg, Georgius Fleischmann, 1602)
- Prognosticum astrologicum oder Teutsche Practica auff das M.DC.II. Jar (Würzburg, Georgius Fleischmann, 1602)
- Universae mathesis idea (Würzburg, Georgius Fleischmann, 1602)
- Chordarum arcubus circuli primariis (Würzburg, Georgius Fleischmann, 1602)
- Newer und Alter Schreib Calender auff das M.DC.III. Jar (Würzburg, Georgius Fleischmann, 1603)
- Prognosticon Astrologicum oder Teutsche Practica auff das Jar ... M.DC.III. (Würzburg, Georgius Fleischmann, 1603)
- Arithmetica quatuor instrumenta nova Methodo ac forma patente exhibita (Würzburg, 1603)
- Mathesis Polemica (Frankfurt, 1605)
- Speculum Astronomicum sive Organum Forma Mappae Expressum (Leuven, Joannes Masius, 1606)
- Canon triangulorum sphaericorum (Mainz, Joannis Albini, 1609)
- Pyrotechnia, hoc est, de ignibus festivis, jocosis artificialibus et seriis, variisque eorum structuris libri duo (Frankfurt, Palthenius, 1611)
