= Helena Pycior =

American historian

Helena Mary Pycior
- Born: 1947 (age 78–79)
- Education: Cornell University
- Occupation: historian

Helena Mary Pycior (born 1947) is an American historian known for her works in the history of mathematics, Marie Curie, and human-animal relations. She is a professor emerita of history at the University of Wisconsin–Madison.

== Education ==
Pycior has a master's degree in mathematics and a Ph.D. in history, both from Cornell University. Her 1976 doctoral dissertation was titled The Role of Sir William Rowan Hamilton in the Development of British Modern Algebra.

== Books ==
Pycior is the author of the book Symbols, Impossible Numbers, and Geometric Entanglements: British Algebra Through the Commentaries on Newton's Universal Arithmetick (Cambridge University Press, 1997), and the coeditor of Creative Couples in the Sciences (with Nancy G. Slack and Pnina G. Abir-Am, Rutgers University Press, 1996).
