= Carolyn Kieran =

Canadian mathematics educator

Carolyn Kieran is a Canadian mathematics educator known for her studies of how students learn algebra. She is a professor emerita of mathematics at the Université du Québec à Montréal.

== Education and career ==
Kieran has bachelor's degrees from Marianopolis College and the Université de Montréal, a master's degree from Concordia University, and a doctorate from McGill University. She joined the mathematics department at the Université du Québec à Montréal in 1983 and became a full professor there in 1991. She retired in 2008 and was named a professor emerita in 2010.

== Books ==
Kieran is a co-author, with J. Pang, D. Schifter, and S. F. Ng, of Early Algebra: Research into its Nature, its Learning, its Teaching (Springer Open, 2016).

She is a co-editor of volumes including:

- Research Issues in the Learning and Teaching of Algebra, Vol. 4 (1989)
- Selected Lectures from the Seventh International Congress on Mathematical Education (1994)
- Approaches to Algebra: Perspectives for Research and Teaching
- Computer Algebra Systems in Secondary School Mathematics Education (2003).
