= Marino Ghetaldi =

Ragusan scientist, mathematician and physicist (1568–1626)

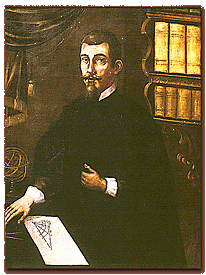
- Born: 2 October 1568; Dubrovnik, Republic of Ragusa (modern Croatia)
- Died: 11 April 1626 (aged 57) Dubrovnik, Republic of Ragusa (modern Croatia)
- Occupations: mathematician, physicist,

Marino Ghetaldi (Latin: Marinus Ghetaldus; Croatian: Marin Getaldić; 2 October 1568 – 11 April 1626) was a Ragusan and Croatian scientist. A mathematician and physicist who studied in Italy, England and Belgium, his best results are mainly in physics, especially optics, and mathematics. He was one of the few students of François Viète and friend of Giovanni Camillo Glorioso.

== Biography ==
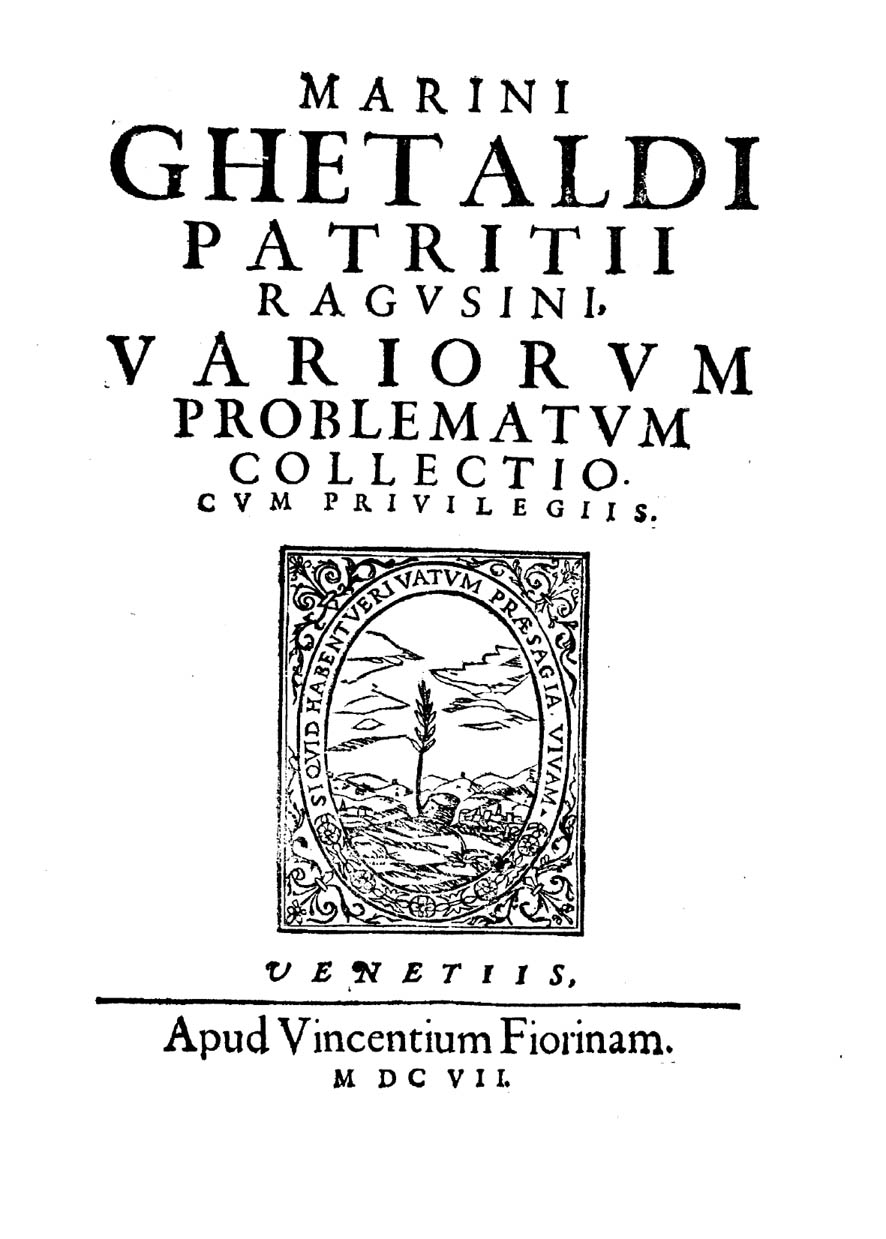
Variorum problematum collectio, 1607

Born into the Ghetaldi noble family, he was one of six children. He was known for the application of algebra in geometry and his research in the field of geometrical optics on which he wrote 7 works including the Promotus Archimedus (1603) and the De resolutione et compositione mathematica (1630). He also produced a leaflet with the solutions of 42 geometrical problems, Variorum problematum collectio, in 1607 and set grounds of algebraization of geometry. His contributions to geometry had been cited by Dutch physicist Christiaan Huygens and Edmond Halley, who calculated the orbit of what is known as Halley's Comet, in England.

Ghetaldi was the constructor of the parabolic mirror (66 cm in diameter), kept today at the National Maritime Museum in London. He was also a pioneer in making conic lenses. During his sojourn in Padua he met Galileo Galilei, with whom he corresponded regularly. He was a good friend to the French mathematician François Viète. He was offered the post of professor of mathematics at Old University of Leuven in Belgium, at the time one of the most prestigious university centers in Europe.

Ghetaldi.

He was also engaged in politics and was the envoy of the Republic of Ragusa in Constantinople in 1606 as well as a member of the Great and Small Council, the political bodies of the Republic. He was married to Marija Sorkočević, who died giving birth to their third daughter; they had three daughters: Anica, Franica, and Marija.

== Works ==
- Promotus Archimedis seu De varijs corporum generibus grauitate & magnitudine comparatis (in Latin). Roma: Luigi Zanetti. 1603.
- Variorum problematum collectio (in Latin). Venezia: Vincenzo Fiorina. 1607.

== Legacy ==
Two notable localities in Dubrovnik are associated with the name of Getaldić: Bete's Cave, named after Marino's nickname, where he conducted experiments with igniting mirrors; and Podzvizd, a key strategic tower in the Ston fortification system which he was commissioned to build by the authorities of the Republic of Dubrovnik in 1604.

== See also ==
- House of Getaldić
- List of notable Ragusans

== Sources ==
- Vujić, Marko. "Marin Getaldić - Život i djelo" (PDF). SVEUČILIŠTE JOSIPA JURJA STROSSMAYERA U OSIJEKU ODJEL ZA FIZIKU.

== Bibliography ==
- A. Favaro, "Marino Ghetaldi", Amici e corrisponsdenti di Galileo, 3 vols. (Firenze, 1983), 2, 911-34.
- H. Wieleitner, "Marino Ghetaldi und die Anfänge der Koordinatengeometrie", Bibliotheca mathematica, 3rd ser., 13, pp. 242–247.
- G. Barbieri, "Marino Ghetaldi", in Pietro F. Martecchini, Galleria di Ragusei illustri, (Ragusa, 1840).
