= Jean V of Parthenay =

Protestant French nobleman (c. 1512 – 1566)

Jean V de Parthenay-L'Archevêque
- Born: c. 1512; Parthenay, Nouvelle-Aquitaine, France
- Died: 1 September 1566 (age 53 or 54); Mouchamps, Vendée, Pays de la Loire, France
- Occupations: Military leader, diplomat
- Spouse: Antoinette d'Aubeterre
- Children: Catherine de Parthenay
- Parents: Jean IV de Parthenay, the Archbishop, Lord of Soubise, Jean IV, lord of the Château du Parc-Soubise (father); Michelle de Saubonne (mother)
- Relatives: Anne de Parthenay (sister)

Jean V de Parthenay-L'Archevêque, or Larchevêque, Sieur de Soubise (c. 1512 – 1 September 1566), was a Protestant French nobleman, last lord of Mouchamps, from the Parthenay-l'Archevêque family. His father, Jean IV de Parthenay, died before he was born. His mother was humanist Michelle de Saubonne. He married Antoinette d'Aubeterre, and their daughter and was Catherine de Parthenay, who later married René II, Viscount of Rohan.

During the Italian War of 1551–1559, he served as a fighter and ambassador under Henry II, (Note: Henry II of France was the Duke of Orléans 1519–1536, the Dauphin of France upon the death of his elder brother Francis in 1536. He was King of France from 31 March 1547, died in 1559.) with whom he had been friends since childhood. He was a close friend of Henry II's wife Catherine de' Medici.

He converted to Calvinism in 1562 after the massacre of Vassy (Wassy). During the French Wars of Religion, he became one of the most ardent supporters of Louis I, Prince of Condé, and the Huguenots. François Viète, who served as his lawyer and secretary from 1564 to 1566, recorded his memoirs. They were published in 1879 by Jules Bonnot and extensively commented on and popularized by Frédéric Ritter and Benjamin Fillon.

Jean V of Parthenay was accused of ordering the death of Francis, Duke of Guise. His government of Lyons (1563) nevertheless spared Catholics the cruelties of François de Beaumont, Baron des Adrets. His efforts helped to keep the peace between the warring factions until he died in 1566. For a time, he even hoped to convert the queen mother to the doctrine of the Calvinists. According to the 16th-century historian Jacques Auguste de Thou, "Jean de Parthenay combined an august birth with great moderation and uncommon skill."

== Personal life ==
=== Early life ===
Arms of the lords of Parthenay : "burrelé of silver and azure, with a band of gules debruising over the whole."

Born about 1512, Jean V de Parthenay was the only son of Jean IV, lord of the Château du Parc-Soubise, and Michelle de Saubonne. Jean IV was also the lord of Vendrennes, Goyau fief, and Mouchamps.

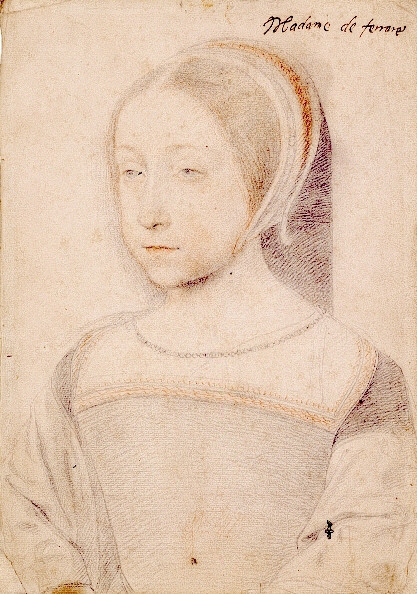
Jean Clouet, Portrait of Renée de France duchesse de Chartres et de Ferrare (1510-1575), to whom Jean V's mother was a lady-in-waiting, c. 1520, Musée Condé

Upon the death of Jean V's father, his mother became a lady-in-waiting to Renée of France. She was a scholar and introduced Clément Marot to the court. Jean V was an enfant d'honneur, a child who played with the then Dauphin Henry II, who was seven years younger than him. Jean V was well educated in humanities and was regarded as a cultured young person of his time. Raised by his mother versed in the classical humanities, frequenting poets from an early age, and nurtured by his sister Anne of Latin or Greek texts, Jean V hardly seems predestined for the military career in which his life was subsequently worn out.

In 1528, Renée of France married Duke Ercole II d'Este and moved to Ferrara, Italy, along with Michelle, Jean V, and two of his sisters. Clément Marot joined them shortly after that. Jean V grew fond of Italy. In 1536, his mother and the remainder of the French members of the court were expelled from Ferrara.

According to La Popelinière, Jean V of Parthenay was "a gentleman of fine appearance, endowed with great estates and estates, liberal and honorable in all his actions, grave in speech and manners, affable and gracious nevertheless in conversation, disdainful of his domestic affairs as much as affectionate to the public and especially to the good of the kingdom, diligent and enemy of the birds".

In 1549, his mother died five days after the death of his sister Anne de Parthenay, wife of Antoine de Pons.

=== Marriage and children ===
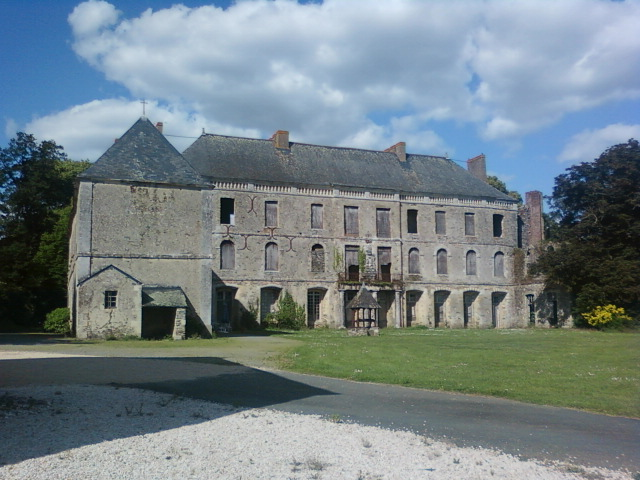
Château du Parc-Soubise was rebuilt in 1771 and has burnt down since then.

On 9 May 1553, he married Antoinette d'Aubeterre, daughter of François II, Baron d'Aubeterre, and Isabelle de Saint-Seine in Paris. Antoinette was then Queen Catherine de' Medici's companion.

Jean V and Antoinette had a clear division of labor. He concerned himself with business and political affairs that often took him away from home. Antoinette managed the financial and other private affairs that concerned her family and relationships in their community. Born in 1532, she was twenty years younger than her husband, but she overtook the management of Château du Parc-Soubise, for example, by calling Bernard Palissy and Philibert Hamelin, whom she protected, to settle some differences between Jean V and his vassals.

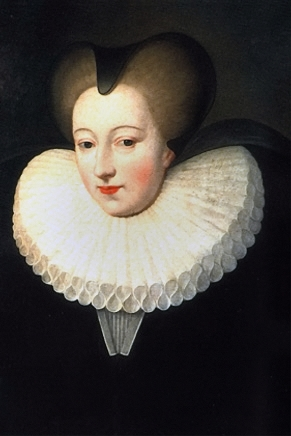
Catherine de Parthenay, duchesse de Rohan, Musée Rochelais d'Histoire Protestante

On 22 March 1554, his wife Antoinette gave birth to their daughter Catherine, who would later become a celebrated woman of letters and action, writer, mathematician, and protector of science. Through her, Jean V de Parthenay is one of the ancestors of the House of Rohan.

== Religion ==
Early in his adult life, the child of honor of Henry II, Jean V of Parthenay seemed destined for the pleasures of the court until he met John Calvin in Ferrara.

Protestant celebrations of Pré-aux-Clercs in Paris began in 1557. Antoine de Navarre and his brother, the Prince of Condé, attended the celebration from 13 to 19 May 1558, which drew many gentlemen to the Reformed faith. This is also the case for Jean V de Parthenay, who converted to the new religion. Antoinette, his wife, preached on his lands. Jean V, however, was hesitant to announce his conversion and waited for some time before making it known. Converting to Protestantism was a dangerous position at the time. It meant leaving a life that had been built upon relationships with priests for confessions and those who offered her spiritual counsel. There was also the risk of persecution.

Peace made, Jean V de Parthenay was acquitted of the Renaudie affair in 1560 and he returned to the good graces of the queen and tried again to bring her back to the cause of the Calvinists. He paid court to her in Lyon during her visit, and stayed with her for a long time. He saw her again in Niort during her trip to Bayonne and accompanied her to La Rochelle. He no longer benefited from the complicity of Jacqueline de Longwy, Duchess of Montpensier, who died in 1561, but again encountered the jealousy of her husband, the Louis (III) de Bourbon, Duke of Montpensier.

About early 1562, Jean V announced "loyally" to Catherine de' Medici his intention to abandon the mass. Interestingly, Catherine de’ Medici, the Catholic queen mother, allowed her children to attend Protestant services in the early 1560s and asked Jean V to only have Protestant preaching at night. She tried to stop Jean V from becoming a Protestant and promised him the most significant charges in the kingdom. Among other things, she offered him tutoring from young King Charles. The queen, anxious to retain support, sent him the Order of Saint Michael as if to invite him to return.

Returning home after he visited La Rochelle, Parthenay declared to Antoinette d'Aubeterre that there was nothing more to hope for on that side. Catherine de' Medici now refused to admit before him her former sympathies for the reformed religion.

== Military and royal occupations ==
=== The beginning (1539–1553) ===
Jean V de Parthenay took up the profession of arms. A favorite of Henry II, Duke of Orléans; the Dauphin, Francis; and of the Dauphin's brother, he was from then on in all of Henry II's wars. He was appointed gentilhomme ordinaire of the king's chamber (gentleman of the king's chamber), and later governor and bailiff of Chartres in 1539.

Jean V was captured in Lille, Flanders, where he remained a prisoner for a year. Not wanting to reveal his real name, he identified himself as 'Ambleville' to the jailers, an assumed name he came up with on the spot. (Note: His memoirs recount that, having forgotten the name given to his enemies, Jean took over two hours to remember it. The rest of his captivity is eased by the attention paid to him by the wife and daughter of his keeper. Upon his return, he sided against the Guises and allied himself to the Châtillon family, to whom he was like a fourth brother.)

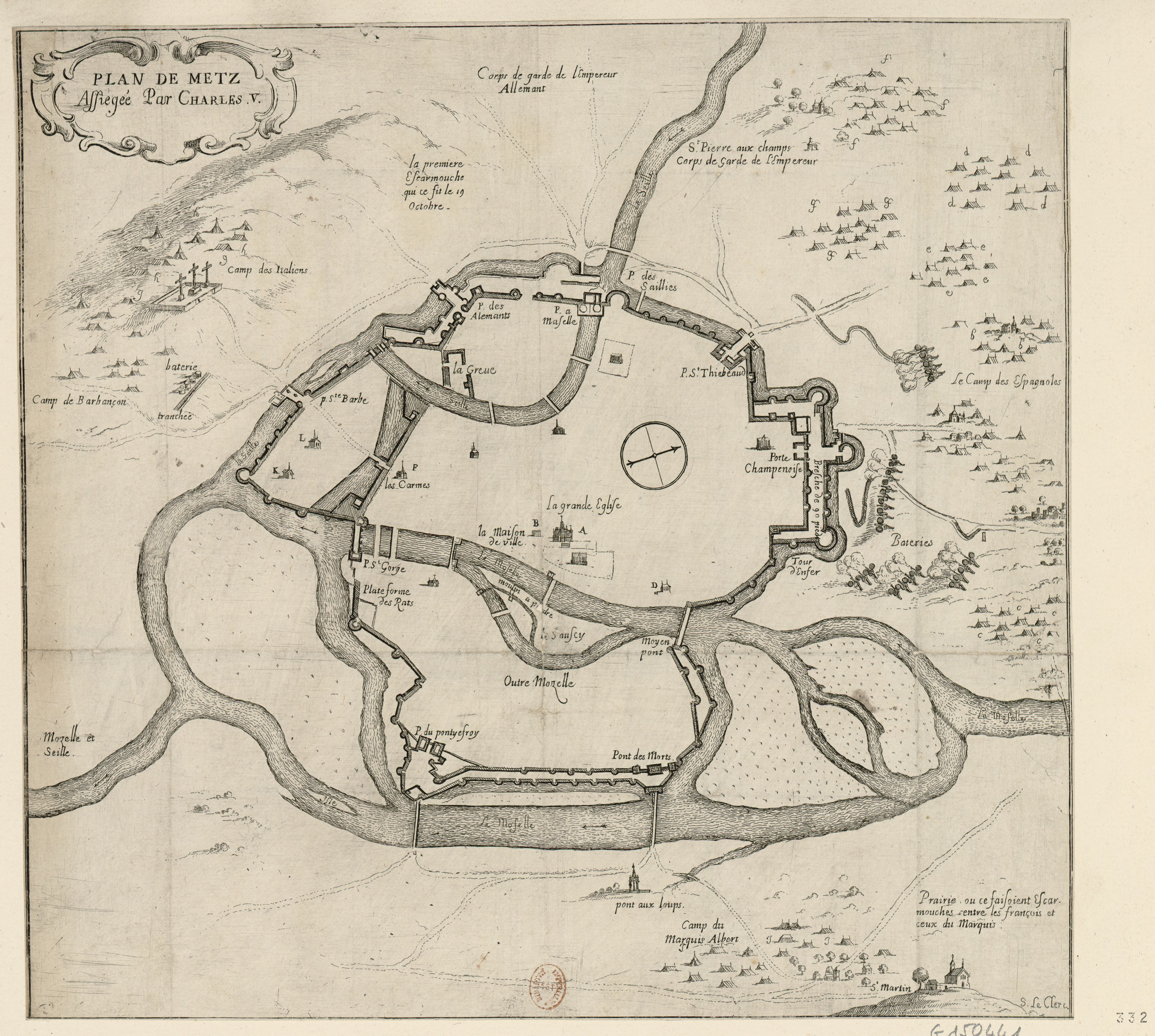
Sébastien Leclerc, Siege of Metz (1552) by Charles V, Holy Roman Emperor, Bibliothèque nationale de France

In September 1552, Jean V was sent to Nancy by Henry II to sound out Nicolas, Duke of Mercœur, Count of Vaudémont. The latter, betting on Charles V, Holy Roman Emperor's respect for the neutrality of Lorraine, declined the offer. From October 1552 to early January 1553, Jean V de Parthenay participated in the Siege of Metz (1552).

=== War of Parma (1553) ===
On 4 January 1553, Jean V received an order from King Henry II to go to the Duke of Parma and bring him to Fontainebleau.

Immediately after his marriage in May 1553, Jean V received the order to go to Picardy to fight for Thérouanne and Hesdin. They were commanded by Antoine of Navarre, whose wife Jeanne d'Albret, pregnant with the future Henry IV, remained at the scene of the fight with her husband. The king's armies suffered a terrible defeat. Antoine of Navarre saved Hesdin from the Imperials but lost Thérouanne between May and June. A few months later, Charles V took over and razed the two strongholds.

Around July 1552, Henry II discovered the rapprochement between the Duke of Parma, Ottavio Farnese, and the King of Spain, Philip II. The king, his advisers, and Cardinal Oliviero Carafa decided to act. The Guises had Jean V de Parthenay sent on a mission to Parma with orders to propose an alliance between the Duke and King Henry II that included a marriage between his son Oratio, Duke of Castro and Diane de France, Duchess of Angoulême. He was given letters from Henry II to give to Ercole II d'Este, Duke of Ferrara to rally him and ask him to join the Pope in combating Spanish Inquisitions.

In preparation for the War of Parma, Jean V was appointed lieutenant general for His Majesty and then moved to Siena on 25 November 1554. On 25 February 1555, he moved to Parma at the rate of 500 pounds per month and helped to keep the duke in benevolent neutrality concerning the French, though Farnese ended up getting closer to Philip II of Spain two years later. Around the same time, Jean de Parthenay witnessed the capitulation of Montluc in Siena on 17 April, being unable to help him due to a lack of troops.

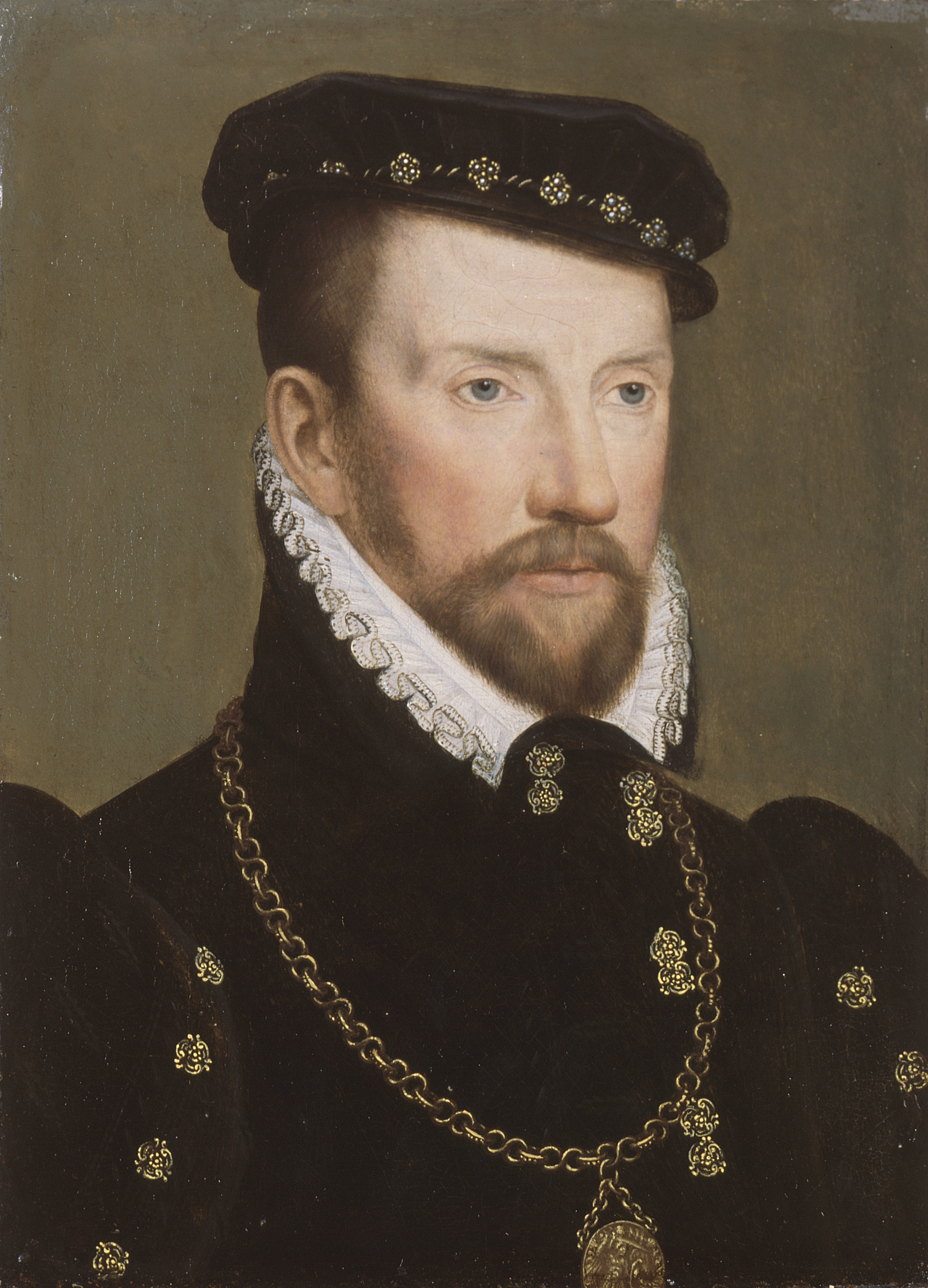
François Clouet, Admiral Gaspard II de Coligny, 16th century, oil on wood, Saint Louis Art Museum

In 1555, Jean V joined the assault on Denain with Admiral Gaspard II de Coligny. There, wounded in the head and thrown to the ground, he was almost choked to death by his helm. He nevertheless continued the assault bareheaded until the end of the battle. Jean V commissioned surveying work from Bernard Palissy in 1555.

He fought in the capture of Calais (3 January 1558) with his friend le maréchal Strozzi. In August 1558, the king granted John V of Parthenay a gratuity of 6,900 pounds as a reward for the wars in Italy and "others". However, because of the boldness of his words and his foresight of military views during councils of war, Jean V made himself an enemy of Gaspard de Saulx, Marshal de Tavannes.

=== The Renaudie affair (1559–1560) ===
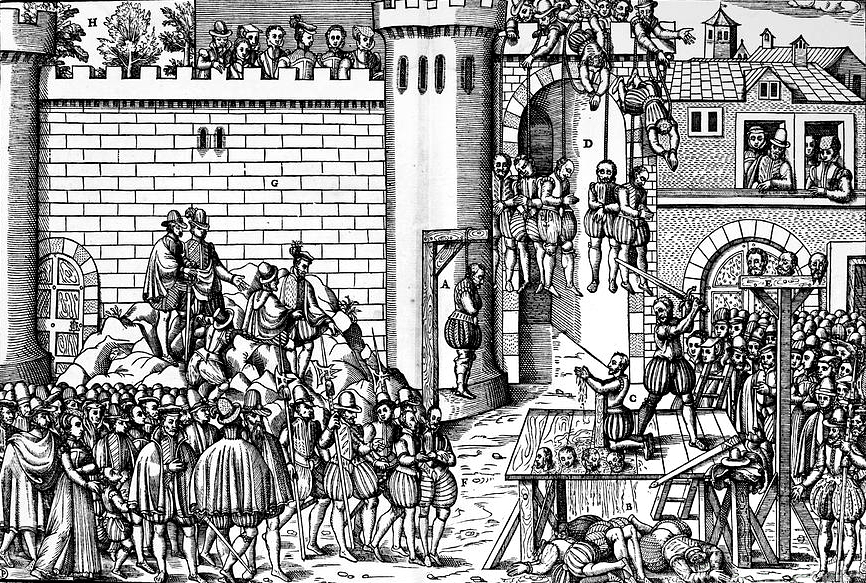
Jean Perrissin and Jacque Tortorel, Conjuration of Amboise, 16th century

King Henry II died in 1559 and was succeeded by his son François II, then only 15. Though he was old enough to rule without a regent, he delegated his power to the House of Guise. Jean du Barry, Lord of La Renaudie, a friend of Jean's, then imagined removing the queen-mother and the young king from the influence of the Guise.

La Renaudie took the lead in the conspiracy, which originated in December 1559, in Geneva, shortly after the execution of Anne du Bourg. Its goal was to impose around the young king a council of regency, where the princes of blood, particularly Condé, would hold the first place. Antoine de Bourbon was opposed to it as well as Calvin; it does not seem that the latter nor Théodore de Bèze were really informed of the real aims of the conspirators. La Renaudie was personally angry with François II and Charles de Guise who had his brother-in-law arrested and executed. He gave himself as accomplices a few friends, Raunay, Baron Charles de Castelnau, François II, Baron d'Aubeterre (Jean V de Parthenay's brother-in-law), Edme de Ferrière-Maligny (brother of Jean II de Ferrières), Captain Mazères, but also the father of Agrippa d'Aubigne. If the Guises resisted, the conspirators promised to massacre them. La Renaudie, who linked up with Soubise at the siege of Metz, confided to him his intention of seizing the king from the month of September 1559, at a time when the conspiracy was far from having taken shape.

A first assembly of conspirators was held in Nantes in February 1560, and their troops, nearly 500 men, split up with the intention of moving towards Blois, Tours, and Orléans. Originally scheduled for 10 March 1560; the operation was postponed until 17 March. However, from 12 February, the Guises, warned by the Parisian lawyer with whom La Renaudie was staying, were made aware of the plot. They decided to take refuge in Amboise. Condé d'Andelot, Coligny, and Odet de Chatillon—taken into confidence by La Renaudie—negotiated an amnesty for Protestants except for the conspirators with Guise.

On 15 March, Jacques de Savoie, Duke of Nemours, seized the castle of Noizay, where some of the conspirators had gathered. Condemned for the crime of lèse-majesté, Castelnau, Mazères, and Raunay died beheaded or hanged at the windows of the castle of Amboise. For the next few days, La Renaudie was nowhere to be found. Jean V, for his part, was retained by the service of the queen mother, who interrogated Jean V and tried to ascertain where his friend was hiding.

Conversation between the Queen mother and Jean V de Parthenay. Jean replied,

When I know, I'd rather be dead than say it.

The Queen Mother assures him that he need fear nothing if La Renaudie has done nothing against the King. Jean V de Parthenay replied,

I know well that it will be found that he acted against the king, since he acted against those of Guise, because today in France it is a criminal lèse-majesté to have acted against them, of as indeed they are the ones who are kings.

The conspiracy ended in a massacre. Bertrand de Chandieu's troops were destroyed when they marched towards Ambroise on 17 March. La Renaudie was killed on 19 March.

=== Knighted (1561) ===
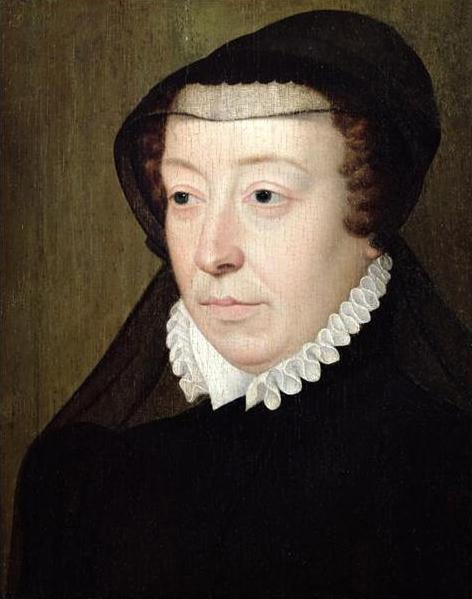
Workshop of François Clouet , Portrait of Catherine de' Medici (1519-1589), c. 1565, oil on panel, Musée Carnavalet

On 7 December 1561, Jean V was made a Knight of the King's Order at Saint-Germain-en-Laye. Queen Catherine de' Medici wanted to do anything that she could to counterbalance the power of the Guises. The new king, Charles IX, was ten years old when he came to the throne. On 17 January 1562, the Edict of Saint-Germain, also called the Edict of January, gave many assurances to Protestants, but the Parliament of Paris, very Catholic, refused to register this royal act of tolerance.

== French Wars of Religion (1562–1598) ==
Jean V became one of the best Protestant captains acting under the orders of Condé at the start of the Wars of Religion.

=== The Massacre of Wassy (1562) ===
On 1 March 1562, Francis, Duke of Guise passed through Wassy in Champagne, and sent his armed men to interrupt a Protestant ceremony; 500 Huguenots were forced out of their place of worship. About fifty people were killed, and more than a hundred were wounded.

This massacre, which had nothing fortuitous, went down in history as the massacre of Wassy and set in motion half a century of religious wars, followed by those of Cahors, Carcassonne, Tours, Auxerre, Avignon, and more.

Jean V, citing the sympathies the queen once declared for Calvin, made great efforts to win Catherine de' Medici over to the reform party. He spent hours with her and Chancellor de L'Hospital. The Guises, who sought power, went to Fontainebleau. At their approach, the queen feared for the kingdom. Jean V could not convince her to flee. She begged him to stay and then asked him not to take up arms. It was too late: Jean V revealed to her that he would join forces with those of his friends, to deliver her and to deliver the king from the captivity to which the Lorraine party reduced him.

=== Lyon headquarters (1562) ===
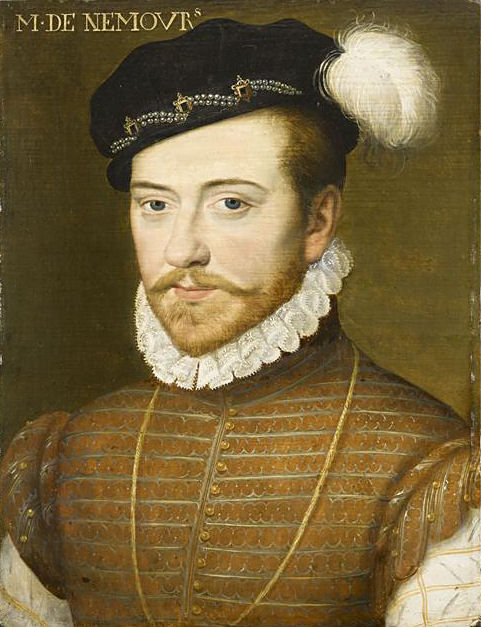
Workshop of François Clouet, Portrait de Jacques de Savoie, duc de Nemours, oil on panel, c. 1566, Musée Condé

Having left Fontainebleau, Jean V de Parthenay came to meet Admiral de Coligny and Condé in Meaux. Their army passed through Paris to Orléans. Condé, Coligny, d'Andelot, La Rochefoucauld, and Soubise went to find the queen near Beaugency. Their conference produced no results. Shortly after, Jean V became critically ill. Barely recovered, he was sent to Lyon by Condé.

He left on horseback with forty gentlemen, including his chaplain, Claude Courtois, Sieur de Lessart. He crossed the Vivarais, Burgundy, where the bailly of Autun followed him for three days with 120 men without daring to attack him. He took command of Lyon on 15 or 19 July 1562, with the full powers of the Prince of Condé (letters dated 25 May) to counterbalance the abuses and cruelties of François de Beaumont, Baron des Adrets. He joined forces with Charles Dupuy de Montbrun.

Catherine de' Medici wrote several times, asking him to return to the city. Jean V replied, "as long as he was governor of Lyon, he would keep it faithfully in the name of the king and queen."

He then faced the Catholic armies of Jacques de Savoie, Duke of Nemours. One of the most courageous leaders of the Protestant party on the eve of Saint Barthélemy, Jean V de Parthenay managed to hold the city until the pacification edict of 19 March 1563. This siege is illustrated two years later by the "speech that occurred in the city of Lion [Lyon] while Monsieur Soubise commanded there," a pleading attributed to François Viète and published (for the first time in the 19th century) by Hector de the Ferriere. Although suspected of sympathy with Soubise, the document revealed how Soubise managed to feed Lyon during his siege and in what resolution he finds himself facing Duke of Nemours. It also allowed Jean V to maintain his freedom of worship. He became one of the heroes of the Huguenot cause by thoughtful protection of the city. Haag states that he would be known "by his virtues, even more that by his services".

During this siege, Jean V organized the supply of the city by the Dombes, which attracted to him the unfailing hatred of Louis III de Bourbon, Duke of Montpensier.

=== The Assassination of the Duke of Guise (1563) ===
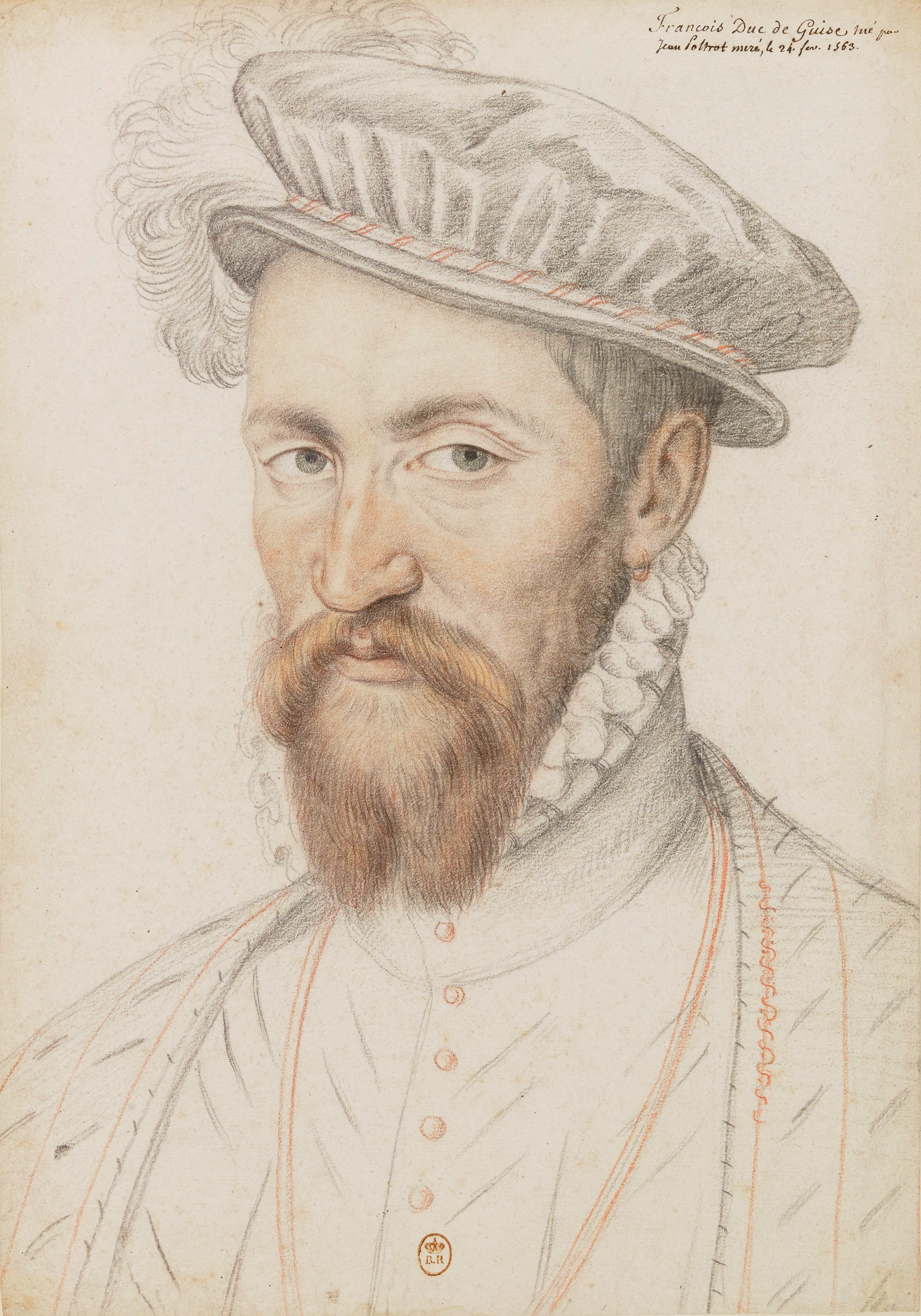
François Clouet , Portrait au crayon du duc François de Guise, charcoal and sanguine on paper, 16th century, Bibliothèque nationale de France

Francis, Duke of Guise was assassinated on 24 February 1563 by the Huguenot Jean de Poltrot during the Siege of Orléans. Poltrot was captured and tortured while in prison to find out who participated in planning the assassination of the Duke. Nothing that Poltrot stated led to a viable theory about who was complicit. Poltrot was executed on 18 March.

The presumptions against Jean V are that during the siege of Lyon, he spoke of killing de Guise. Moreover, during the siege, Jean V sent Poltrot to Admiral de Coligny in June or July 1562, and their accusers saw in this evidence of a plot.

Antoinette d'Aubeterre hired François Viète, a jurist, as a legal adviser for her husband. Viète successfully addressed the suspicions against Jean V by providing documents during his administration of the city of Lyon and Viète's summarization of Jean V's behavior the previous year in the form of a memoir.

=== Last years (1564–1566) ===
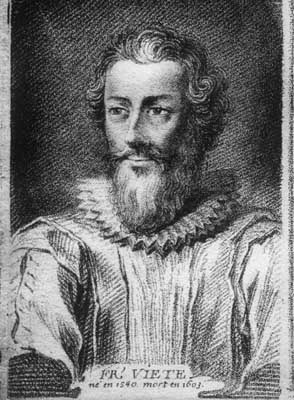
François Viète

To write his memoirs, an account of his life and the genealogy of the Parthenays were commissioned from François Viète, the great mathematician. After Viète went with him to Lyon to illustrate his defense in 1564, the lawyer was assigned the role of tutor to Soubise's daughter, the learned Catherine de Parthenay.

In October 1565, he saw Catherine de' Medici again in Meaux in April 1566, one last time in Moulins, where he was almost assassinated with all the Huguenot leaders present in this city.

== Death (1566) ==
Returning from Moulins at the beginning of the summer of 1566, Jean V de Parthenay fell seriously ill. On 8 August 1566, Jean V wrote his will, declaring that he wanted to be buried according to the form and manner observed by the Reformed churches of the kingdom.

A quarter of an hour before dying on 1 September 1566, Jean V blessed his daughter. His last words were to place his soul in the hands of God.

The Huguenot party expressed its sadness to his wife and daughter. The Queen of Navarre, Jeanne d'Albret, their military leader, Admiral de Coligny, and their spiritual leader, Théodore de Bèze sent their condolences to them. Antoinette died in 1580.

== Reception ==
=== A chaotic fate ===
The party of Lorraine princes and, during the following century, some Catholic historians, Brantôme, Antoine Varillas, then Bossuet, the eagle of Meaux, hardly credit him with good deeds. They suspected him of having been involved in the conspiracy of La Renaudie, and of being one of the instigators of the assassination of Francis, Duke of Guise. Whatever efforts his secretary may have expended to acquit him, Jean V remained one of the culprits of these plots. Bossuet even saw encouragement in the words that Jean V launched to Poltrot du Méré, who had come to confess to him "that he had resolved in his mind to deliver France from so much misery, by killing the Duc de Guisse"; familiar words with him, to which Jean V replied that he did his usual duty; God would know how to provide for it by other means.

He could not find peace and, although he harbored few illusions as to his chances of converting the Queen Mother to the "true religion", his repeated, ongoing efforts caused the party of Lorraine to abandon their last forces fairly quickly.

=== The judgement of posterity ===
Upon the death of Jean V, his daughter and heiress Catherine became Dame de Soubise. She first married Charles de Quellenec, Baron du Pont. In her second marriage, the land that she inherited, the land of Soubise, passed to Benjamin, Duke of Soubise, her youngest son with René II, Viscount of Rohan. On his death in 1642, the seigneury of Soubise passed to his niece the Duchess of Rohan, who bequeathed it to her daughter Anne de Rohan-Chabot, wife of his cousin François, Prince of Soubise. The seigneury of Soubise was erected by letters patent (unregistered) of Louis XIV dated March 1667, in the Principality of Soubise in favor of François, Prince of Soubise (1630–1712). The latter's grandson Charles de Rohan-Soubise, Marshal of France protected by the Marquise de Pompadour, left the memory of an incapable favourite, leaving his men to be massacred at the Battle of Rossbach in 1757. A song, "les reproaches de The Tulip to Madame de Pompadour," recounts this episode. Its lyrics have been attributed to Voltaire.

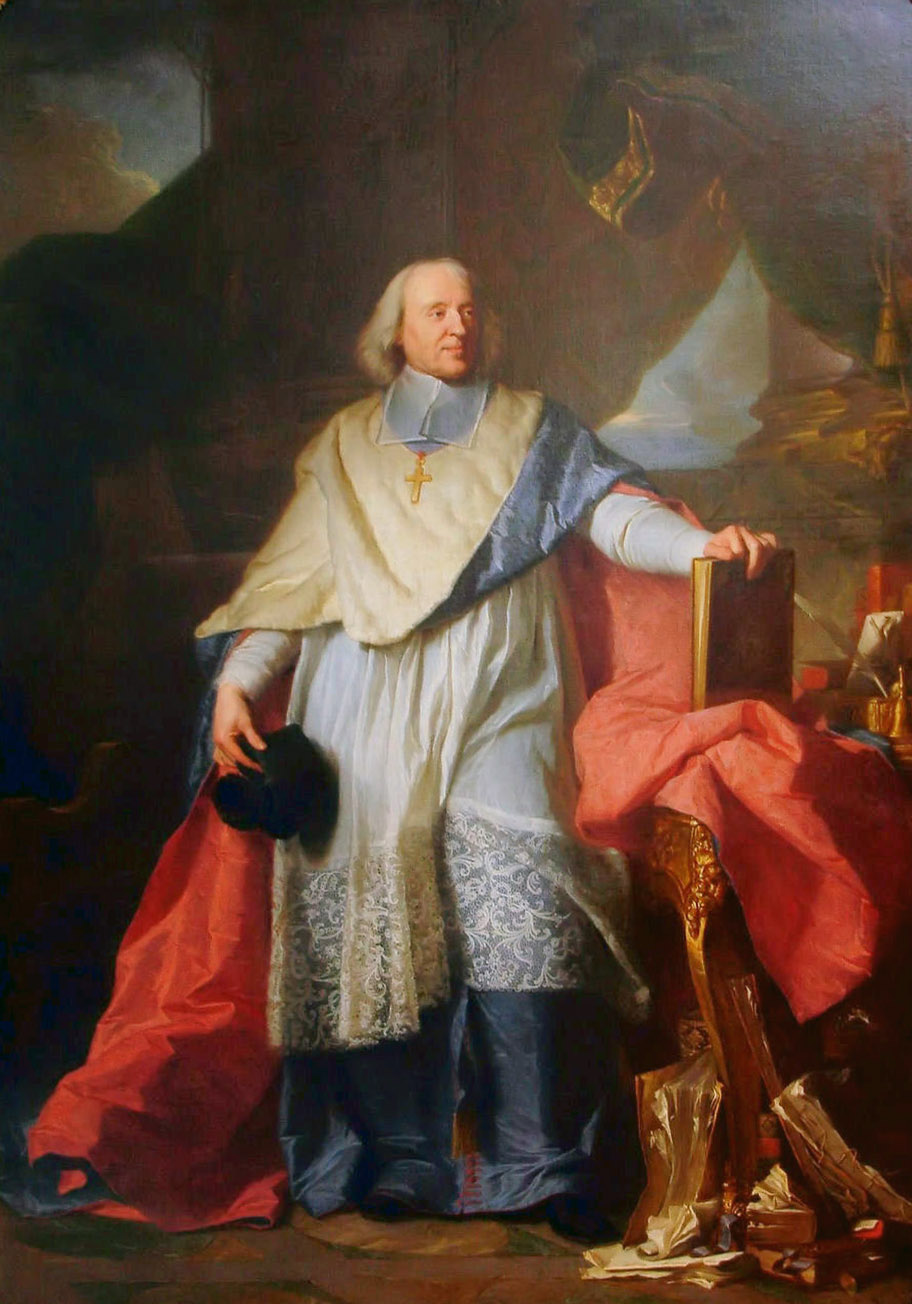
Hyacinthe Rigaud, Portrait of Jacques-Bénigne Bossuet (1627-1704), 1702, Louvre

Brantôme and Bossuet were extremely severe against Jean V de Parthenay. For one as for the other, he was the accomplice of the assassin of Francis, Duke of Guise. Jean-Antoine Roucher says of the first,

Brantôme charged his memory. He positively accuses him of having incited Poltrot to the assassination of the Duc de Guise: but as Jean Le Laboureur has well remarked, Brantôme enveloped the Sieur de Soubise in the hatred he bore to the Lord of Aubeterre.

The second recognizes himself,

[Queen Catherine de' Medici] had continual talks with Soubise, a man of great quality, devoted to the Huguenot party and well instructed in the new doctrine.

The memory of Jean V de Parthenay, however, was never completely erased. Antoine Varillas read his memoirs and took it for granted that Catherine de' Medici had some Protestant leanings, or at least that she was Catholic only out of politics. In the 18th century, Dreux du Radier remembers that Jean de Parthenay failed to convert Queen Catherine de' Medici to Protestantism and Louis Moréri mentions his figure in his large dictionary, and recognizes him as "a man of great merit and great service". In the 19th century, with the revival of Protestant studies, however, the figure of Jean de Parthenay regained prominence. Eugène and Émile Haag, Auguste-François Lièvre, Jules Bonnet, Hector de la Ferrière, Auguste Laugel bring to light all that is chivalrous in his attitude. Finally, the rediscovery of François Viète by Frédéric Ritter and Benjamin Fillon naturally leads many historians of science to focus on this minor nobility of Poitou, open to new ideas, keen on Greek, Latin and Hebrew, a small protective circle of an astonishing master of requests, who, starting from the bottom, was awakened to mathematics by a 12-year-old girl, served as secretary to her father, and was about to found the new algebra. Protector of Palissy, father of a young scholar, it is also in this capacity that Jean de Parthenay also deserves to be known, as the first protector of a founding mathematician.

=== Some dating issues ===
For some authors, who confuse him with his son-in-law, Jean Parthenay would have died during the Massacre of Saint Bartholomew. For others, he would have survived these massacres, and on 13 May 1573, his wife, Antoinette, taken prisoner under the city of Lyons, wrote to him to "rather let her perish than betray her cause". The error is due to Agrippa d'Aubigné, who in his history of the wars of religion confuses the son-in-law with his father-in-law. It is noted in its time by Pierre Bayle.

== See also ==
- Wars of religion
- French kings
- French wars

== Bibliography ==
- Blaisdell, Charmarie Jenkins (1982). "Calvin's Letters to Women: The Courting of Ladies in High Places". The Sixteenth Century Journal. 13 (3): 67–84. doi:10.2307/2539605. JSTOR 2539605.
- Dewald, Jonathan (2015). Status, Power, and Identity in Early Modern France: The Rohan Family 1550–1715. The Pennsylvania State University. ISBN 978-0-271-06616-5.
- Dupuy, Ernest (1970). Bernard Palissy (in French). Slatkine. p. 155.
- Haag, Eugène (1856). La France protestante: ou, Vies des protestants français qui se sont fait un nom dans l'histoire depuis les premiers temps de la réformation jusqu'à la reconnaissance du principe de la liberté des cultes par l'Assemblée nationale; ouvrage précéde d'une notice historique sur le protestantisme en France, suivi de pièces justificatives, et rédigé sur des documents en grand partie inédits (in French). J. Cherbuliez.
- Lièvre, Auguste-François (1860). Histoire des protestants et des églises réformées du Poitou (in French). Grassart.
- Revue des deux mondes: XLIX Année Troisième Période. Vol. 33. Paris: J. Claye – A. Quantin, Bureau de la Revue des deux mondes. 1879.
- Revue des deux mondes: XLIX Année Troisième Période. Vol. 49. Paris: J. Claye – A. Quantin, Bureau de la Revue des deux mondes. 1879.
- Soubise, Jean de Parthenay-Larchevêque; Bonnet, Jules (1879). Mémoires de la vie de Jean de Parthenay-Larchevêque, sieur de Soubise : accompagnés de lettres relatives aux guerres d'Italie sous Henri II et au Siège de Lyon (1562–1563). University of Ottawa. Paris : L. Willen.
- Sutherland, Nicola (1981). "The Assassination of Francois Duc de Guise February 1563". The Historical Journal. 24 2 (2): 279–295. doi:10.1017/S0018246X00005471. JSTOR 2638787. S2CID 159857086.
