= Antoinette d'Aubeterre =

French aristocrat (1532–1580)

- Born: 1532
- Died: 1580 (aged 47–48)
- Other names: Antoinette Bouchard-d'Aubeterre
- Spouse: Jean V de Parthenay
- Parent(s): François II Bouchard, Seigneur d'Aubeterre and Isabelle de Saint-Seine

Antoinette d'Aubeterre (1532–1580) was a French noble woman, who received a good classical education, learning mathematics from François Viète. François was her legal advisor, personal secretary, and tutor to Antoinette and her husband Jean V de Parthenay's daughter Catherine de Parthenay. Catherine married at about the age of 14 to Charles de Quelennec. Catherine was kidnapped by her husband in the middle of a scandal and Antoinette intervened to free her daughter.

== Early life ==
Antoinette d'Aubeterre, the daughter of François II Bouchard, Seigneur d'Aubeterre and Isabelle de Saint-Seine was born in 1532.

== Huguenot ==
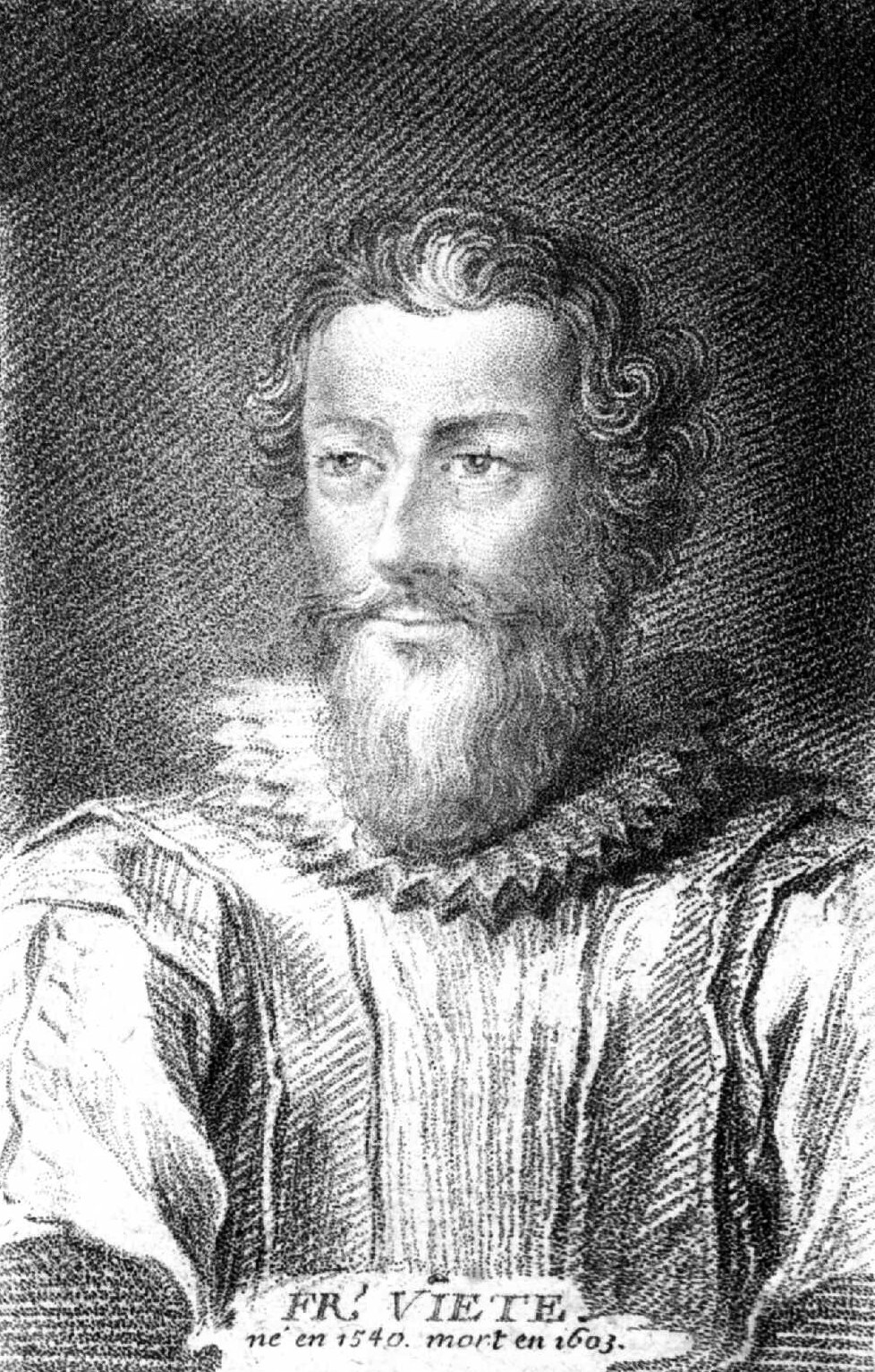
François Viète, legal adviser, personal secretary, and tutor

Antoinette d'Aubeterre hired François Viète, a jurist, as her legal adviser to help her navigate legal issues that arose between the Calvinists (Huguenots) and the Catholics. He was born a Catholic, and did not personally engage in religious disputes. From 1564 to 1571, he worked as her personal secretary.

== Marriage and children ==
Antoinette d'Aubeterre and Jean V of Parthenay were married on 3 May 1553. Their daughter, Catherine de Parthenay, was born on 22 March 1554 at Château du Parc-Soubise.

The couple had a clear division of labor. Jean V concerned himself with business and political affairs that often took him away from home. Antoinette managed the financial and other private affairs that concerned her family and their relationships in their community.

François Viète, who had been Antoinette's former mathematics tutor, was hired to be her daughter Catherine's tutor. Viète taught Catherine geography, current discoveries, cosmographic knowledge, and mathematics, from 1564 to 1568. While he worked for Antoinette d'Aubeterre, he worked on trigonometric functions that were published in two of his books (1579). Viète co-founded modern algebra. He also published manuscripts of memoirs and genealogy of the Parthenays. Antoinette was his patron.

Catherine married Charles de Quelennec in 1568 (when she was about 14). They had a difficult marriage and her husband imprisoned his wife at a castle in Brittany.

=== Intervention when Catherine was sequestered ===
External image
- Letter by Catherine de Parthenay to her mother 6 September 1570 (French)

On 6 September 1570, as Catherine was about to be kidnapped, she wrote a letter to her mother Antoinette. In it, she said she was being taken against her will and could not provide the care she wanted to provide for her ill mother. She stated she was the same as she "was on the eve of my wedding and that I have always been since my birth". Catherine sneaked letters out of the castle. They were written in invisible ink of citrus juice and in Greek and Latin to her mother Antoinette d'Aubeterre and her former tutor. Antoinette contacted the Duke of Anjou (future King Henri III (1574–1589)) and his mother Catherine de Medici for guidance. They took Quelennec's side, but they would not have her detained. Antoinette then wrote to King Charles IX and the case went before the Grand Council on 11 September 1571, after which it was referred to boards of doctors and judges. Quelennec was killed the night of 23–24 August, 1572, in the St. Bartholomew's Day massacre. Antoinette's daughter became a widow at the age of 18.

Their house was looted, but noblemen of the king saved their furniture and Antoinette's and her daughter's lives. The following year she went to the Protestant city of La Rochelle for safety away from the Massacre.

== Religion ==
John Calvin lived in Geneva from 1542 until he died in 1564 and he maintained contacts with others through correspondence. Among his correspondents were eighteen noblewomen, whose communication with Calvin provides insight into the women's role in the advancement of Protestantism in the 16th century, which led to political and military actions. Calvin needed the support of the aristocrats for change. Many of the noblewomen interested in reform, generally well educated, developed rich spiritual lives where they read Scripture and debated about theology. With Calvinism, men and women had direct relationships with God.

The popularity of Calvinism with a number of women of related French aristocratic families is important to the history of the Reform movement in France. These women frequently took the lead in "the cause", and acted as intermediaries and negotiators between leaders of the rival Catholic and Protestant factions at court. Occasionally, they participated in "subversive" activities in support of the Reform.

== French Wars of Religion ==
=== Lyon (1553) ===
In 1553, the Catholic Army surrounded and cut off the city of Lyon. Jean led the resistance, and the Catholic Army decided to end the battle by threatening Jean's wife and daughter to force him to step aside. The royal court intended to have Antoinette and her daughter Catherine stabbed to overcome Jean's resistance against the Catholics. Antoinette wrote to Jean that she would prefer to remain faithful to the cause and perish than have Jean back down. This comes from the Testament d’Antoinette d’Aubeterre, Dame de Soubise, du Parc et de Mouchamps that she made in 1570.

=== The Assassination of the Duke of Guise (1563) ===
On the eve of entering Orléans, Duke François de Guise was killed by Poltrot de Méré. When questioned, the latter denounced Théodore de Bèze, Admiral de Coligny and Jean de Parthenay. The admiral responded to these accusations but Jean de Parthenay, who was locked up in Lyon, could not add his name to the protest of 12 March 1563, signed by Châtillon, La Rochefoucauld, and De Bèze.

The presumptions against Jean de Parthenay are that during the siege of Lyon he spoke of killing de Guise. Moreover, during the siege, Jean de Parthenay sent Poltrot to Admiral de Coligny and their accusers saw in this evidence of a plot.

Antoinette d'Aubeterre hired François Viète, a jurist, as a legal adviser, who addressed suspicions of complicity by Jean V de Parthenay. In Lyon, Jean V and his lawyer researched documents about his actions. Viète also produced a summarization of Jean de Parthenay's behavior the previous year, during his administration of the city of Lyon.

== Death ==
Returning from Moulins at the beginning of the summer of 1566, Jean de Parthenay fell seriously ill. On 8 August 1566, Jean de Parthenay wrote his will and declared that he wants to be buried according to the form and manner observed by the Reformed churches of the kingdom. He died in 1566, possibly of jaundice, the same ailment from which his wife later suffered. Antoinette died in 1580.

== Family tree ==
Catherine de Partenay's family tree

Jean IV de Parthenay	Michelle de Saubonne; Dame de Soubise (1485–1549)
Jean V de Parthenay-l'archevêque; Seigneur de Mouchamps (Les Herbiers) dit Soubise (1512–1561)	Antoinette Bouchard d'Aubeterre (1535–1580); Douairière de Soubise	Isabelle d'Albret (1513-vers 1570) tante de Jeanne d'Albret	René de Rohan; Vicomte de Rohan (1516–1551)
Charles de Quelennec; Baron du Pont, dit Soubise (1548–1572)	Catherine de Parthenay de Soubise; Mère des Rohan; Douairière de Rohan (1554–1631)	René II de Rohan vicomte de Rohan (1550–1585)	Henri de Rohan vicomte de Rohan (1535–1575)	Jean de Rohan seigneur de Frontenay (died in 1574)	Françoise de Rohan dame de la Garnache (1540–1590)
Henri II de Rohan vicomte puis duc de Rohan en 1603 (1579–1638)	Benjamin de Rohan duc de Frontenay, baron de Soubise (1583–1642)	Henriette de Rohan dite la Bossue (1577–1624)	Catherine de Rohan; Mariée à Jean de Bavière (1580–1607)	Anne de Rohan; Poétesse (1584–1646)

== Bibliography ==
- Blaisdell, Charmarie Jenkins (1982). "Calvin's Letters to Women: The Courting of Ladies in High Places". The Sixteenth Century Journal. 13 (3). doi:10.2307/2539605. JSTOR 2539605.
- Bouhier, Jean (1735), Traité de la dissolution du mariage pour cause d'impuissance avec quelques pièces curieuses sur le même sujet. Relation de ce qui s'est passé au sujet de la dissolution du mariage de Charles de Quellenec, baron du Pont, avec Catherine de Parthenay [Treatise on the dissolution of marriage for reason of impotence with some curious pieces on the same subject. Account of what happened in connection with the dissolution of the marriage of Charles de Quellenec, Baron du Pont, with Catherine de Parthenay] (PDF), Jean Marie Vander Kragt au Luxembourg
- Dewald, Jonathan (2015). Status, Power, and Identity in Early Modern France: The Rohan Family 1550–1715. The Pennsylvania State University. ISBN 978-0-271-06616-5.
- Haag, Eugène (1856). La France protestante: ou, Vies des protestants français qui se sont fait un nom dans l'histoire depuis les premiers temps de la réformation jusqu'à la reconnaissance du principe de la liberté des cultes par l'Assemblée nationale; ouvrage précéde d'une notice historique sur le protestantisme en France, suivi de pièces justificatives, et rédigé sur des documents en grand partie inédits (in French). J. Cherbuliez.
- Revue des deux mondes: XLIX Année Troisième Période. Vol. 33. Paris: J. Claye – A. Quantin, Bureau de la Revue des deux mondes. 1879.
- Vray, Nicole (1998). Librairie Académique Perrin puis Éditions Ampelos (ed.). Catherine de Parthenay, duchesse de Rohan, protestante insoumise [Catherine de Parthenay, Duchess of Rohan, rebellious Protestant] (in French).
