= Catherine de Parthenay =

French noblewoman (1554–1631)

Catherine de Parthenay Viscountess and Princess of Rohan
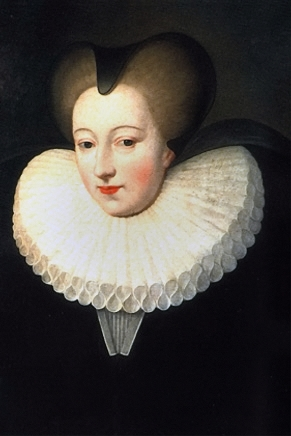
- Born: 22 March 1554; Mouchamps, Poitou, Kingdom of France
- Died: 26 October 1631 (aged 77); Château du Parc-Soubise, Mouchamps, Kingdom of France (present-day Vendée, France)
- Other names: Catherine de Parthenay-Soubise; Madame de Rohan-Soubise
- Spouses: Charles de Quelennec, baron of Pont-l'Abbé; René II, Viscount of Rohan
- Children: 6, including Henri II, Duke of Rohan; Benjamin, Duke of Soubise and Anne de Rohan
- Parents: Antoinette d'Aubeterre; Jean V of Parthenay
- Relatives: Michelle de Saubonne (grandmother); Anne de Parthenay (aunt)
- Scientific career
- Fields: Mathematics

Catherine de Parthenay, Viscountess and Princess of Rohan (1554–1631) was a French noblewoman, mathematician, philosopher, poet, playwright, and translator. She studied with the mathematician François Viète and was considered one of the most brilliant women of the era. De Parthenay was married twice, first to the Protestant baron Charles de Quelennec. During the four years of their marriage, Quelennec was often away and was reported to have dishonored his wife. After she reached out for support from Jeanne d'Albret, Queen of Navarre, he kidnapped and imprisoned her in a castle in Brittany. During the period that she was confined, her mother notified the Duke of Anjou (future King Henri III), his mother Catherine de' Medici, and ultimately King Charles IX for resolution. Quelennec died soon after. She later married René II, Viscount of Rohan.

Born into a family of ardent Huguenots, de Parthenay supported her husbands during the French Wars of Religion, losing both to battles. She followed her sons Henri and Benjamin onto the battlefield and was probably at the signing of the Edict of Nantes (1598). She was a principal figure at the famous Siege of La Rochelle, for which the Catholic army imprisoned her and her daughter Anne de Rohan at Donjon de Niort. She was said to be the "last great heroine of the French Reform movement".

Through her political plays, in the form of ballets, and a satire, de Parthenay expressed her opinions about the Huguenot cause and was bold in her criticism of Henry IV of France. She criticised him for his conversion to Catholicism and friendship with his former Catholic foes.

Her two sons and her daughter Anne were also strident Huguenots. Henri II, Duke of Rohan, became a leader of the Huguenot party. Anne and Catherine de Parthenay were considered "adroit [in] political manoeuvring and valour in defending Protestantism."

She translated Greek works into French, including Precepts to Dominique by Isocrates.

== Early life ==
Born on 22 March 1554 at Château du Parc-Soubise, Catherine de Parthenay was the daughter of Antoinette d'Aubeterre and Jean V of Parthenay. Her father, away most of her childhood, fought in the religious wars under the command of Louis I, Prince of Condé or was at the court of Charles IX of France. He died on 1 September 1566.

The de Parthenay family members were wealthy Huguenots, and since de Parthenay was an only child, she was an heiress. She was the granddaughter of Michelle de Saubonne and niece of Anne de Parthenay.

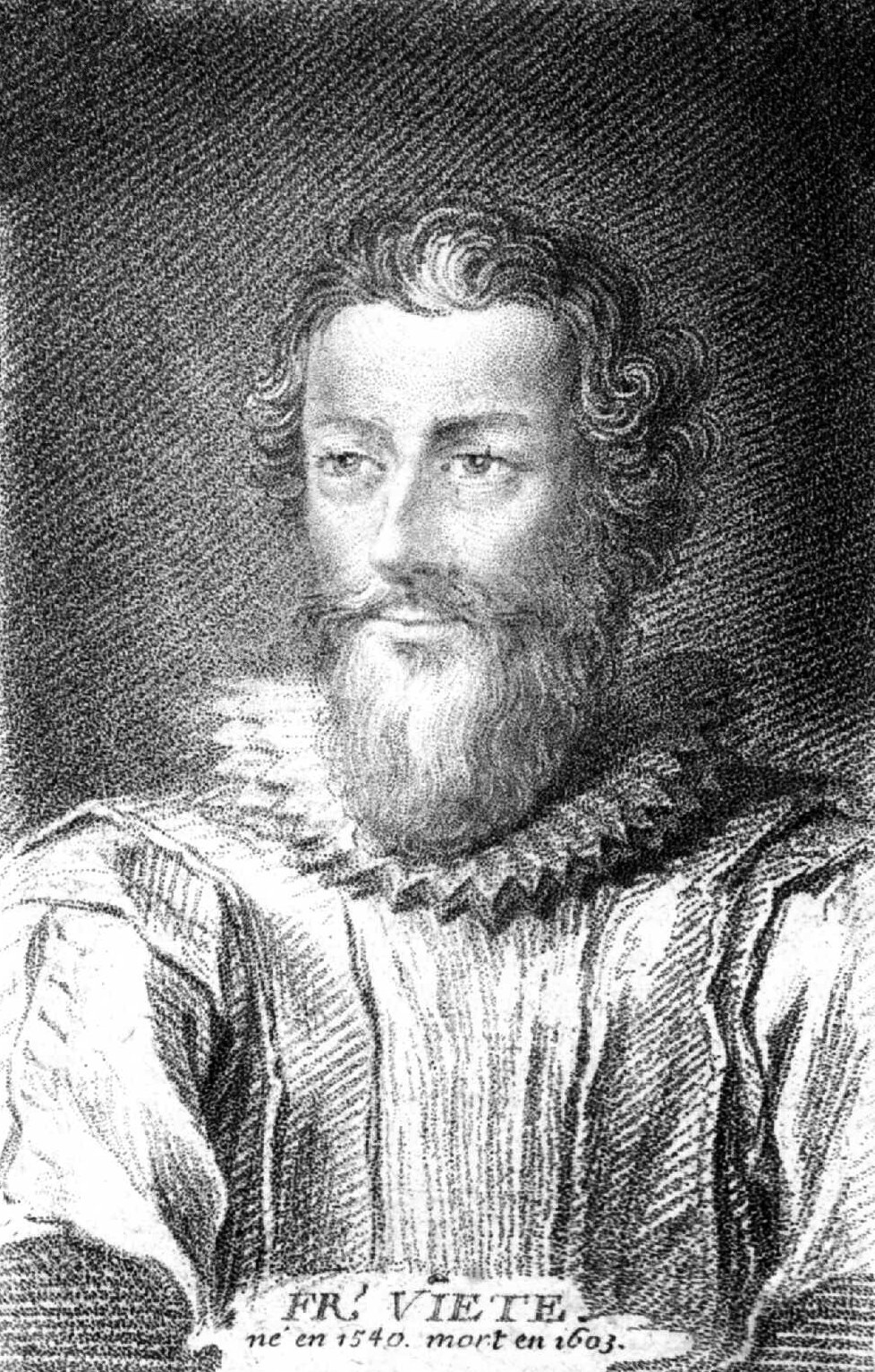
François Viète

At a young age, she showed an interest in astrology and astronomy. Her mother, Antoinette d'Aubeterre, hired François Viète, her former mathematics tutor, as her daughter's tutor. Viète co-founded modern algebra. Her mother was his patron. Viète taught Catherine geography, current discoveries, cosmographic knowledge, and mathematics. She became a mathematician. De Parthenay was an intelligent, wealthy, and attractive woman.

== Marriages and children ==
=== Charles de Quelennec ===
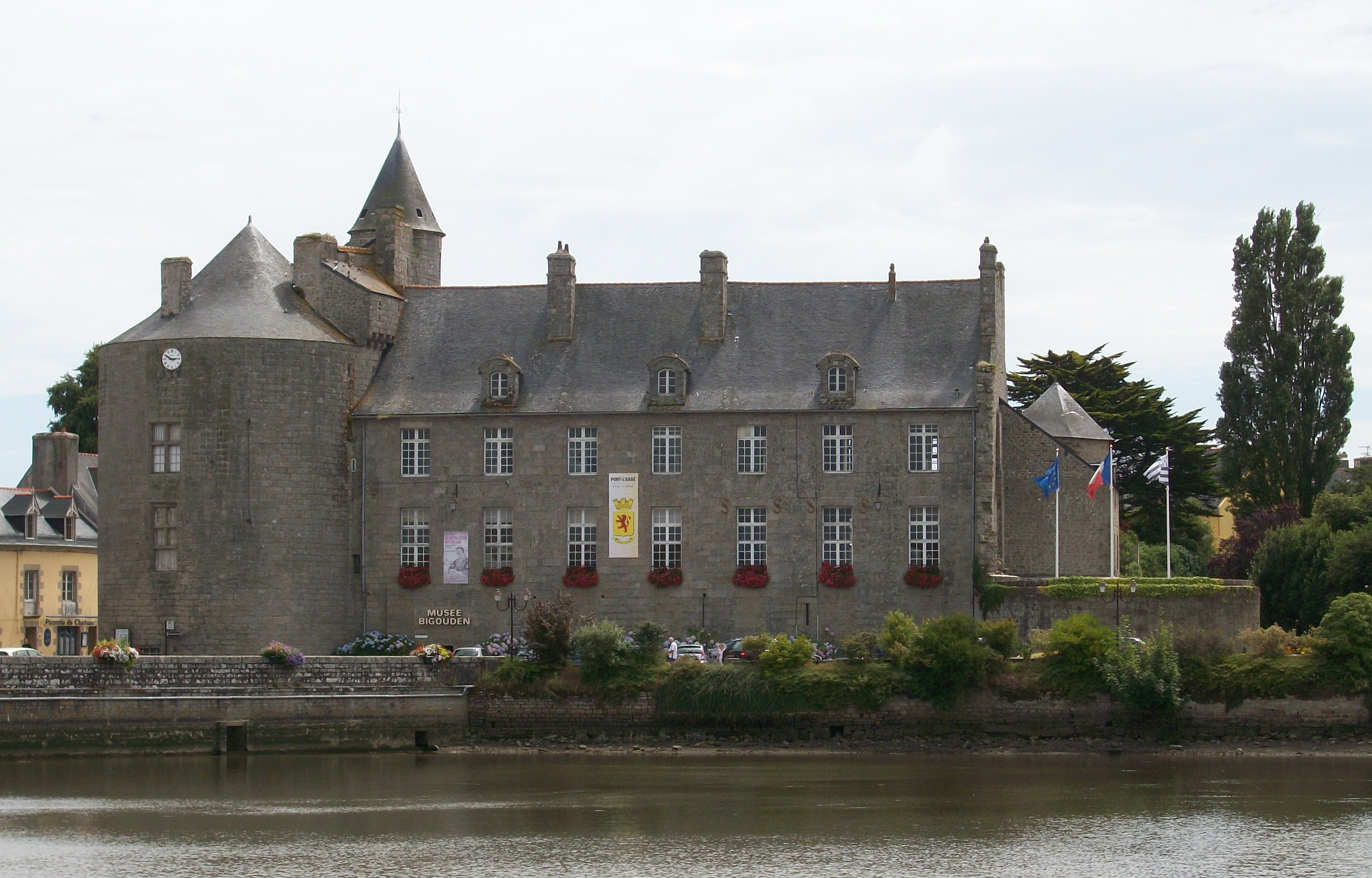
Château de Pont-l'Abbé, seat of Canton of Pont-du-Château

De Parthenay married Charles de Quelennec in 1568 (when she was about 14). He was the baron of Pont-l'Abbé, Brittany, France. Quelennec fought in the Battle of Jarnac (13 March 1569) where the Catholic army took him as a prisoner. He escaped and next fought under René of Rohan (future Viscount of Rohan). He received a severe wound to the jaw and returned to Mouchamps, where he found that his wife had fled to La Rochelle.

De Parthenay had learned from her servants that Quelennec was not honoring her. She learned from talking to Théodore de Bèze and Jeanne d'Albret, Queen of Navarre that the situation was grounds to end the marriage. Quelennec promised the Queen that he would do his husbandly duty. Instead, he imprisoned his wife at a castle in Brittany.

External image
- Letter by Catherine de Parthenay to her mother 6 September 1570 (French)

On 6 September 1570, as she was about to be kidnapped, she wrote a letter to her mother. In it, she said she was being taken against her will and could not provide the care she wanted to provide for her ill mother. She stated she was the same as she "was on the eve of my wedding and that I have always been since my birth". De Parthenay snuck letters out of the castle. They were written in invisible ink of citrus juice and in Greek and Latin to her mother Antoinette d'Aubeterre and her former tutor. Her mother contacted the Duke of Anjou (future King Henri III (1574–1589)) and his mother Catherine de Medici for guidance. They took Quelennec's side, but they would not have her detained. Aubeterre then wrote to King Charles IX and the case went before the Grand Council on 11 September 1571, after which it was referred to boards of doctors and judges.

On 23 August 1572, the St. Bartholomew's Day massacre broke out, and Quelennec fought to defend Gaspard II de Coligny, but he died at night. De Parthenay became a widow at the age of 18. De Parthenay's home was looted, but noblemen of the king saved her furniture and the lives of her mother and herself. The young widow wrote eulogies to her husband and Coligny after their deaths, but they have been lost. The following year she went to the Protestant city of La Rochelle for safety away from the Massacre.

=== René II, Viscount of Rohan ===
René of Rohan courted de Parthenay, and he wanted to marry her, but she would not accept until he had a title and inheritance. He had an older brother who died at some point, and René inherited the Rohan family's fortune and acquired the title of Viscount of Rohan. De Parthenay and Rohan married in 1575 in a private ceremony. She received the title Viscountess and Princess of Rohan after their marriage.

Their children include:

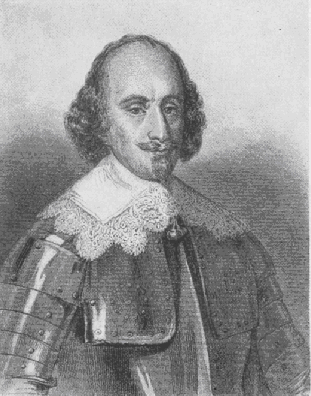
Henri II, Duke of Rohan

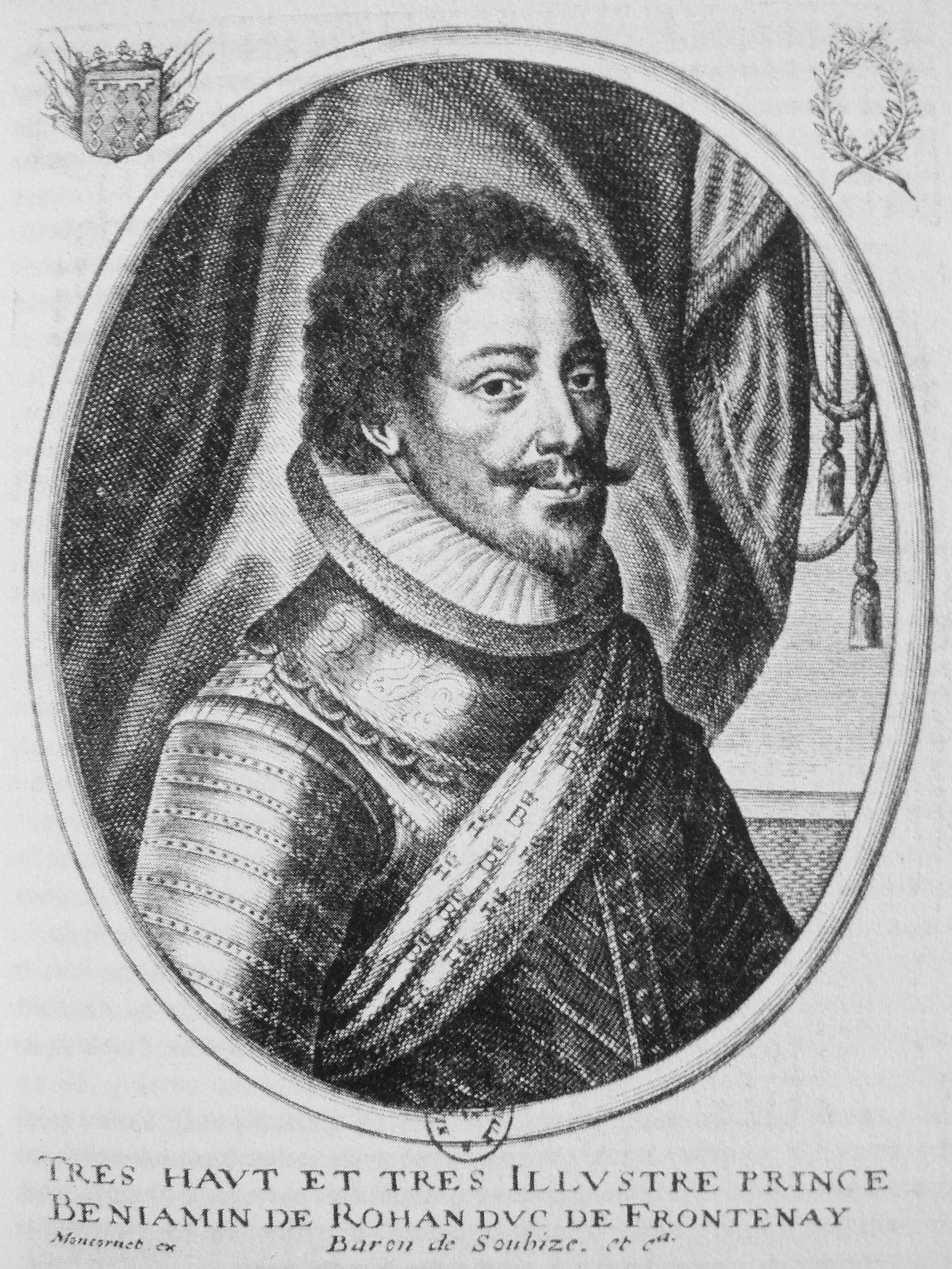
Benjamin, Duke of Soubise

- René was the first born son, who died when young.
- Henriette de Rohan (died 1629), the eldest daughter, was with her mother during the Siege of La Rochelle, and without food to eat towards the end of the Siege, de Parthenay and her daughters ate the leather from their carriage. After the war ended, she was relegated to the Château du Parc in Poitou. Henrietta never married.
- Henri II, Duke of Rohan (1579–1638) was married to Marguerite de Béthune, the eldest daughter of Maximilien de Béthune, Duke of Sully, on 7 February 1605, two years after he was made duke and a peer by Henry IV. In 1605, Henri IV accepted the marriage of Henri de Rohan and Marguerite de Béthune (aged 10), endowing them with 20,000 crowns. Henri became the leader of the Huguenot party and the last chief during the reign of Louis XIII. His Catholic daughter Marguerite, Duchess of Rohan married Henri Chabot who took on the name and arms of Rohan. Marguerite was sole heiress to his and his wife's fortune. Henri led the king's army in Valteline, and died of his severe wounds.
- Catherine de Rohan (died 1607) — Catherine of Bourbon, her godmother and the king's sister, organised her marriage to John II, Duke of Deux-Ponts. The Duke visited Henry IV at Metz, where the couple married. Bourbon died soon after. Catherine died during childbirth in 1607, three years after her marriage. She was ancestor to several famous people, among them Queen Elizabeth II.
- Benjamin, Duke of Soubise (baptised c. 1583–1642)). He was a fierce defender of the Protestant cause. He became Duke of Frontenay. When it became clear that the Huguenots would not win against the Catholics, Benjamin fled to England, where he died in 1642. Benjamin never married.
- Anne de Rohan, also Anna de Rohan, (1584–1646) was a writer and a formidable woman in the fight for Calvinism, "the Rohan women were known for adroit political manoeuvring and valour in defending Protestantism." Anne never married.

Rohan and de Parthenay were active and brave supporters of the Huguenots and fought the Catholic army throughout the French Wars of Religion. When needed, de Parthenay and her children sought shelter in La Rochelle. Her husband died in La Rochelle on 27 April 1586 due to wounds he acquired during battle.

De Parthenay's daughters were part of a welcoming procession for Marie de' Medici in 1600.

== Activities in service of the war ==
She gave her children a good education and readied them for adulthood. After Rohan's death, de Parthenay lived in Blain and Parc Soubise at Mouchamps. She was an active leader of the religious, political, and cultural circles in France. De Parthenay was a member of an elite religious group. She moved around, depending upon the location and activities of the Catholic army units. Sometimes François Viète joined her at Mouchamps. He said of her,

It is to you, august daughter of Mélusine, that I owe above all my studies in mathematics, to which your love for this science prompted me, the very great knowledge that you possess of it, and even this knowledge in all science that one cannot admire too much in a woman of so royal and noble stock.

— Dedication of L'Isagoge by François Viète

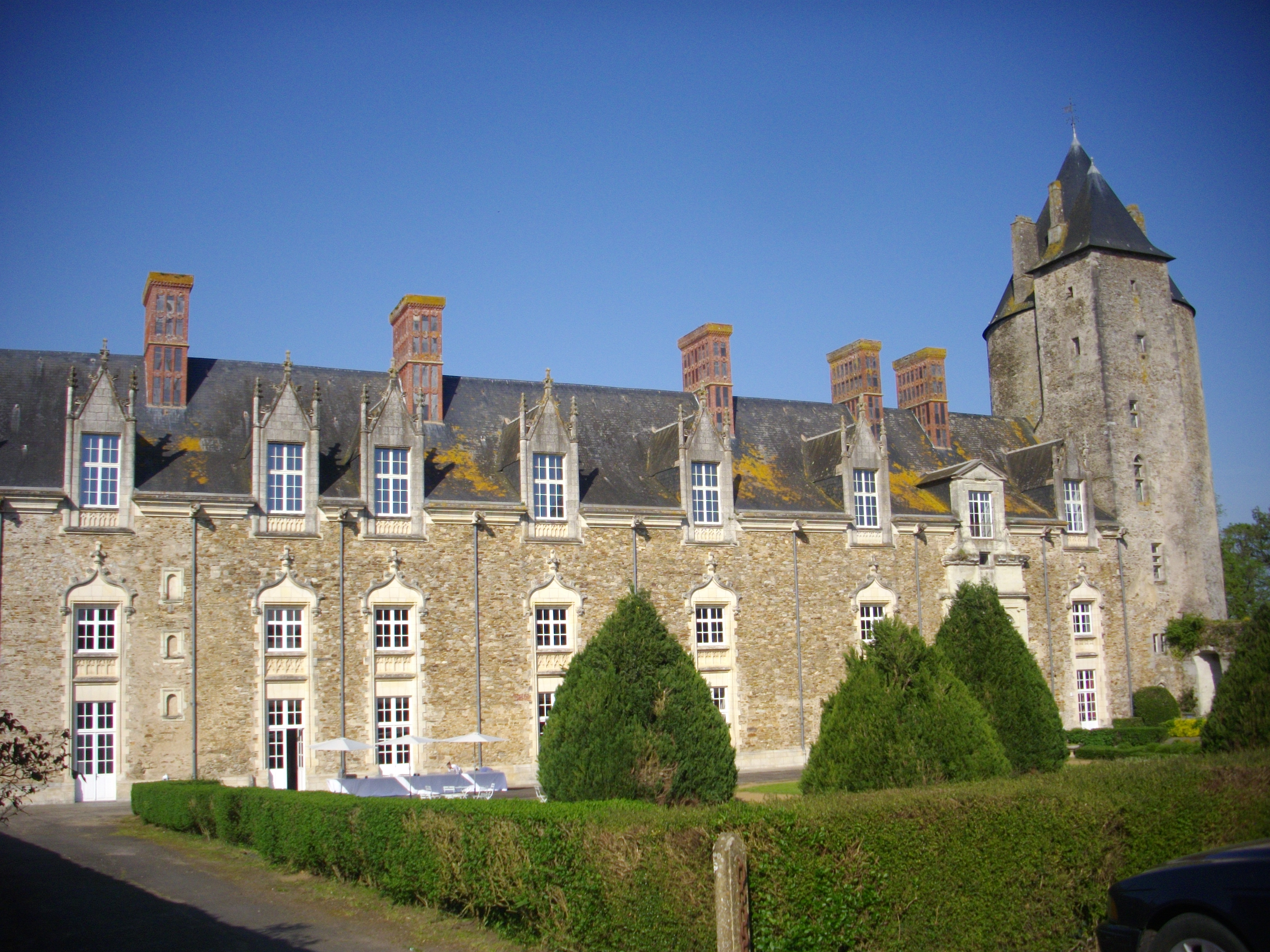
Château de Blain

During the wars, the Château de Blain was besieged and set on fire in 1591 during fighting between the Duke of Mercœur and Jean de Montauban, the knight De Goust. De Parthenay restored Château de Blain and moved into it with her family.

De Parthenay followed her sons Henri and Benjamin onto the battlefield. She probably attended the signing of the Edict of Nantes (1598).

=== Encrypted war correspondence ===
External image
- Lettres de Catherine de Parthenay, dame de Rohan-Soubise (French)

During the French Wars of Religion, a circle of Huguenot leaders encrypted their letters with numerical codes about military or political topics. Women, like de Parthenay, passed on intelligence, which created "a highly successful network of information." Sometimes their correspondence was seized, as in the case of Elisabeth, Duchess of Bouillon, who said in a letter to her sister Charlotte Arbaleste Duplessis-Mornay that their letters were being intercepted and forwarded to the commander of the Châtelet. De Parthenay corresponded with Charlotte Duplessis-Mornay and her husband Philippe du Plessis Mornay, who was a regular correspondent. In 1597, she wrote to Charlotte Arbaleste Duplessis-Mornay about her conversation with Henry IV. De Parthenay may have learned to code letters from François Viète, who was an expert cryptologist.

=== War-themed works ===
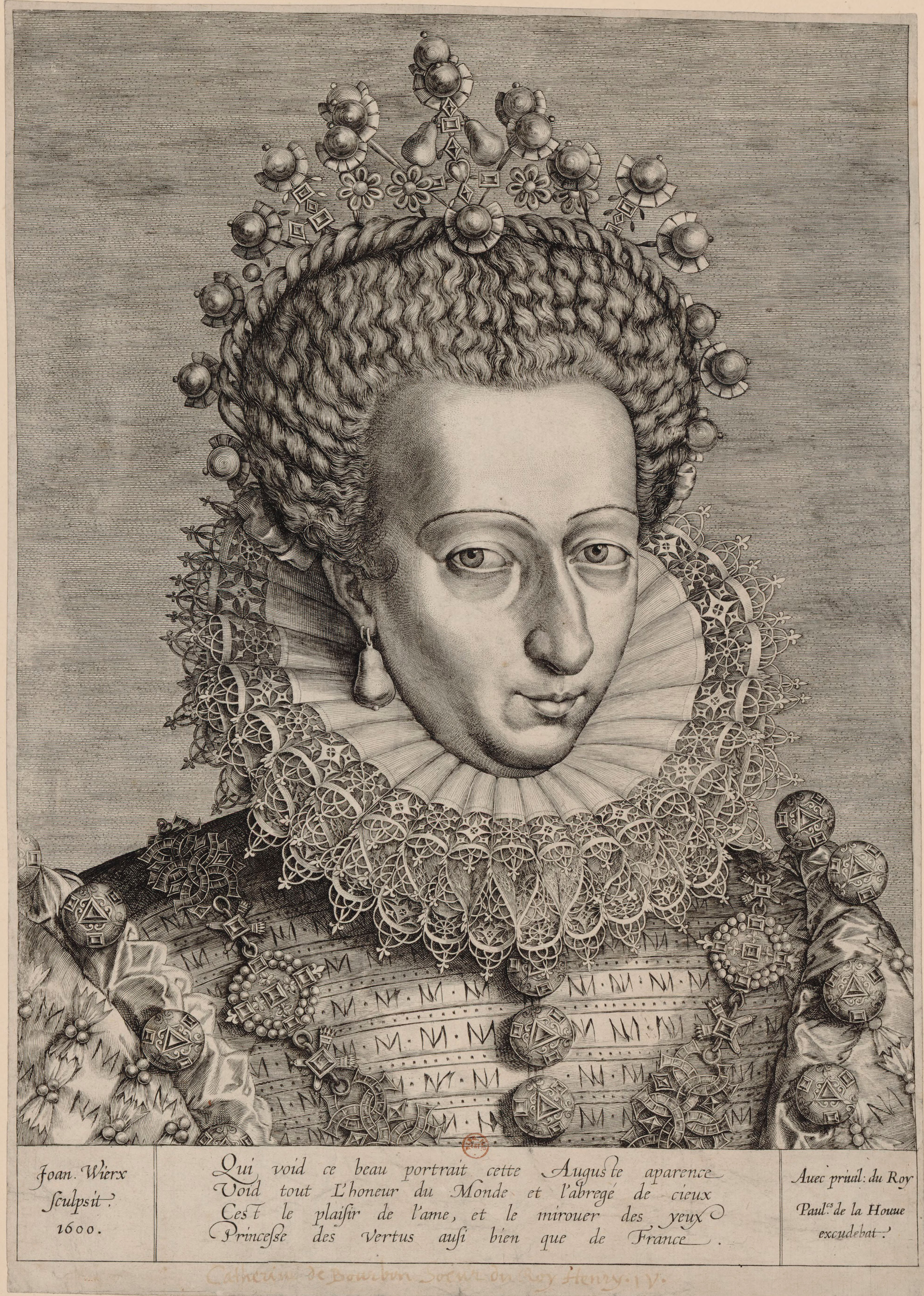
Catherine of Bourbon, sister of Henri IV of France

De Parthenay enjoyed visiting the court of Henry IV and his sister Catherine of Bourbon, one of her closest friends, in Tours. There, she wrote tragedy and poetry. De Parthenay and her children performed in the plays in Pau and Tours (between 1592 and 1593). She wrote three political plays in the form of ballets to call for an end to the religious wars. Written for her friend Catherine de Bourbon, one of the works was Madame au Chateau de Pau le 23 aoust 1592 (Madame at the Chateau de Pau on August 23, 1592). She also wrote Au Balet de Madame (At Madame's Ballet), and Autre Balet (Other Ballet). De Parthenay wrote the first two with messages for Henry IV because she was discouraged that the king converted to Catholicism, favored his former Catholic enemies, and prohibited his sister Catherine from marrying Charles de Bourbon, Count of Soissons. One of the plays concluded by the intervention of Mercury, representing Jupiter, and the triumph of Love over the nymphs. The third other ballet, Médée, was about the magician Medea and Sibyl.

De Parthenay also wrote the satire Apologie pour le roi Henri IV envers ceux qui le blasment de ce qu ’il gratifie plus ses ennemis que ses serviteurs (Apology for King Henry IV towards those who blaspheme him for gratifying his enemies more than his servants) in 1596. The pamphlet, which also lamented the treatment of Catherine de Bourbon, was published anonymously.

=== Resumption of hostilities ===
Henri IV was assassinated in 1610, after which de Parthenay wrote a famous eulogy to the king, Stances sur la mort du Roy. Marie de' Medici, the king's widow, became the Queen Regent of France, which strengthened the power of the monarchy as well as Cardinal Richelieu, thereby weakening the Protestant's position. Her sons were angry about the changes, and Parthenay sought to appease them. They later reconciled with Marie de' Medici. Parthenay communicated with Philippe du Plessis Mornay in secret correspondence to strategise for the Huguenot cause. Their correspondence ceased due to illness and after Duplessis-Mornay's rejection by his sons. She also corresponded with Countess Charlotte Brabantina of Nassau about political challenges.

=== Siege of La Rochelle ===
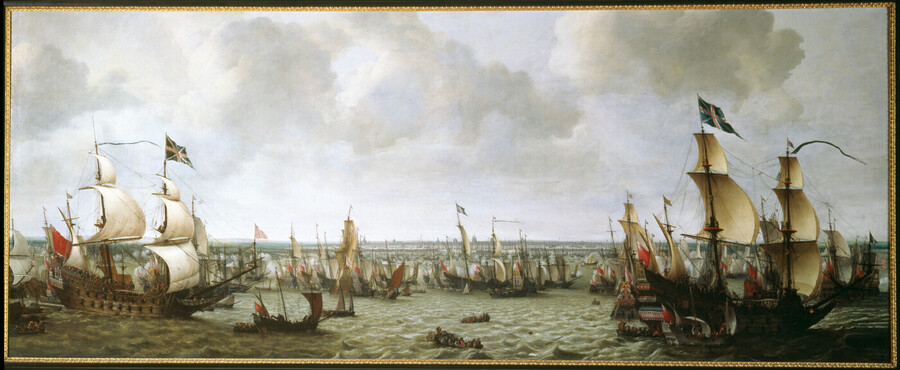
Abraham de Verwer, The Failed attempt by the English fleet to relieve La Rochelle, 1628, Het Scheepvaartmuseum, Amsterdam

Beginning in 1626, de Parthenay and her daughter Anne lived at the Hotel de Marsan in La Rochelle, a Huguenot stronghold, safe from the court's orders to have her arrested. Her son arrived later with an English fleet that came to La Rochelle to negotiate peace with France on behalf of England. The mayor refused to allow the negotiator or Benjamin to enter the city. De Parthenay found her son at Porte Saint-Nicholas and took his hand as she said so the mayor and others could hear the conversation,

Come, my son, follow me without fear, with all those who are with you; all good people rejoice at your coming, and will rejoice even more when they consider how affectionate you have been for the freedom of the city which they hope to recover by the arms of the King of England, which you have had. The house of Rohan will always want the good of La Rochelle, and will procure it as much as possible.

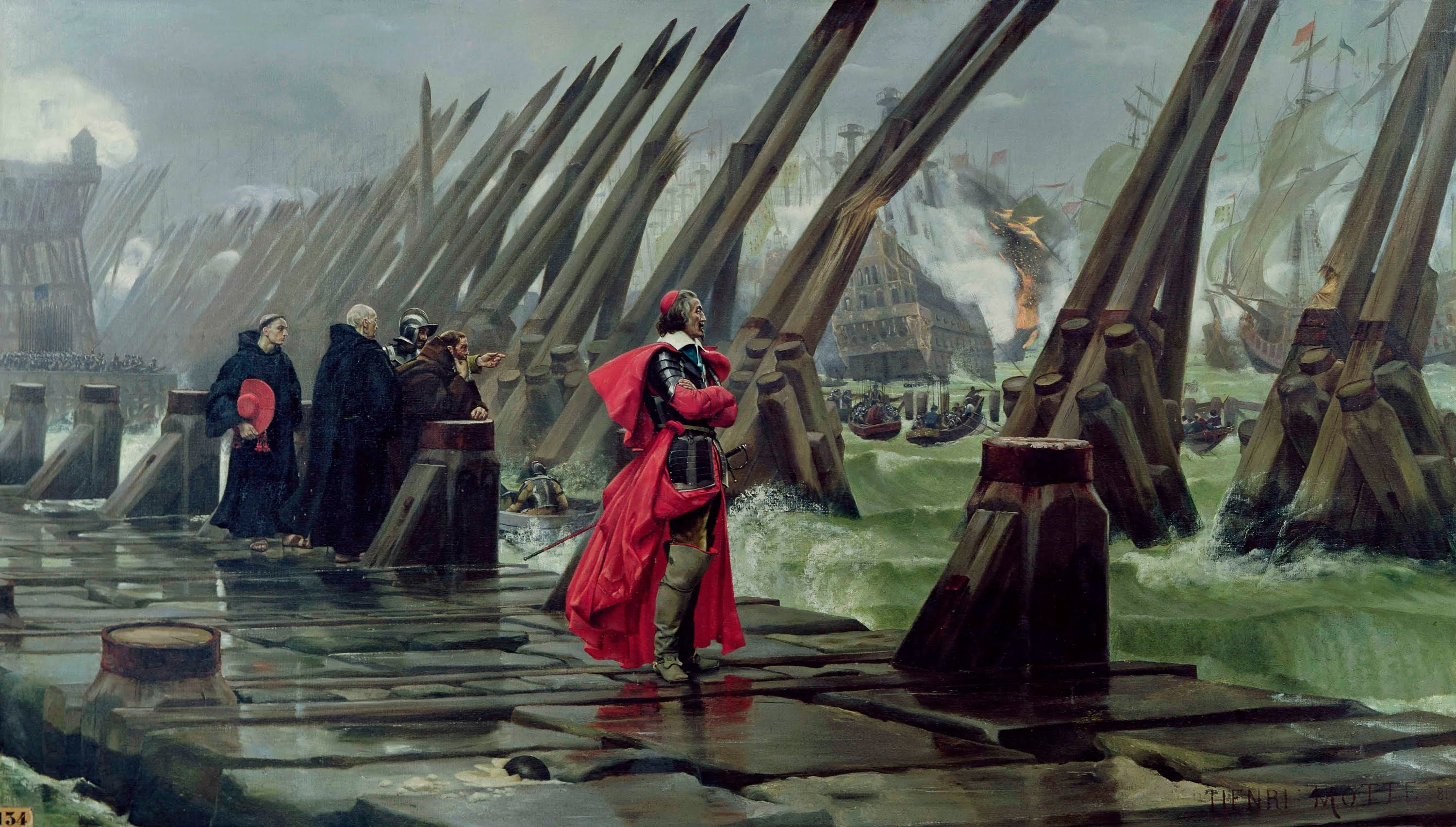
Cardinal Richelieu on the Sea Wall of La Rochelle at the time of the Siege

The mother and son freely entered the La Rochelle without opposition from the mayor and to the cheers of the residents. Although they had hoped against it, the city's residents realised at that time there would be a fight between the Huguenot residents and the French royal army. Cardinal Richelieu's armies positioned themselves around La Rochelle in August 1627, leading up to the Siege of the city (beginning 10 September 1627).

The Siege lasted 16 months, during which 75% of the defenders died of starvation. Anne and her mother survived on a daily ration of four ounces of bread and horsemeat towards the end of the war. They were lauded as "indomitable heroines of the ruthless 16-month Siege of La Rochelle".

On 1 November 1628, La Rochelle surrendered. Richelieu ordered the arrest of only two women, Anne and Catherine de Parthenay, for their efforts to lead the Huguenots. The Catholics imprisoned them at the medieval castle Donjon de Niort. De Parthenay's residences in Josselin and Blain in Brittany were razed by the Catholic army as ordered by Cardinal Richelieu to eliminate their military role. De Parthenay and her daughter were released after four months in captivity. On 16 June 1629, the Peace of Alès treaty was signed.

Meanwhile, in 1628, Henri II, Duke of Rohan became the leader of the Protestant princes.

== Translator ==
Her first translation was the Greek Precepts to Dominique by Isocrates into French. While in the Protestant city of La Rochelle in 1573, she wrote Holopherne, which has been lost.

== Death ==
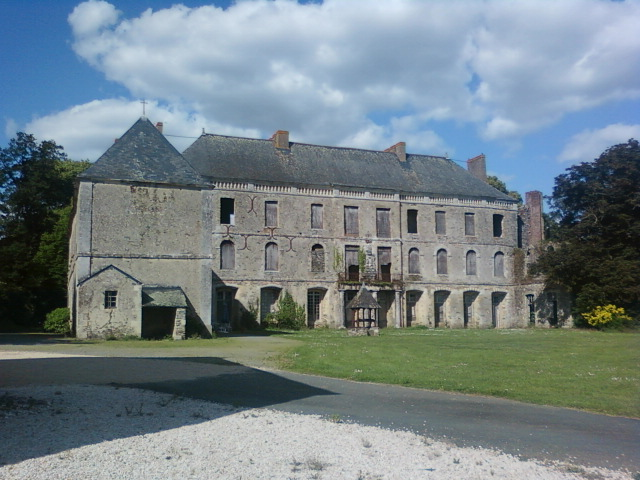
Château du Parc-Soubise

De Parthenay died at her Parc Soubise home on 26 October 1631. Anne R. Larsen stated that she was the "last great heroine of the French Reform movement" and she was similarly described as the "last of the Huguenot heroines." The Huguenot rebellions (1621–1628), were sometimes called the Rohan Wars.

Her daughter Anne expressed her deep feelings of loss following the death of her mother on 26 October 1631 in the poem "Plaintes de mademoiselle Anne de Rohan: A la mort de sa mère" ("Complaints of Miss Anne de Rohan: On the death of her mother"). It was published in the Bulletin of the Society for the History of French Protestantism.

== Family tree ==
Catherine de Partenay's family tree

Jean IV de Parthenay	Michelle de Saubonne; Dame de Soubise (1485–1549)
Jean V de Parthenay-l'archevêque; Seigneur de Mouchamps (Les Herbiers) dit Soubise (1512–1561)	Antoinette Bouchard d'Aubeterre (1535–1580); Douairière de Soubise	Isabelle d'Albret (1513-vers 1570) tante de Jeanne d'Albret	René de Rohan; Vicomte de Rohan (1516–1551)
Charles de Quelennec; Baron du Pont, dit Soubise (1548–1572)	Catherine de Parthenay de Soubise; Mère des Rohan; Douairière de Rohan (1554–1631)	René II de Rohan vicomte de Rohan (1550–1585)	Henri de Rohan vicomte de Rohan (1535–1575)	Jean de Rohan seigneur de Frontenay (died in 1574)	Françoise de Rohan dame de la Garnache (1540–1590)
Henri II de Rohan vicomte puis duc de Rohan en 1603 (1579–1638)	Benjamin de Rohan duc de Frontenay, baron de Soubise (1583–1642)	Henriette de Rohan dite la Bossue (1577–1624)	Catherine de Rohan; Mariée à Jean de Bavière (1580–1607)	Anne de Rohan; Poétesse (1584–1646)

== Bibliography ==
- Bouhier, Jean (1735), Traité de la dissolution du mariage pour cause d'impuissance avec quelques pièces curieuses sur le même sujet. Relation de ce qui s'est passé au sujet de la dissolution du mariage de Charles de Quellenec, baron du Pont, avec Catherine de Parthenay [Treatise on the dissolution of marriage for reason of impotence with some curious pieces on the same subject. Account of what happened in connection with the dissolution of the marriage of Charles de Quellenec, Baron du Pont, with Catherine de Parthenay] (PDF), Jean Marie Vander Kragt au Luxembourg
- Larsen, Anne R. (2016). Anna Maria van Schurman, 'the star of Utrecht' : the educational vision and reception of a savante. Ashgate. ISBN 978-1-4724-6334-0.
- Vray, Nicole (1998). Librairie Académique Perrin puis Éditions Ampelos (ed.). Catherine de Parthenay, duchesse de Rohan, protestante insoumise [Catherine de Parthenay, Duchess of Rohan, rebellious Protestant] (in French).
