= Anne de Rohan (poétesse) =

French poet

- Born: 1584
- Died: 1646 (Age 62); Germany
- Other names: Anna de Rohan; Anne de Rohan-Soubise; Protestant Princess Anne de Rohan
- Occupations: Huguenot leader and fighter, poet
- Parent(s): Catherine de Parthenay and René II, Viscount of Rohan
- Relatives: Henri, Duke of Rohan (brother), Benjamin, Duke of Soubise (brother)

Anne de Rohan, also known as Anne de Rohan-Soubise (1584–1646), was a French Huguenot poet and a leader in the fight for Calvinism. Rohan and her mother Catherine de Parthenay were principal figures at the famous Siege of La Rochelle. At the end of which, the Catholic army imprisoned Anne and her mother at Donjon de Niort.

"The Rohan women were known for adroit political manoeuvring and valour in defending Protestantism." Rohan was also a member of an elite group of European scholars, some of whom remained unmarried to pursue their intellectual interests.

== Early years ==
Rohan, born in 1584, was the daughter of Catherine de Parthenay and René II, Viscount of Rohan. Her siblings were René, a brother who died young; Henrietta; Henri II, Duke of Rohan; Catherine de Rohan; and Benjamin, Duke of Soubise. Her education included classical and modern literature.

== Scholar ==
She was among a circle of accomplished friends who corresponded with Anna Maria van Schurman. Rohan and the multi-lingual van Schurman conversed in French, including Rohan honoring van Schurman's request to resolve the origin of a request — the queen (Anne of Austria) or Charles du Chesne — to translate Dissertatio (1641) in 1643, and avoid offending the queen.

Van Schurman and Rohan chose to remain unmarried, as did others — René Descartes, Galileo Galilei, and John Locke — who pursued scholarly vocations. Pierre Gassendi warned other scholars that families required too much attention, which diverted their attention and made it difficult to make a good living. Nicolas-Claude Fabri de Peiresc also stated that having a family meant there would be little time to meet with learned men. Other learned 17th-century women who chose not to marry were Madeleine de Scudéry, Marie de Gournay, Elisabeth of the Palatinate, Mary Astell, and Christina, Queen of Sweden.

=== Poet ===
A collection of her works, Poèmes d'Anne de Rohan-Soubise was published in 1816. A notable poem is Sur une dame nommée bien-aimée (On a Lady Named Beloved), written in 1617. It may have been the first poem about Sappho by a French woman. Rohan writes of her love for a woman, using the French aimee, to describe the object of her affection.

== French Wars of Religion ==
Anne was a French Huguenot who fought against the Catholics during the French Wars of Religion.

=== Siege at La Rochelle ===
Beginning in 1626, Anne and her mother lived at the Hotel de Marsan in La Rochelle, a Huguenot stronghold, safe from the court's orders to have her mother arrested.

The Siege lasted 16 months, during which 75% of the defenders died of starvation. Anne and her mother survived on a daily ration of four ounces of bread and horsemeat towards the end of the war. Anne and Catherine de Parthenay were lauded as "indomitable heroines of the ruthless 16-month Siege of La Rochelle".

On 1 November 1628, La Rochelle surrendered. Richelieu ordered the arrest of only two women, Anne and her mother, for their efforts to lead the Huguenots. The Catholic army imprisoned them at the medieval castle Donjon de Niort and razed Parthenay's residences in Josselin and Blain in Brittany. Anne and her mother were released after four months in captivity. On 16 June 1629, the Peace of Alès treaty was signed.

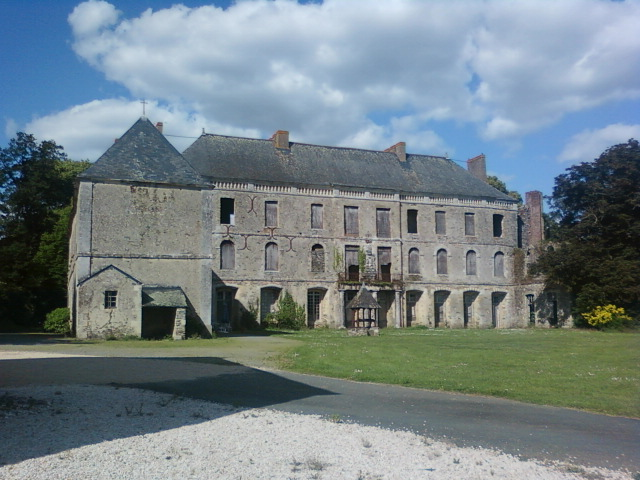
Chateau de Parc Soubise

Her mother, Catherine de Parthenay, died at her Parc Soubise home on 26 October 1631. She is also said to have died while imprisoned. Anne expressed her deep feelings of loss following the death of her mother on 26 October 1631 in the poem Plaintes de mademoiselle Anne de Rohan: A la mort de sa mère (Complaints of Miss Anne de Rohan: On the death of her mother). It was published with other poems that she wrote in the Bulletin of the Society for the History of French Protestantism.

== Legacy ==
Anne R. Larsen, author of Anna Maria van Schurman, 'the star of Utrecht' : the educational vision and reception of a savante says of Rohan,

Anne de Rohan is a striking example of both a Calvinist femme forte and a savante, who not only performed in the political arena but also developed a textual voice through her numerous published writings.

Larsen further commented about Anne and 16th-century Huguenot writers,

Catherine Randall theorizes that Calvinist women writers circumvented the intense resistance to female expression in Huguenot culture through two strategies of legitimation: they identified themselves with their household performative roles to the point of “hyper-domestication’; and they fashioned in their writings a female textual ‘community of discussants’ in which they modelled themselves as exemplars, drawing on the Protestant doctrine of the priesthood of believers.’° These strategies of household identification and textual exchange with other women, present as well in the writings of women of other religious traditions — Catholic, Anglican, Lutheran, and Puritan — are helpful when considering the epistolary exchange between [Anne de] Rohan and [Anna Maria] van Schurman.

== Bibliography ==
- Larsen, Anne R. (2016). Anna Maria van Schurman, 'the star of Utrecht' : the educational vision and reception of a savante. Ashgate. ISBN 978-1-4724-6334-0.
