= Château du Parc-Soubise =

Château in Pays de la Loire, France

Coordinates: 46°48′25″N 1°5′14″W

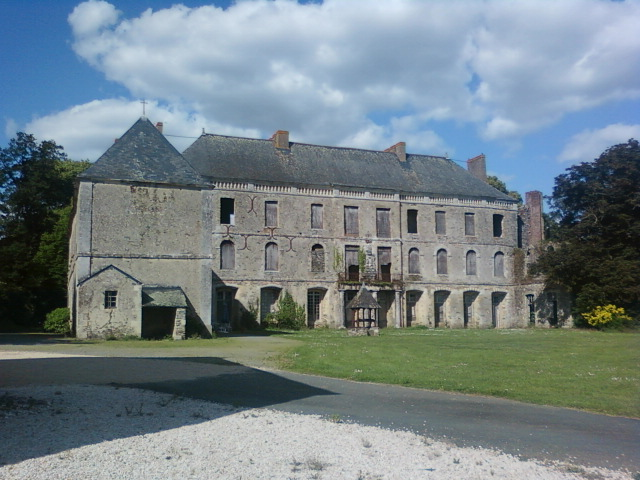
Chateau du Parc Soubise (fr)

The Château du Parc-Soubise near Mouchamps in Pays de la Loire, France. It was built in the 16th or 17th century but among the outbuildings, there is a barn from the 14th century. A multiple-level building was used as a salting-house and a granary. The château, located between a lake and a forest, is 3 kilometres (1.9 miles) southeast of Vendrennes off of Mouchamps road.

The château had belonged to the Rohan-Soubise family, such as when it was a residence of René II, Viscount of Rohan and his wife Catherine de Parthenay, key leaders of the religious, political, and cultural circles during the French Wars of Religion (1562 to 1598).

Henry IV stayed at the castle in 1589. He tried to seduce Anne de Rohan and when he asked where her bedroom was, she evidently said, "Through the chapel, your Majesty!"

During the religious wars, the Château de Blain was besieged and set on fire in 1591 during fighting between the Duke of Mercœur and Jean de Montauban, the knight De Goust. The Château de Blain was restored by Parthenay, who installed herself there with her children. Blain was razed about the time of the Siege of La Rochelle and when Parthenay and her daughter Anne were imprisoned and released after four months in captivity.

An architect restored the mansion in 1780, but before anyone could reside in the building it was set on fire by the infernal columns (War in the Vendée (1793 to 1796) of the French Revolution). They slaughtered 200 people at the site and burned down the castle.
Returning from exile, the Count of Chabot decided to keep the castle as it was, in memory of these tragic events. It has never been restored since, apart from its roof which protects the ruins.
