= Charles de Quelennec =

- Born: 1548
- Died: 24 August 1572 (aged 23–24); Paris, France
- Other name: Charles de Quellennec
- Spouse: Catherine de Parthenay (m. 1568; died 1572)

Charles de Quelennec (1548–1572) was a French Protestant and the baron of Pont-l'Abbé, Brittany, France.

He married Catherine de Parthenay in 1568. Quelennec fought in the Battle of Jarnac (1569) and was taken prisoner and escaped. He next fought under René of Rohan and he was wounded.

Parthenay heard from servants that Quelennec dishonored her and was told by Théodore de Bèze and Jeanne d'Albret, Queen of Navarre that it was grounds for dissolution of their marriage. Guidance and resolution of the case was sought of the royal family, including King Charles IX of France. Meanwhile, Quelennec imprisoned Parthenay in a castle in Brittany.

On 23 August 1572, the St. Bartholomew's Day massacre broke out and Quelennec fought to defend Gaspard II de Coligny, but he died during the night. Pathenay became a widow at the age of 18.

== Baron of Pont-l'Abbé ==
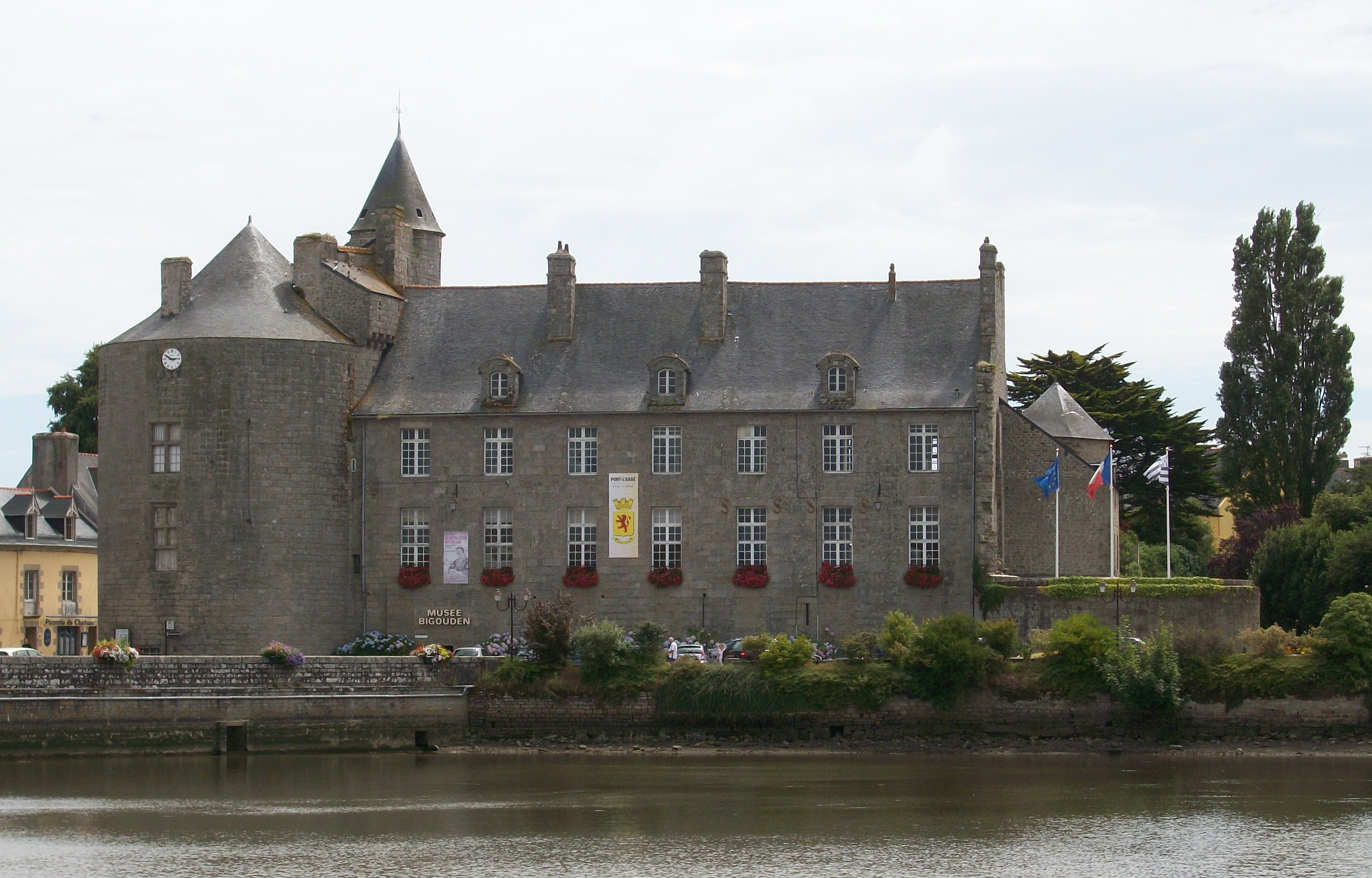
Château de Pont-l'Abbé, seat of Canton of Pont-du-Château

Charles de Quelennec was the baron of Pont-l'Abbé, Brittany, France.

== Battle of Jarnac ==
Quelennec fought in the Battle of Jarnac (13 March 1569) and was taken prisoner. He escaped and next fought under René of Rohan, where he was seriously wounded in the jaw. He returned to Mouchamps, where he found that his wife had fled to La Rochelle.

== Marriage ==
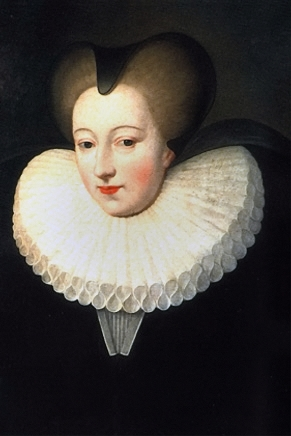
Catherine de Parthenay

Quelennec married Catherine de Parthenay in 1568 when she was a young lady.

Parthenay had learned from her servants that Quelennec was not honoring her and she found out from talking to Théodore de Bèze and Jeanne d'Albret, Queen of Navarre that the situation was grounds to end the marriage. Quelennec promised the Queen that he would do his husbandly duty, but instead he ordered for his wife to be imprisoned at a castle in Brittany.

On September 6, 1570, as she was about to be kidnapped, she wrote a "to whom it may concern" letter to her mother. In it, she said that she was being taken away against her will and therefore could not provide the care she wanted to for her ill mother. She states that she "was on the eve of my wedding, and that I have always been since my birth". Parthenay snuck letters out of the castle. They were written in invisible ink of citrus juice and in Greek and Latin, to her mother Antoinette d'Aubeterre and her former tutor. Her mother contacted the Duke of Anjou (future King Henri III (1574-1589)) and his mother Catherine de Medici for guidance. They took Quelennec's side, but they would not have her detained. Aubeterre then wrote to King Charles IX and the case went before the Grand Council on 11 September 1571, after which the case was referred to a board of doctors and then judges.

== St. Bartholomew's Day massacre ==
On 23 August 1572, the St. Bartholomew's Day massacre broke out and Quelennec fought to defend Gaspard II de Coligny, but he died during the night. Parthenay became a widow at the age of 18. Their home was looted but the furniture and the lives of Parthenay and her mother were saved by noblemen of the king. The young widow wrote eulogies to her husband and Coligny after their deaths, but they were lost.

== Bibliography ==
- Bouhier, Jean (1735), Traité de la dissolution du mariage pour cause d'impuissance avec quelques pièces curieuses sur le même sujet. Relation de ce qui s'est passé au sujet de la dissolution du mariage de Charles de Quellenec, baron du Pont, avec Catherine de Parthenay [Treatise on the dissolution of marriage for reason of impotence with some curious pieces on the same subject. Account of what happened in connection with the dissolution of the marriage of Charles de Quellenec, Baron du Pont, with Catherine de Parthenay] (PDF), Jean Marie Vander Kragt au Luxembourg
- Vray, Nicole (1998). Librairie Académique Perrin puis Éditions Ampelos (ed.). Catherine de Parthenay, duchesse de Rohan, protestante insoumise (in French). Paris.
