= Benjamin Fillon =

French numismatist and archaeologist

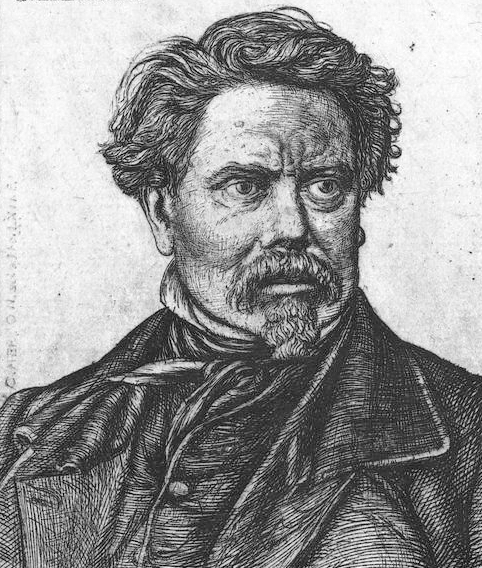
- Born: 15 March 1819; Grues, Vendée, France
- Died: 23 May 1881 (aged 62); Saint-Cyr-en-Talmondais, France

Benjamin Fillon (15 March 1819 – 23 May 1881) was a French numismatist and archaeologist. Much of his lifetime's work was devoted to researching the French mathematician, Franciscus Vieta, a key figure in developing new algebra.

== Biography ==
Son of Joseph Louis Fillon (1787-1858), tax collector, former officer of the First French Empire, and Joséphine Joussemet, he came from a lower middle-class family in Fontenay-le-Comte. During the French Revolution, she was one of the War in the Vendée.

His father was a nephew of Colonel Louis Joseph Fillon, who was killed on May 25, 1793. Father Ballard, deputy of the clergy of Poitou in 1789 and one of the first priests to join the Third Estate before sitting in the National Constituent Assembly (France), was one of his great-uncles.

His law studies took him to Poitiers, then to Paris, where he began his research and collections, which would cover many fields: Gallic and Gallo-Roman archaeology, ceramics, the French Renaissance, French numismatics, local history, and more.

In 1841, Fillon began his first work at the Société des Antiquaires de l’Ouest (Western Antiquarian Society), becoming its quaestor in 1844 and then vice-president in 1846.

After graduating with a law degree on April 19, 1842, he was appointed deputy judge at the court of La Roche-sur-Yon that same year. A liberal, progressive, and loyal supporter of the Republic, he resigned from his position after the coup d'état of December 2, 1851.

In 1848, he was the Republican candidate for the Vendée department in the election for the Constituent National Assembly, but was not elected.

== Main works ==
- Considérations historiques et artistiques sur les monnaies de France
- Poitou et Vendée
- Considérations historiques et artistiques sur les monnaies de France
- Études Numismatiques

On February 10, 1863, he married his first cousin Clémentine (born in Nalliers on February 27, 1830), daughter of Joseph René Fillon, notary, and Pauline Victoire Poëy d'Avant, and niece of the famous numismatist Faustin Poëy d'Avant; she collaborated on his work.
