= Donjon de Niort =

Medieval castle in the French town of Niort

Coordinates: 46°19′32″N 0°27′54″W

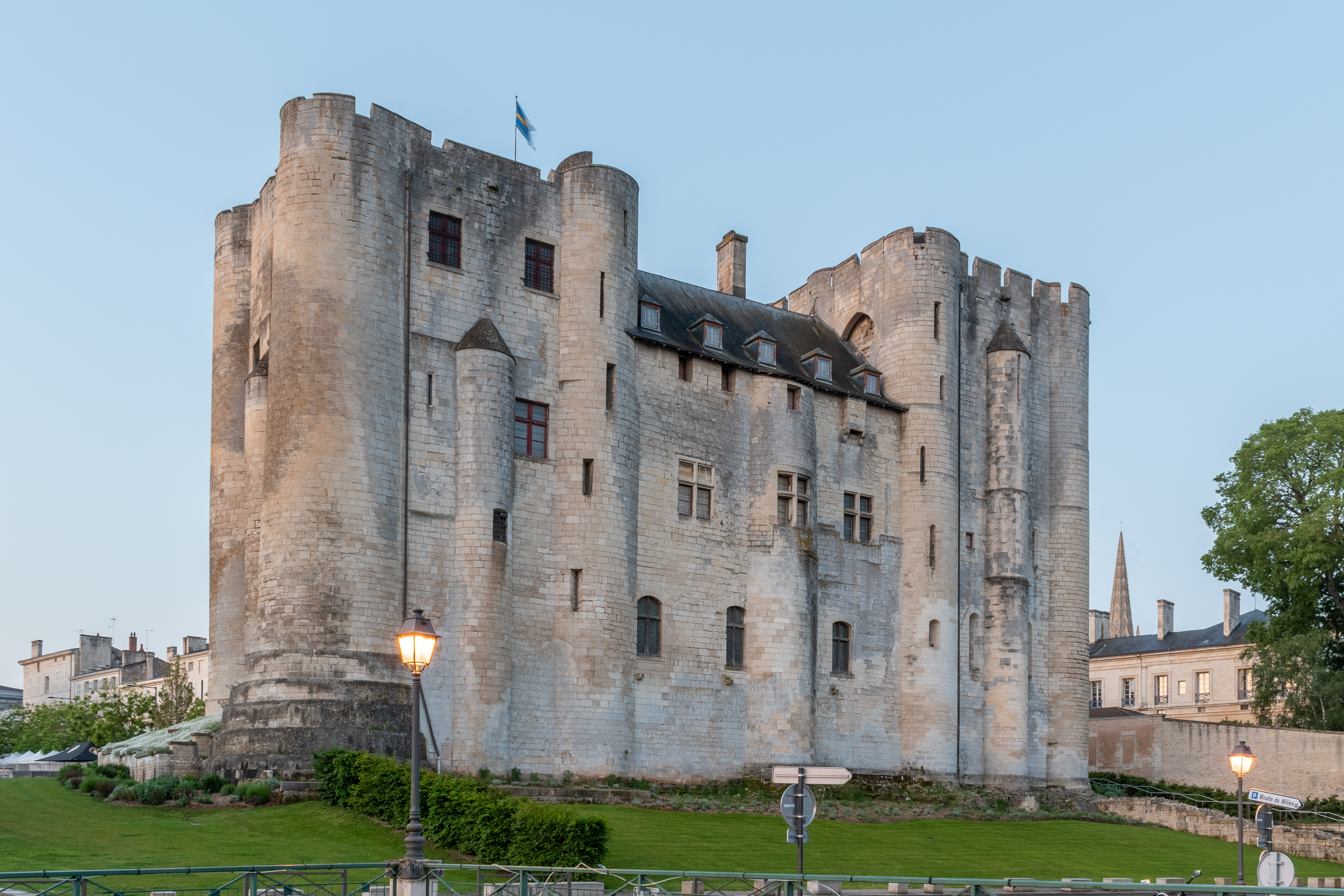
Château de Niort

The Donjon de Niort or Château de Niort (the former is most often used today) is a medieval castle in the French town of Niort in the département of Deux-Sèvres. It consists of two square towers, linked by a 15th-century building and dominates the Sèvre Niortaise valley.

The two donjons are the only remaining part of the castle. The castle was started by Henry II Plantagenet and completed by Richard the Lionheart. It was defended by a rectangular curtain wall and was damaged during the Wars of Religion. In the 18th century, the castle served as a prison.

== Origins of the present castle ==
Following Henry II's marriage to Eleanor of Aquitaine, the English Crown controlled most of western France. Needing a secure base from which to maintain links with England, Niort was strategically placed as a site where Henry could maintain a garrison and supplies of personnel and weapons. He chose a site on the banks of the Sèvre on an earlier site. (Historians differ over the attribution; a recent hypothesis suggest that Henry's son Richard the Lionheart may have been responsible.)

== Description ==
The present keeps were the central point of a massive fortress. The vast area covered by the castle extended between the River Sèvre to the markets and the modern Préfecture building to the rue Thiers, and was enclosed by an enceinte comprising approximately ten towers.

The southern keep is 28m (~95 ft) tall, reinforced with turrets and is 13.5m long on one side. The northern tower is slightly shorter at 23m and measures 14 x 15m. Both are flanked with circular turrets at the corners as well as semicircular buttresses. Each of the towers has a spiral staircase serving the upper floors. The Romanesque architecture is of a high quality with the dressed stones closely jointed. The interiors are rather spartan - there is no trace of chimneys, no large windows and no decorative sculpture. In the 15th century the area between the towers was roofed over using the 12th century walls, and turned into a lodging.

Other features of the defensive structure included a drawbridge and a dry moat 8m (~26 ft) deep.

== Later history ==
At the start of the 13th century, the townspeople of Niort were besieged by Poitevin lords from the surrounding area, who blocked the entrances to the town and cut off provisions. This blockade lasted several years and threatened starvation. The castle, with its own sources of provisions, notably from the river, became the sole supplier for the town. In 1224 the castle returned to English hands.

During the Hundred Years War in progress, Niort was alternately under French and English domination. Finally, in the 14th century, the town of Niort was securely placed under the French crown, thanks to Du Guesclin. From the end of the century, the duc de Berry, brother of Charles V, began restoring the castle including improvements to the residential parts of the keep. Windows were built or enlarged to give more light; fireplaces were installed in the grand hall which was itself split into two floors; walls were painted or coated. De Berry also built, on the right bank of the river, facing the fortress, a new port (le Port Neuf).

Following the Wars of Religion, a terrace was built at the keep to store small cannons that could be deployed as required. Around this time, the importance of Niort declined and with it the castle, which began to fall into disrepair. In 1749, the north tower collapsed, weakening the rest of the building. The castle governor suggested demolishing the whole castle and building a new fortress, more modern and more comfortable for the garrison and the munitions depot. However, it was finally restored by the engineer Artus, who underpinned the tower from 1751. Three diamond-shaped vaults on the present ground floor date from this period.

After the Revolution the castle was sold by the town to the district, who later passed it to the Département. The outer walls and its twelve towers, in a poor state since the 17th century, the houses in the courtyard and the drawbridge had all disappeared. (The remains of some towers were uncovered during the building of the modern market.) In 1817, the fortified walls of the town were sold and demolished.

Classified as a monument historique in 1840, the castle housed the families of municipal employees or was used to store départemental archives. In 1870, the Département gave the keep and its land to the town, but continued to occupy it until the start of the 20th century.

Following the first national congress of ethnology in France, held at Niort in 1896, the keep began to take on its present function as a museum, initially housing the collection of Poitevin costumes.

== Today ==
The castle houses the following museum collections:

- archaeological museum on the ground floor with Bronze Age, Gallo-Roman and Middle Ages exhibits
- museum of chamois leather and glove making on the first floor
- a reconstructed Poitevin interior from 1830 is found on the second floor, as well as a nationally important collection of costumes, headgear and jewelry.

From the roof, there is a beautiful view over the town and the Sèvre Niortaise.

== See also ==
- List of castles in France

== Sources ==
- Mairie de Niort: Vivre à Niort, N° 130 Nov 2002, pp. 13–17
- Salch, Charles-Laurent (1979). Dictionnaire des châteaux et des fortifications du moyen âge en France. Strasbourg: Publitotal. pp. 1287 pp. ISBN 2-86535-070-3.
