= Peace of Alès =

1629 peace treaty between France and the Huguenots

The Peace of Alais, also known as the Edict of Alès or the Edict of Grace, was a treaty negotiated by Cardinal Richelieu with Huguenot leaders and signed by King Louis XIII of France on 28 June 1629. It confirmed the basic religious principles of the Edict of Nantes but differed in that it contained additional clauses that stated that the Huguenots no longer had political rights and further demanded for them to relinquish all cities and fortresses immediately.

It ended the religious warring by granting the Huguenots amnesty and guaranteed them tolerance. It did not last permanently, though, as Louis XIV would later resume the persecution of Protestants, culminating in the Revocation of the Edict of Nantes in 1685.
