= Benjamin, Duke of Soubise =

French Huguenot leader

Benjamin
- Duke of Soubise
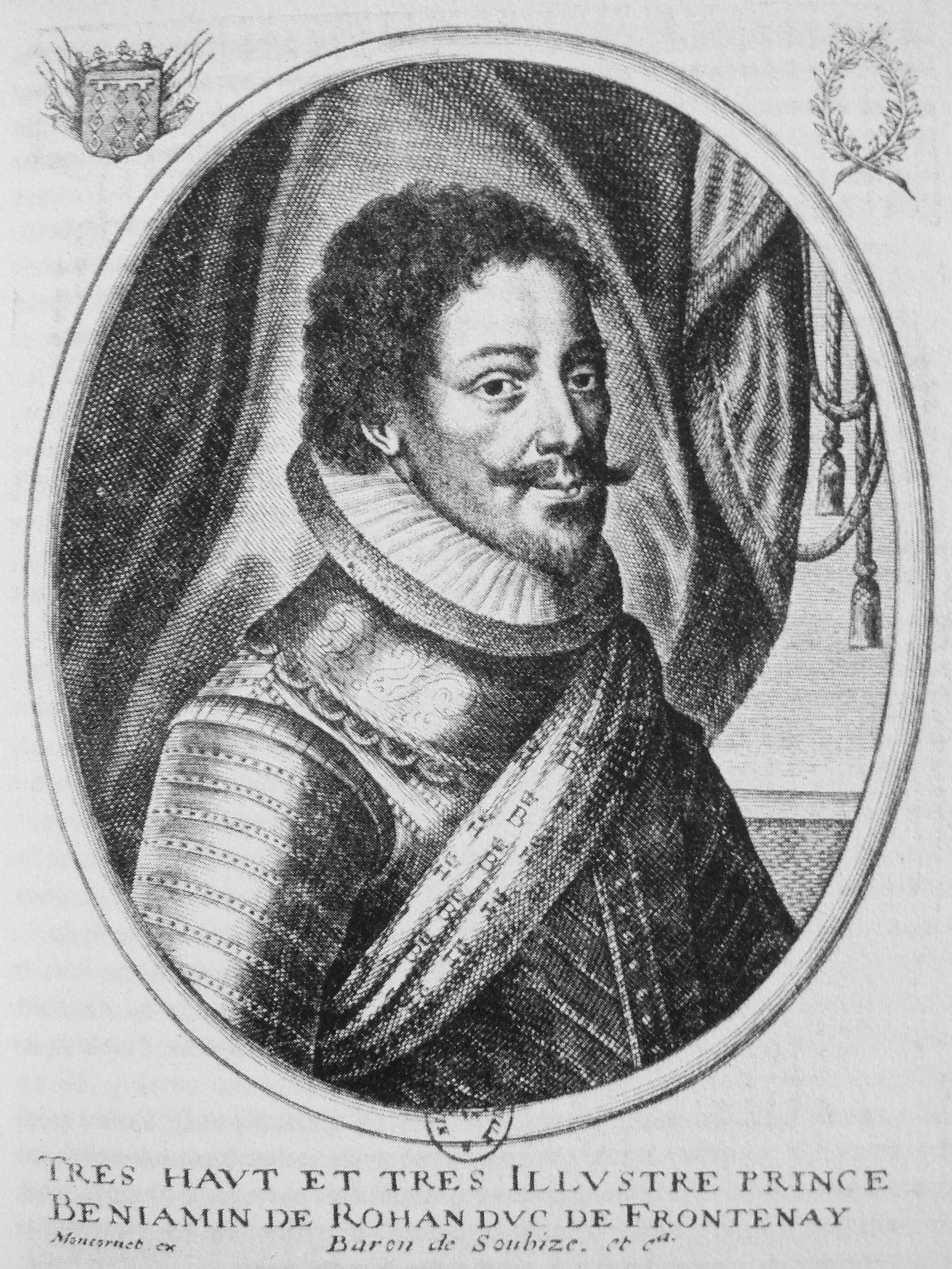
- Benjamin de Rohan, Duc de Frontenay, Baron de Soubise.
- Born: 1580
- Died: 1642 (aged 61–62)
- Noble family: Rohan
- Father: René II, Viscount of Rohan
- Mother: Catherine de Parthenay

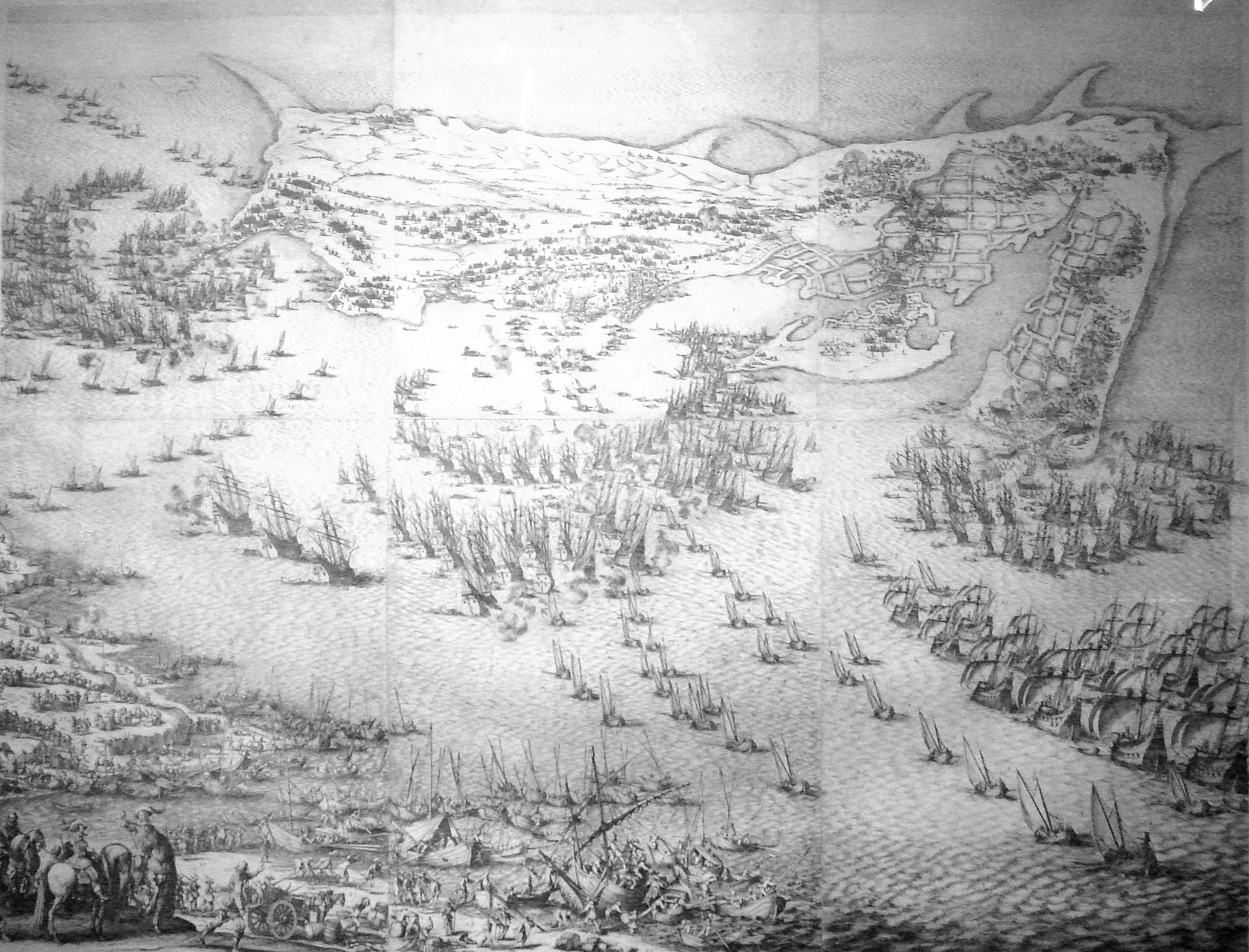
Soubise lost control of the island of Ré following the Siege of Saint-Martin-de-Ré (1625).

Benjamin de Rohan, duc de Soubise (1580–1642), was a French Huguenot leader.

Son of René II, Viscount of Rohan, and younger brother of Henri de Rohan, he inherited the lordship of Soubise through his mother Catherine de Parthenay. He served his apprenticeship as a soldier under Maurice of Nassau in the Low Countries. In the religious wars from 1621 onwards his elder brother chiefly commanded on land and in the south, Soubise in the west and along the sea-coast. His exploits in the conflict have been sympathetically related by his brother, one of the most highly regarded military critics of the time.

The guidons he seized from Royalist forces when he took control of Les Sables-d'Olonne during the Huguenot rebellions were installed in the Hôtel de Ville in La Rochelle in 1622.

Soubise's chief exploit was a singularly bold and well-conducted attack (in 1625) on the Royalist fleet in the river Blavet (which included the cutting of a boom in the face of superior numbers) and the occupation of the islands of Ré and Oléron in 1625, leading to the Siege of Saint-Martin-de-Ré in which Louis XIII recovered the island of Ré. He commanded at La Rochelle during the famous Siege of La Rochelle (1627–1628). According to his brother, the failure of the defence and of the English attack on Île de Ré was mainly due to the alternate obstinacy of the townsfolk and the English commanders in refusing to listen to Soubise's advice.

When surrender became inevitable he fled to England, which he had previously visited in quest of succour. He died in London in 1642.

== See also ==
- French wars of religion
