= René II, Viscount of Rohan =

Huguenot nobleman (1550–1586)

René II Prince of Leon
- Prince of Leon Duc of Rohan
- Born: 1550
- Died: 1586 (aged 35–36)
- Noble family: Rohan
- Spouse: Catherine de Parthenay
- Issue: Henri II, Duke of Rohan; Catherine, Countess Palatine of Zweibrücken; Benjamin, Duke of Soubise; Anne de Rohan
- Father: René I, Viscount of Rohan
- Mother: Isabella of Navarre, Viscountess of Rohan

René II, Viscount of Rohan (1550–1586), was Prince of Leon, Count of Porhoët, seigneur of Pontivy and Frontenay, and a Huguenot nobleman. He was head of one of the oldest and most distinguished families in France, which was connected with many of the reigning houses of Europe.

René de Rohan, his wife Catherine de Parthenay, their sons Henri II, Duke of Rohan and Benjamin, Duke of Soubise, and their daughter Anne de Rohan strategised and led the Huguenot army against the Catholic army throughout the French Wars of Religion.

== Early life ==
René was the son of René I, Viscount of Rohan and Isabella of Navarre, Viscountess of Rohan (who was the daughter of John III of Navarre and Catherine of Navarre, Queen Regnant of Navarre).

By November 1565, René I de Rohan forbade Catholic worship in his lands, to which Henry III of France threatened to impound his chateau.

== Marriage and issue ==
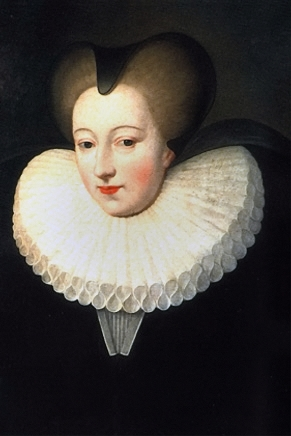
Catherine de Parthenay, a Huguenot leader, strategist, and fighter. She corresponded with other leaders and wrote plays and other works about the French Wars of Religion

René of Rohan courted Catherine de Parthenay, a widow at the age of 18. After René inherited the Rohan family's fortune and acquired the title of Viscount of Rohan, they married in 1575 in a private ceremony. She was a Huguenot leader, strategist, and fighter. Parthenay received the title Viscountess and Princess of Rohan after their marriage.

Their children include:

- René was the firstborn son, who died when young.
- Henriette de Rohan (died 1629), the eldest daughter, was with her mother during the Siege of La Rochelle, and without food to eat towards the end of the Siege, Parthenay and her daughters ate the leather from their carriage. After the war ended, she was relegated to the Château du Parc in Poitou. Henrietta never married.
- Henri II, Duke of Rohan (1579–1638) was married to Marguerite de Béthune, the eldest daughter of Maximilien de Béthune, Duke of Sully, on 7 February 1605, two years after he was made duke and a peer by Henry IV. In 1605, Henri IV accepted the marriage of Henri de Rohan and Marguerite de Béthune (aged 10), endowing them with 20,000 crowns. Henri became the leader of the Huguenot party, and the last chief during the reign of Louis XIII. His Catholic daughter Marguerite, Duchess of Rohan married Henri Chabot who took on the name and arms of Rohan. Marguerite was the sole heiress to his and his wife's fortune. Henri led the king's army in Valteline and died of his severe wounds.
- Catherine de Rohan (died 1607) — Catherine of Bourbon, her godmother and the king's sister, organised her marriage to John II, Duke of Zweibrücken. The Duke visited Henry IV at Metz, where the couple married. Bourbon died soon after. Catherine died during childbirth in 1607, three years after her marriage. She was ancestor to several famous people, among them Queen Elizabeth II.
- Benjamin, Duke of Soubise (baptised c. 1583–1642)). He was a fierce defender of the Protestant cause. He became Duke of Frontenay. When it became clear that the Huguenots would not win against the Catholics, Benjamin fled to England, where he died in 1642. Benjamin never married.
- Anne de Rohan, also Anna de Rohan (1584–1646), was a writer and a formidable woman in the fight for Calvinism, "the Rohan women were known for adroit political manoeuvring and valour in defending Protestantism." Anne never married.
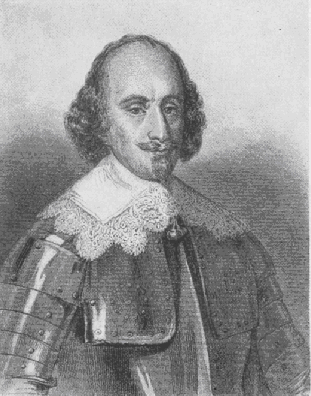
Henri II, Duke of Rohan

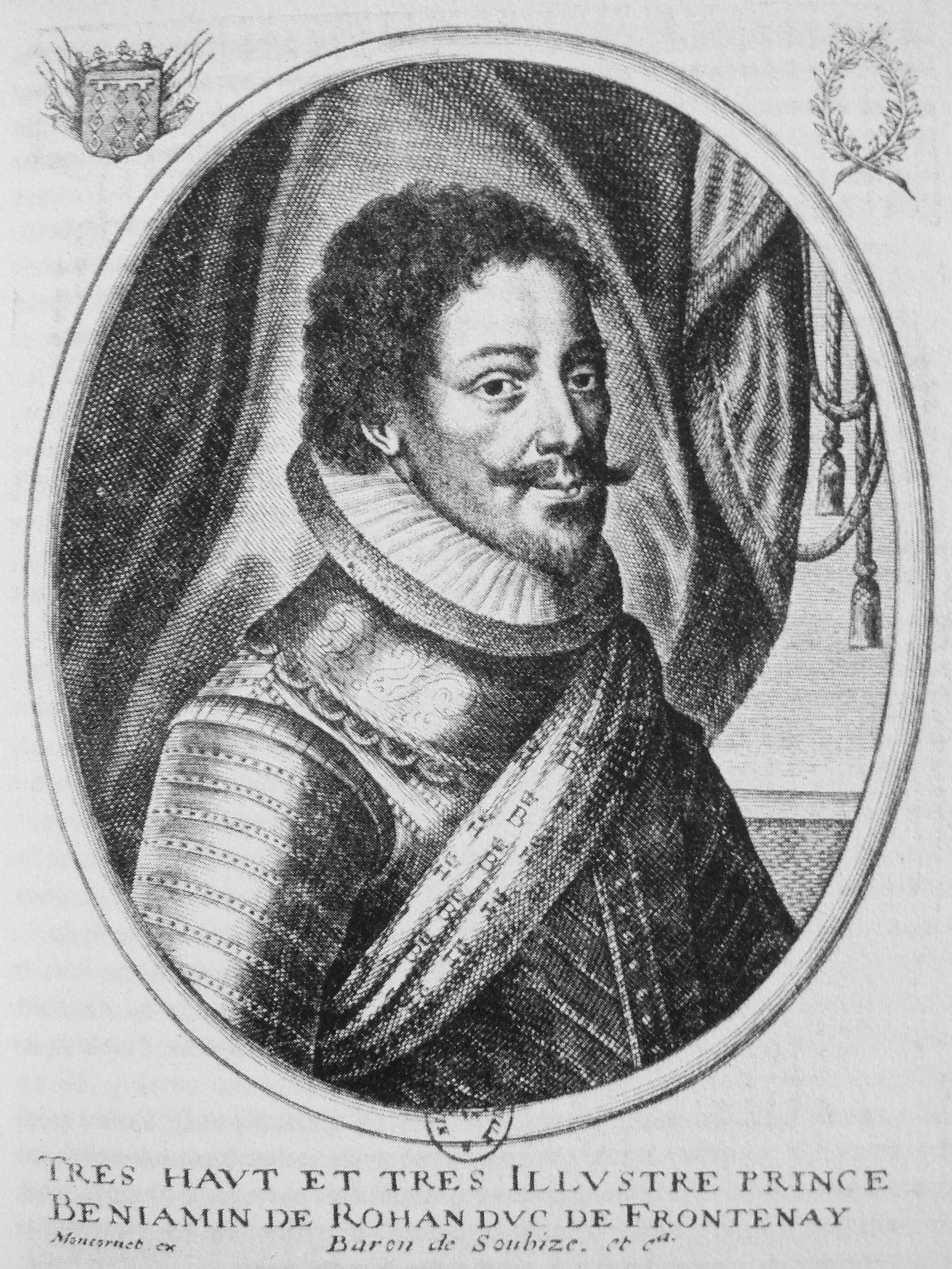
Benjamin, Duke of Soubise

== French Wars of Religion ==
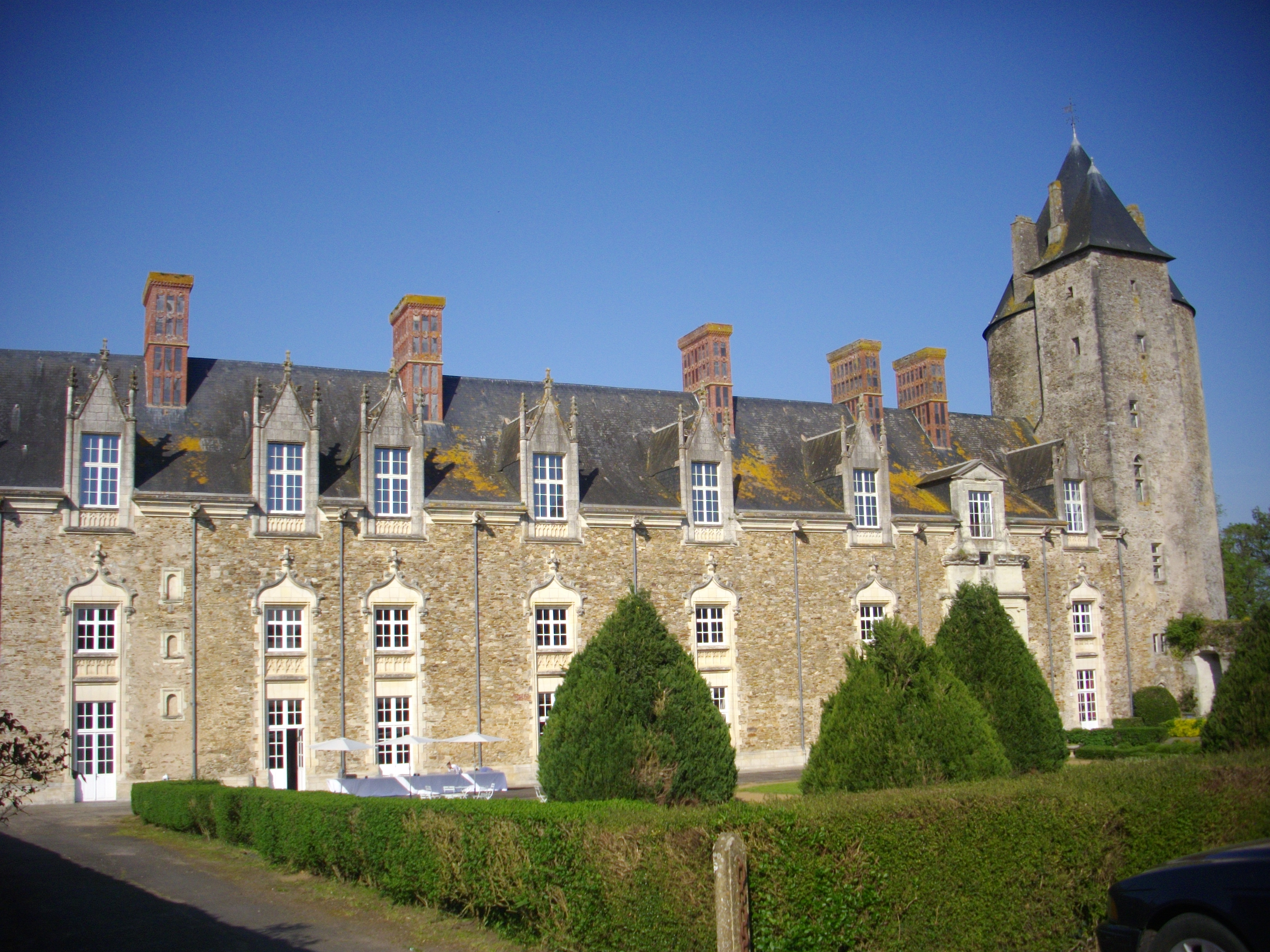
Château de Blain, one of Rohan's residences, was besieged and set on fire in 1591 during fighting between the Duke of Mercœur and Jean de Montauban, the knight De Goust. Parthenay restored Château de Blain and moved into it with her family.

Before receiving his inheritance and title, Charles de Quelennec served under René of Rohan during the French Wars of Religion. Quelennec was Catherine de Parthenay's first husband, who died during the St. Bartholomew's Day massacre (23 August 1572) in Paris due to wounds he acquired during battle.

Rohan and Parthenay were active and brave supporters of the Huguenots and fought the Catholic army throughout the French Wars of Religion. When needed, Parthenay and her children sought shelter in La Rochelle.

René de Rohan commanded the Calvinist army in 1570 and defended Lusignan, Vienne with great valour when it was besieged by the Catholics (1574–75).

René of Rohan died in La Rochelle on 27 April 1586 due to wounds he acquired during battle. Following René's death in 1586, Henry III attempted to confiscate his lands.

== Bibliography ==
- Clarke, Jack A. (1966). Huguenot Warrior: The Life and Times of Henri de Rohan, 1579–1638. Martinus Nijhoff.
- Larsen, Anne R. (2016). Anna Maria van Schurman, 'the star of Utrecht' : the educational vision and reception of a savante. Ashgate. ISBN 978-1-4724-6334-0.
- Vray, Nicole (1998). Librairie Académique Perrin puis Éditions Ampelos (ed.). Catherine de Parthenay, duchesse de Rohan, protestante insoumise [Catherine de Parthenay, Duchess of Rohan, rebellious Protestant] (in French).
- Thompson, James Westfall (1909). The Wars of Religion in France, 1559-1576. Frederick Ungar Publishing Co.
- Walsby, Malcolm (2007). The Counts of Laval: Culture, Patronage and Religion in Fifteenth- and Sixteenth-Century France. Ashgate Publishing Limited.
