= Anne de Parthenay =

- Other names: Anne de Soubise; Madame de Pons; Anne de Pons
- Known for: Patron of the arts, Huguenot supporter, companion to Renée, Duchess of Ferrara, which involved intrique when she was considered evil by the Duke
- Spouse: Antoine de Pons (m. 1534, died)
- Parent(s): Michelle de Saubonne; Jean-Larcevesque-Parthenay
- Relatives: Jean V of Parthenay (also known as Jean de Parthenay-Larcheveque, brother); Catherine de Parthenay (niece); Charles de Quelennec (nephew by marriage); René II, Viscount of Rohan (nephew by marriage)

Anne de Parthenay was a 16th-century woman who received a thorough classical education from her mother, Michelle de Saubonne, the governess to Renée, Duchess of Ferrara. Clément Marot stated in verse to Parthenay that she had "learning and sound knowledge."

When Parthenay married Antoine de Pons, their wealthy and prestigious families became more influential. She helped her husband Antoine de Pons, Count of Marennes at Ferrara, Italy. They were both companions of the Duchess of Ferrara until the Duke believed an informer that stated that Parthenay was part of a plot to poison him.

Parthenay, her mother, and her husband became Calvinists during the Protestant Reformation, having met John Calvin at Ferrara, Italy, in 1534. Calvin evaded the royal army of French Catholics during the French Wars of Religion. André Mage de Fiefmelin dedicated Oeuvres de Sieur de Fiefmelin, divisées en deux parties, a collection of his poems to Parthenay.

== Early life ==
Anne de Parthenay was the daughter of Michelle de Saubonne, a lady of Brittany, also known as Madame de Soubise. Her mother was a lady of honour to Anne of Brittany, the wife of Louis XII. Saubonne was the governess to the royal couple's daughter Renée, Duchess of Ferrara, from 1528 to 1536. Her father was Jean-Larcevesque-Parthenay. Parthenay and Jean V of Parthenay, were children of Michelle de Saubonne.

Saubonne ensured that Parthenay received a thorough classical education, including the study of music, mastery of poetic songs, theology, and the Greek and Latin languages. Clément Marot gave Parthenay the gift of a verse, "Dame de Pons, Nymphe de Parthenay / For you who have learning and sound knowledge" when he was at the court in Ferrara.

== Religion ==
Parthenay became a Calvinist during the Protestant Reformation. They were called Huguenots. Calvinism grew after John Calvin fled Paris due to his religious conversion. He sought shelter at the court of Marguerite de Navarre in Angoulême. Marguerite, who was Anne's cousin, was a Huguenot. He fled France for the court of Ferrara, where he met Anne and Antoine in 1534. Anne was formally converted by Calvin, followed by her mother, and then Antoine. Other aristocrats from Saintonge who frequented the court of Ferrara were converted, too.

Parthenay and de Pons returned to Saintonge and replicated the type of academy found in Ferrara, which included the study of humanism and religion. By the early 16th century, a culture developed in southwestern France based upon German, Italian, and French influences due to the influx of Lutheran artisans from Germany, influence at the court at Ferrara, and the conversion of its local people.

== Marriage ==
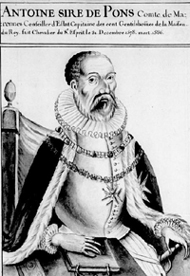
Antoine de Pons

Parthenay married Antoine de Pons (Anthony de Pons), the Comte de Marennes, who served at the court of Ferrara in 1534. They met and married at Ferrara. Antoine was a royal military and political agent for the French in northern Italy. He regularly visited the court of Ferrara.

Their marriage united the Pons family with Michelle de Saubonne and Jean-Larcevesque-Parthenay's family, making the families more influential in court due to their wealth and reputation. Both had ties to Venice and surrounding areas in northern Italy. They were "evangelical humanists and patrons at the court of Ferrara. André Mage de Fiefmelin dedicated Oeuvres de Sieur de Fiefmelin, divisées en deux parties, a collection of his poems to Parthenay.

While married to Parthenay, Antoine was a distinguished leader who lived and taught a life of 'truth and virtue', guided by scriptures. According to her biography, his countenance shifted after Parthenay's death. He became "an enemy and persecutor of the truth" after he married a 'pleasure-loving lady' of the court, Marie de Monchenu. He renounced his association with Protestantism.

== Renée, Duchess of Ferrara ==
Parthenay and her husband were friends and confidants to Renée, Duchess of Ferrara. Parthenay was also identified as one of Renée's handmaidens. Renée considered de Pons her "servant-knight", a man who she found to be charming, attentive, and attractive. Parthenay enjoyed talking with the noblemen at court, particularly sharing her thoughts about John Calvin, which was not always well received.

Renée's husband, Ercole II d'Este, Duke of Ferrara, was born into the Este and Borgia families and developed the inclination to see evil motives in the people around him. He had removed many people in the court of Ferrara that he thought were dangerous or against the Catholic Church, but it was not easy to remove his wife's close companions. Este was told by an informer that Parthenay thought that the Duke was happier when his wife was ill. Este stated this conclusion to Parthenay and that the logical conclusion would be that she would convince the duchess to kill him by poison. The Duke incited a scene at Consandolo in Emilia-Romagna, Italy that left his wife angry and full of contempt for Este. Parthenay was in tears while claiming she was not guilty. Renée left the scene to tend to a migraine and remained depressed for some time afterward. De Pons, who had been at Ferrara at the time of the incident, drove to Consandolo to pick up Parthenay and their child and took them to Venice. They were ostracized in Paris and de Pons was removed from Este's court. Parthenay was replaced by a younger French woman, but like those before her, were subject to Este's anger. After that Parthenay's replacement was asked to leave, the duchess no longer had French companions.

== Bibliography ==
- Barton, Florence Whitfield (1989). Calvin and the duchess. Louisville, KY : Westminster/J. Knox Press. ISBN 978-0-8042-0874-1.
- Freedman, Richard (2001). The chansons of Orlando di Lasso and their Protestant listeners : music, piety, and print in sixteenth-century France. Rochester, New York; Woodbridge, United Kingdom : University of Rochester Press. ISBN 978-1-58046-075-0.
- Kamil, Neil (2020-03-03). Fortress of the Soul: Violence, Metaphysics, and Material Life in the Huguenots' New World, 1517-1751. JHU Press. ISBN 978-1-4214-2935-9.
