= Luciano Nezzo =

Italian painter (1856–1903)

Luciano Nezzo (Badia Polesine, September, 1856 – Urbino, 1903) was an Italian painter, painting both history and genre subjects. The genre subjects are often poignant and dramatic.

He was born in the Province of Rovigo in the Veneto. He showed an inclination to arts since a young age, and had locally as a first master Marco Vallerini. A local patron, sponsored his education at the Academy of Fine Arts of Venice, where he studied for ten years. At the age of twenty, he had already won a gold medal for his composition: Tasso at Eleonora d'Este's deathbed and Leonardo da Vinci painting the Madonna Lisa.

He exited the Accademia to enlist as a soldier in the War of Italian independence. Stationed with the 41st regiment in Milan, he enrolled in the Brera Academy. Returning to the Veneto, he was awarded a professorship in painting at the Academy of Fine Arts of Urbino. Among two paintings sent to the 1887 Esposizione of Rovigo, which earned a silver medal; Portrait of King Umberto and Invitati a pranzo. Among his other works are: Alla finestra (1884, Turin exhibition), Buon giorno (1883, Rome exhibition), Mastro Piero, The thief, Rebecca, and many portraits. Some of his subjects recall the tense episodes depicted by Gaspare Traversi; for example, his painting of an elderly dental surgeon examining his young female patient's mouth, while hiding his tooth extractor behind his back.
