= Antoine de Pons =

Antoine de Pons, Count of Marennes
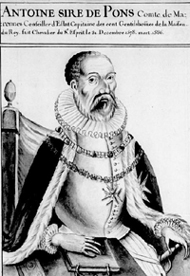
- Born: 1510
- Died: 1580 (aged 69–70)
- Spouse: Anne de Parthenay (m. 1534, died)

Antoine de Pons, Count of Marennes (1510-1580) was hereditary sire of Pons, near Saintes in Charente-Maritime with 250 noble fiefdoms and 52 parishes. He was Count of Marennes, baron of island of Oléron (Ile d'Oléron), and had other lands in France. He was the governor of Saintonge and Saintes.

Saintonge was an isolated area and fitting for de Pon's rustic Huguenot court. Huguenot refugees came to the area. It became a religious and artsistic center, where heresy was common about 1560.

De Pons was a French military and political royal agent who was often at the court of Ferrara in Italy. His marriage to Anne de Parthenay resulted in the strengthening the couple's prestige and influence, due to their wealth, humanism, and religion.

== Early life ==
Antoine de Pons was born in 1510, born into an aristocractic family of Pons, Charente-Maritime.

== Marriage ==
Pons married Anne de Parthenay in 1534. Their marriage united the Pons family with Michelle de Saubonne and Jean de Parthenay-L'Archevêque's family, making both families more influential in Court due to their wealth and reputation. Both had ties to Venice and surrounding areas in northern Italy.

This union of noble humanists and spiritual seekers harnessed classical learning to the new evangelical religion. These links ramified in material ways: they expanded their role as patrons of Huguenot artisans of novel inventions made in the rustic manner, then fashionable in ceramics, and above all, the naturalistic (or rustique) gardens and subterranean grottoes of northern Italy and southwestern France in which the first of many Protestant religious conversions were known to take place.

Anne was an intelligent woman, the daughter of Michelle de Saubonne, a lady of honour to Anne of Brittany, the wife of Louis XII. Her mother was governess of the royal couple's daughter Renata, Duchess of Ferrara from 1528 to 1536. Parthenay was well-educated, described in her biography as a "lady of great genius and learning".

While married to Parthenay, Antoine was a distinguished leader, who lived and taught a life of truth and virtue, guided by scriptures. His contenance shifted after Parthenay's death. He became "an enemy and persecutor of the truth" after he married a pleasure-loving lady of the court, Marie de Monchenu. He renounced his association with Protestantism. which upset some of the people that he had converted. However, in 1580, Bernard Palissay dedicated his book Discours admirables to de Pons in which he praised the "excellence of your mind" and what he had learned about astrology, philosophy, and mathematics. Theodore Beza, a French philosopher, stated that de Pons was "an amateur of virtue and truth, who really profited from reading the sacred Scriptures." His wife Anne was generally considered by philosophers to be the more celebrated of the two.

== Career ==
Antoine de Pons was a hereditary sire of Pons, near Saintes in Charente-Maritime. Within his lands were 250 noble fiefdoms and 52 or 102 parishes. The fortress at Pons at the time was a weak stronghold. His holdings were not attacked during his life due to the prestige of his family and himself. He was Count of Marennes, baron of island of Oléron (Ile d'Oléron), and owned other lands in France. De Pons was the governor of Saintonge and Saintes. He earned income from trading towns and salt-mines in his holdings. Saintonge was an isolated area and fitting for de Pons Huguenot court, known to be "rustic" and influenced by northern Italy. Huguenot refugees came to the area, as did Bernard Palissy and Berton. It became a religious and artsistic center, where heresy was common about 1560. De Pons and Parthenay were Palissy's patrons.

Antoine de Pons was a royal military and political agent for the French in northern Italy. He regularly visited the court of Ferrara. Pons was a distinguished leader, who lived and taught a life of truth and virtue, guided by scriptures.

De Pons was knighted into the Order of the Holy Spirit and was the captain of 100 gentlemen of Maison du Roi, the king's household. He was officer of the bedchamer and agent to King Francis I of France, who made de Pons a member of the Order of St. Michael. He was a favorite at the French court.

== Renée, Duchess of Ferrara ==
De Pons and his wife were friends and confidants to Renée, Duchess of Ferrara. Renée considered de Pons her "servant-knight", a man who she found to be charming, attentive, and attractive. Her Italian relatives thought that de Pons was too accommodating to the Duchess, and wished to separate him from the court. Born of Este and Borgia blood, the Duke separated the two when he sent de Pons on a mission, while Parthenay remained with in Ferrara with Renée. Este did not like the rate at which de Pons and Renée were writing each other and intercepted most of their letters. When de Pons returned to Ferrara, the Duke sent his wife to Consandolo, also in Emilia-Romagna, Italy.

== Bibliography ==
- Barton, Florence Whitfield (1989). Calvin and the duchess. Louisville, KY : Westminster/J. Knox Press. ISBN 978-0-8042-0874-1.
- Kamil, Neil (2020-03-03). Fortress of the Soul: Violence, Metaphysics, and Material Life in the Huguenots' New World, 1517-1751. JHU Press. ISBN 978-1-4214-2935-9.
