= Lucrezia d'Este (1535–1598) =

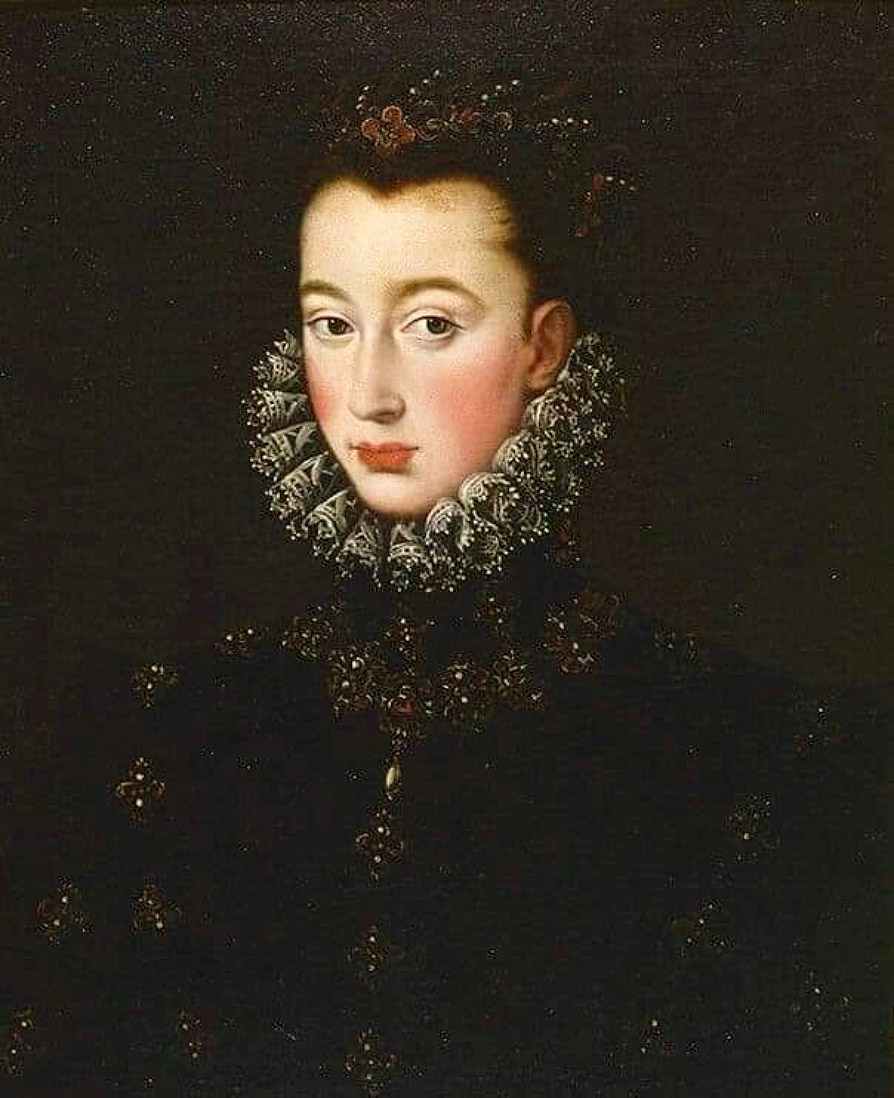
- Portrait attributed to Federico Zuccari

Duchess consort of Urbino Lady consort of Pesaro
- Tenure: 28 September 1574 – 12 February 1598
- Born: 16 December 1535; Ferrara
- Died: 12 February 1598 (aged 62); Ferrara
- Burial: Corpus Domini, Ferrara
- Spouse: Francesco Maria II della Rovere, Duke of Urbino (m. 1570; sep. 1578)
- House: Este (by birth); Della Rovere (by marriage)
- Father: Ercole II d'Este, Duke of Ferrara
- Mother: Renée of France

Lucrezia d'Este (16 December 1535 – 12 February 1598) was an Italian noblewoman. By birth she was a member of the House of Este, and by marriage to Francesco Maria II della Rovere, Duke of Urbino, she was Duchess consort of Urbino and Sora, and Lady consort of Pesaro, Senigallia, Fossombrone and Gubbio.

She was one of the most educated women of her time, and a notable patron of scientists and poets. The negotiations she initiated with the Holy See preserved the sovereign status and titles of the Duchy of Modena and Reggio for the House of Este.

== Life ==
=== Early years ===
Born in Ferrara on 16 December 1535, Lucrezia was the third child and second daughter of Ercole II d'Este, Duke of Ferrara, and Renée of France, Duchess of Chartres, Countess of Gisors and Lady of Montargis. Her paternal grandparents were Alfonso I d'Este, Duke of Ferrara, and the famous Lucrezia Borgia, daughter of Pope Alexander VI; her maternal grandparents were King Louis XII of France and Anne, Duchess of Brittany. Lucrezia was named after her paternal grandmother.

Thanks to the efforts of her mother Renée, who invited talented teachers to the Ferrarese court, Lucrezia and her sisters, Anna and Eleonora, received an excellent education. The princesses studied ancient and modern languages, classical literature, philosophy and poetry, as well as music and vocals. Lucrezia's teachers were the humanists Olympia Fulvia Morata, Franciscus Portus, Aonio Paleario and Bartolomeo Ricci. She was fond of theatre, and was a patron of scientists and poets. This included the philosopher Franciscus Patricius and the poet Torquato Tasso, who dedicated the poem O figlie di Renata (O daughters of Renata) to Lucrezia and her younger sister Eleonora.

Lucrezia's life changed shortly after the death of her father in 1559, when her mother returned to her homeland. The princess loved court ceremonies, and gossip about her behaviour soon started to spread. She entered into an affair with the captain of the Ducal Guard, Count Ercole Contrari, a relationship which continued after her marriage.

=== Unhappy marriage; Duchess consort of Urbino ===
Lucrezia remained unmarried for a long time. Aged 35, she agreed to marry the 20-year-old Francesco Maria della Rovere, Hereditary Prince of Urbino. The princess' decision to marry was for the interests of her family. The primary purpose of the marriage remained to prevent the absence of a male heir within the main branch of the House of Este; such an absence would necessitate the return of their domains to the Papal States. Duke Alfonso II, Lucrezia's brother, had no issue despite being married twice. The only close agnate who could succeed him was their cousin Cesare d'Este, Marquis of Montecchio, the only legitimate son of Alfonso d'Este, in turn the illegitimate (but later legitimized) son of Duke Alfonso I. Thus, the matrimonial union between the Houses of Este and Della Rovere was supposed to testify the mutual support between the two dynasties if necessary.

On 18 February 1570 the wedding ceremony took place in Ferrara, after which the couple departed for Pesaro. As a dowry, Lucrezia received the amount of 150,000 ducats. The relationship of the newly crowned Princess of Urbino with her father-in-law was good. Duke Guidobaldo II della Rovere didn't interfere with his daughter-in-law's hobbies of poetry, music and theatrical performances. When, after the death of his father on 28 September 1574, Francesco Maria II della Rovere became the new Duke of Urbino, Lucrezia became the Duchess consort of Urbino. Her relationship with her younger husband was always difficult: without hesitation, the Duke pointed out that the failure of having children was Lucrezia's fault due to her old age, despite the fact that he himself infected her with syphilis.

After her marriage, her brother learned of her affair with the captain of the Ducal Guard, Count Ercole Contrari, which had continued after her marriage, and on 2 August 1575, her brother Duke Alfonso II ordered for them to be taken to the Ducal Palace in Ferrara and, once they arrived, ordered for Count Contrari to be strangled in front of his sister. However, this did not affect Lucrezia's determination to make her own choices, and after some time she entered into a new love affair with Count Luigi Montecuccoli.

During these years, Lucrezia found a great source of consolation in her friendship with Torquato Tasso, who was on duty at the Duchess's court in Pesaro and Urbania. After eight years of marriage, and through the mediation of Cardinal Carlo Borromeo, the ducal couple of Urbino were finally able to obtain a separation. On 31 August 1578, the Holy See allowed the couple to live separately, but their marriage was not annulled. Lucrezia returned to Ferrara and continued to be the duchess consort of Urbino. Only after her death was her widowed husband able to remarry and produce an heir.

=== Later years: the Devolution of Ferrara ===
After her lover Count Ercole Contrari was killed in 1575 by her brother Alfonso II upon discovery of their relationship, Lucrezia had increasingly tense and difficult relations with other family members of the House of Este. Lucrezia became a defender of the interest of the Holy See against her own family and the Duchy of Ferrara. This was a crucial political phase that saw the publication in 1567 of the papal bull Prohibitio alienandi et infeudandi civitates et loca Sanctae Romanae Ecclesiae by Pope Pius V, which prohibited illegitimate children (or the descendants) from being invested in Church fiefdoms.

The death of Alfonso II without descendants in 1597 ended the main branch of the House of Este, who ruled Ferrara since the 12th century. In accordance with the papal bull Prohibitio alienandi... of 1567, the Duchies of Ferrara, Modena and Reggio had to be returned to the Papal States. Lucrezia was an important and decisive ally for the Papacy in this matter as she was completely hostile to her brother's designated heir, Cesare d'Este, who feared being excommunicated by Pope Clement VIII. However, Cesare, trusting in Lucrezia's proximity and her contacts with Rome and underestimating the hatred she had for him and the Este dynasty, sent her to meet Cardinal Pietro Aldobrandini, the papal legate designated to take possession of Ferrara. The meeting, known as the Faenza Convention (Convenzione faentina) took place in Faenza on 13 January 1598. An agreement was reached whereby the Holy See took effective control not only over Ferrara, but also other territories which were not papal fiefs with certainty and that could have remained with the House of Este, such as Comacchio, Lugo, Bagnacavallo and Conselice. Abandoned by his foreign allies, Cesare was forced to accept these harsh conditions and had to leave Ferrara. Lucrezia was able to retain for her family the Duchies of Modena and Reggio, whose investiture was secured by Rudolph II, Holy Roman Emperor. Thus the so-called Devolution of Ferrara (Devoluzione di Ferrara) took place.

=== Death ===
In the last years of her life, Lucrezia experienced health problems. She died in Ferrara on 12 February 1598 aged 62. She was buried in the Este necropolis at the Corpus Domini monastery alongside her siblings, parents and grandparents.

== Bibliography ==
- Apparuti, Giorgio (2007). Paolo Vasco Ferrari (ed.). Ducato di Modena et Reggio 1598—1859: lo Stato, la corte, le arti (in Italian). Modena: Artioli. ISBN 978-8-87-792109-3.
- Capponi, Gaetano (1846). Sulla causa finora ignota delle sventure di Torquato Tasso (in Italian). Firenze: Pezzati.
- Carpinello, Mariella (1988). Lucrezia d'Este: duchessa di Urbino (in Italian). Milano: Rusconi. ISBN 978-8-81-823019-2.
- Chiappini, Luciano (2001). Gli Estensi: mille anni di storia (in Italian). Ferrara: Corbo. ISBN 978-8-88-269029-8.
- Scifoni, Felice (1842). Dizionario biographie universelle (in Italian). Firenze: D. Passigli.
- Tonelli, Luigi (1935). Tasso. Torino: Paravia.
- Williams, George L. (2004). Papal Genealogy: The Families and Descendants of the Popes. Jefferson, N.C.: McFarland. ISBN 978-0-78-642071-1.
