= Camillo Renato =

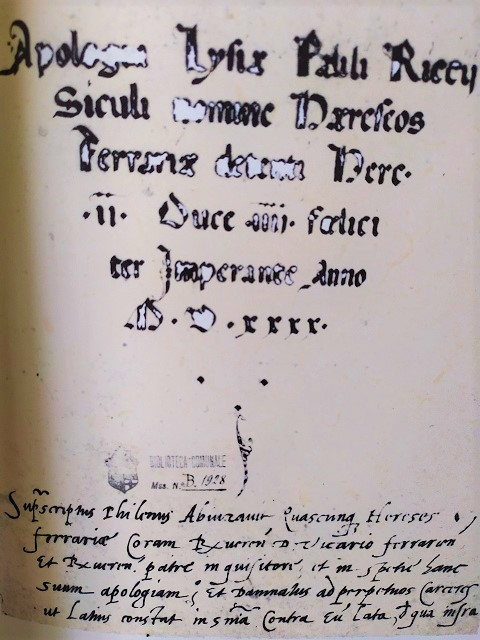
Apology of Lysias Philaenus Paulus Ricci Siculi Ferraria in the name of the heretics detained under the happy reign of Hercules II, Duke III, Year A. D. XXXX

Paolo Ricci (c. 1500, in Palermo – c. 1575, in Caspano, Civo) was a Franciscan, then a Lutheran, possibly an Anabaptist, and only allegedly an Antitrinitarian. He also adopted academic pseudonyms: Lisia Fileno (Latin: Lysias Paulus Riccius Philaenus), Fileno Lunardi, and finally the name Camillo Renato.

== Paolo Lysias Philaenus Ricci ==
He was born Paolo Ricci and became a Franciscan. In the 1530s he frequented circles sympathetic to the Reformation in Naples, then moved to Padua and Venice where, among other things, he challenged the existence of purgatory. Ricci writes: "some slanderers accused me of heresy, I was detained, prosecuted, not convicted, not condemned, did not abjure on any matter and was discharged." Emerging free from this trial, towards the end of 1538 went from Venice to Bologna, with the intention to go later in Rome for "consult with some very learned and reverend cardinals to the glory of Christ and for harmony and common interest of all the Church."

In Bologna Ricci was tutor to the three sons of Giulio Danesi - to whom he dedicated three Latin carmina. And in Bologna Ricci first effected a Latin pseudonym, Lysias Philaenus, as was common among those attended and intellectual circles, where art, religion and moral philosophy were discussed. He himself gives the names of the participants in Bologna: humanists Leandro Alberti, Romulus Amasea and Achille Bocchi, and the noblemen Francesco Bolognetti, Giulio Danesi, Cornelio Lambertini, and Alessandro Manzoli.

In 1540 he was forced to recant some ideas in Modena, but Ricci became progressively more radical, developing ideas beyond what was published in his 1540 Apologia in his born name.

== The baptism of 'Camillo the Reborn' ==
In 1540, he was arrested for heresy in Ferrara, but escaped, possibly at the intervention of Duchess Renée de France, and moved into exile in Valtellina, which at the time was under the protectorate of the Grisons. Sometime before 1545, he adopted the name Camillo Renato (Camillo the Reborn) possibly as an expression of his break with his previous infant Christening.

He died c. 1575.

== Works ==
- Correspondence to Heinrich Bullinger, in «Bullingers Korrespondenz mit den Graubündnern», Basel 1904-1905
- Carmina, Codex. 52. II. 1, University Library, Bologna c.1538?
- Apologia Lysiae Pauli Riccii Philaeni Siculi nomine haereseos detenti Hercule II Duce III foeliciter imperante anno 1540, in MS B 1928, Archiginnasio Library, Bologna
- Miscellaneous items, in ms. B. 1859, Archiginnasio Library, Bologna
- Treaty concerning baptism and of the Holy Supper, in ms. A. 93. 13, Burgerbibliothek, Bern
- Certa in Symbolum professio ad Fridericum Salicem virum optimum, 1547
- In Johannem Calvinum de injusto Michaelis Serveti incendio, Traona 1554
- Works. Documents and testimonies - Opere. Documenti e testimonianze, edited Antonio Rotondò, Firenze-Chicago 1968

== Bibliography ==
- Renato, Camillo, and Antonio Rotondò. Opere: Documenti e Testimonianze. Corpus Reformatorum Italicorum. Edited by Luigi Firpo and Giorgio Spini. Firenze: G. C. Sansoni, 1968.
- Williams, George Huntston. "Camillo Renato (c. 1500-1575?)." In Italian Reformation Studies in Honor of Laelius Socinus, ed. John A. Tedeschi, 103–83. Firenze: Felice Le Monnier, 1965.
- Williams, George Huntston. "Camillus Renatus Called Also Lysias Philaenus and Paulo Ricci (c. 1500-c. 1575): Forerunner of Socinianism on Individual Immortality." In Harry Austryn Wolfson Jubilee Volume on the Occasion of His Seventy-Fifth Birthday, ed. American Academy for Jewish Research. Vol. 2, 833–70. Jerusalem: American Academy for Jewish Research, 1965.
- Casadei, Alfredo. Lisia Fileno e Camillo Renato: Estratto della Rivista Religio 15 (1939). Roma: s.n., 1939?
- Rotondò, Antonio. "Per la Storia dell'Eresia a Bologna nel Secolo XVI." Rinascimento: Rivista dell'Istituto Nazionale di Studi sul Rinascimento 2 (1962): 107–54.
- Rotondò, Antonio. "Camillo Renato: Trattato del Battesimo e Della Santa Cena." Rinascimento: Rivista dell'Istituto Nazionale di Studi sul Rinascimento 15 (1964): 341–62.
- Cantimori, Delio. Anabattismo e Neoplatonismo nel XVI Secolo in Italia. 1936. Reprint. Roma: Aseq, 2009.
- Cantimori, Delio, and Elisabeth Feist. Per la Storia degli Eretici Italiani del Secolo XVI in Europa. Studi e Documenti, vol. 7. Roma: Reale Accademia d'Italia, 1937.
- Calvani, Simona. "Camillo Renato." In Bibliotheca Dissidentium: Répertoire des Non-Conformistes Religieux des Seizième et Dix-Septième Siècles, ed. Jean Rott and André Séguenny. Vol. 4, 155–93. Bibliotheca Bibliographica Aureliana, vol. 94. Baden-Baden: V. Koerner, 1984.
- Gleason, Elisabeth G. Reform Thought in Sixteenth-Century Italy. Texts and Translations Series / American Academy of Religion, vol. 4. Chico, CA: Scholars Press, 1981.
- Renato, Camillo. "Carmen." In Italian Reformation Studies in Honor of Laelius Socinus, ed. John A. Tedeschi, 185–95. Translated by Dorothy Rounds. Firenze: Felice Le Monnier, 1965.
- Disseau, Maël L. D. S. "Segni: Camillo Renato's Anabaptist View of Baptism and the Lord's Supper?" Ph.D., Southwestern Baptist Theological Seminary, 2014.
