= Luigi d'Este =

Italian cardinal (1538–1586)

His Eminence Luigi d'Este
- Cardinal-Deacon of Santa Maria in Via Lata
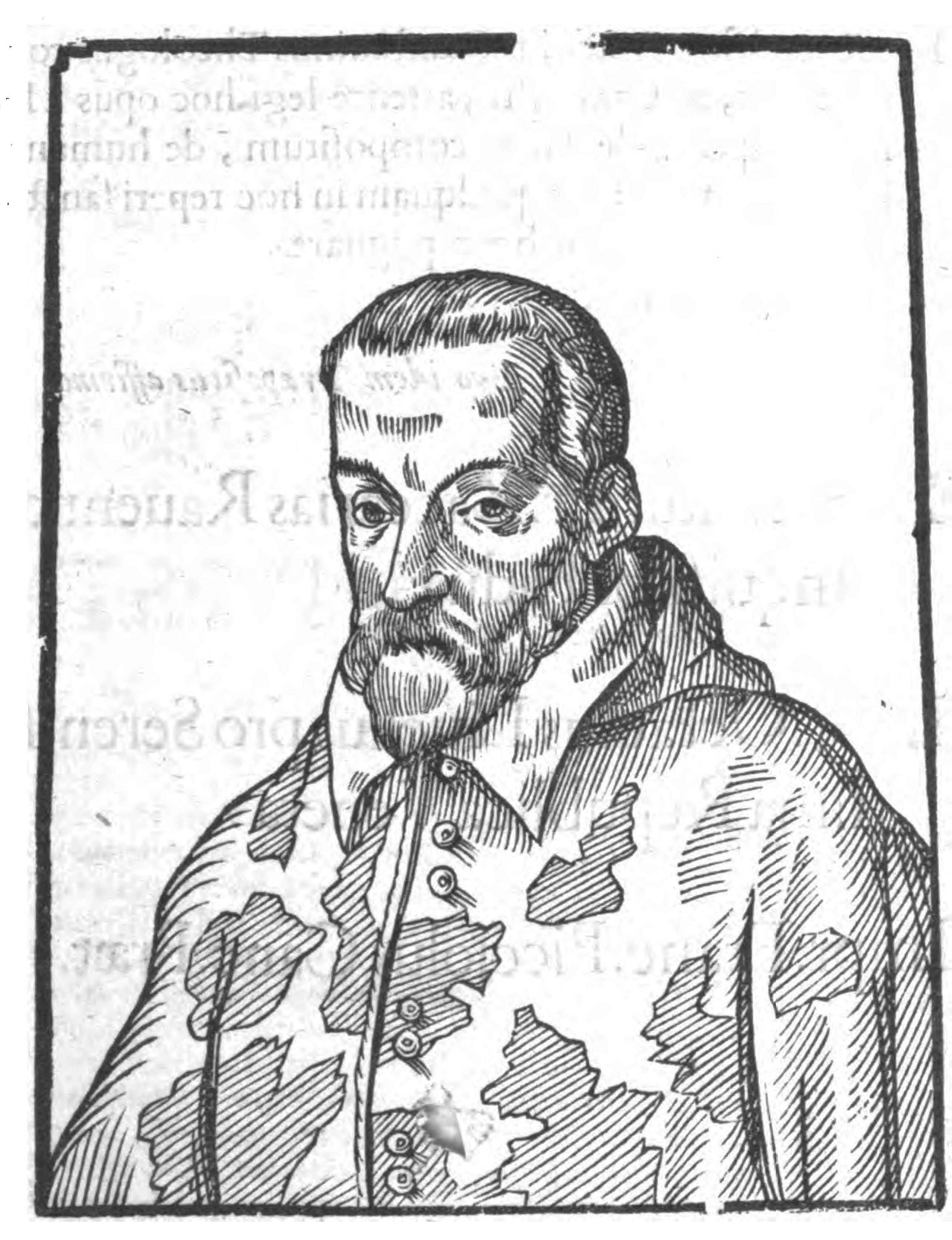
- Portrait by Fermo Guisoni, 16th century
- Church: Catholic Church
- Appointed: 24 March 1583
- Term ended: 30 December 1586
- Predecessor: Antonio Carafa
- Successor: Ferdinando de' Medici
- Previous posts: See list: Bishop of Ferrara (1550-1564); Cardinal-Deacon of Sant'Angelo in Pescheria (1577-1583)

Orders
- Created cardinal: 26 February 1561 by Pope Pius IV
- Rank: Cardinal-Deacon

Personal details
- Born: 21 December 1538 Ferrara, Italy
- Died: 30 December 1586 (aged 54) Rome, Papal States
- Buried: Santa Maria Maggiore
- Coat of arms

Luigi d'Este (21 December 1538 – 30 December 1586) was an Italian Catholic cardinal, the second son of the five children of Ercole II d'Este, Duke of Modena and Ferrara, and Renée de Valois, daughter of Louis XII of France.

== Biography ==
Luigi, a member of the House of Este, was born in Ferrara. A man of the world whose personal emblem was Prometheus bearing fire in the stalk of fennel, he was made a Cardinal of the Roman Catholic Church in Pius IV's consistory of 26 February 1561 and served as Cardinal Protector of the kingdom of France, which made him one of the most powerful and influential members of the College of Cardinals; he kept as his secretary Arnaud d'Ossat, a skillful French diplomat who was eventually made a cardinal himself.

He was Bishop of Ferrara (1550) and Apostolic Administrator of Ferrara (1561 – 8 October 1563), deacon of S. Angelo in Pescheria (1577–1583) He participated in the Papal conclave, 1565–1566 but not in the conclave of 1572, as he was absent in France. He played a key role, however, in the Papal conclave, 1585.

Luigi d'Este lived partly in Rome and partly at the Villa d'Este, Tivoli, built for his uncle Ippolito II d'Este. In Rome he rented from the Orsini an agglomeration of case at Montegiordano, near Piazza Navona, where he kept in attendance the large famiglia or household expected of a man of his birth and position, and a villa suburbana on the Quirinal that is now the residence of the President of Italy. Careless of his mounting debts, Cardinal d'Este was the most influential patron of the madrigal composer Luca Marenzio, whom he employed as maestro di cappella from August 1578 until the time of his death: during the eight-year period, Marco Bizzarini observes, Marenzio published some two-thirds of his copious output. To Cardinal d'Este Marenzio dedicated his Primo libro de' madrigali a5, 1580, "because of the debt of an infinite number of favours", and books of motets published at Venice were dedicated by Bertoldo Sperindio (1562) and Francesco Portinaro (1568). Cardinal d'Este was a generous patron of scholars, men of letters—like the poet Torquato Tasso, who was taken to Paris in 1565 in the Cardinal's household and dedicated his Rinaldo to him but was deemed mentally unstable in 1579 and confined at Ferrara for several years, during which he wrote a number of philosophical dialogues and discourses—and scientists, such as the Neapolitan polymath Giambattista della Porta, whom he invited to join him in Rome in 1579. Among the Cardinal's paintings was Correggio's Mystic Marriage of Saint Catherine, now in the Louvre.

Luigi d'Este died in Rome in 1586. He bequeathed his entire estate to his brother Alfonso II d'Este. Luigi d'Este is buried in the church of S. Maria Maggiore (commonly known as S. Francesco), Tivoli.

== Ancestry ==
Ancestors of Luigi d'Este

16. Niccolò III d'Este, Marquis of Ferrara
8. Ercole I d'Este, Duke of Ferrara
17. Ricciarda of Saluzzo
4. Alfonso I d'Este, Duke of Ferrara
18. Ferdinand I of Naples
9. Eleanor of Naples
19. Isabella of Clermont
2. Ercole II d'Este, Duke of Ferrara
20. Jofré Llançol i Escrivà
10. Pope Alexander VI
21. Isabel de Borja
5. Lucrezia Borgia
22. Giacommo de Candia, conte dei Cattanei
11. Vannozza dei Cattanei
23. Mencia Pinctoris
1. Luigi d'Este
24. Louis I de Valois, Duke of Orléans
12. Charles I de Valois, Duke of Orléans
25. Valentina Visconti
6. Louis XII of France
26. Adolph I, Duke of Cleves
13. Marie of Cleves
27. Mary of Burgundy
3. Renée of France
28. Richard of Brittany
14. Francis II, Duke of Brittany
29. Marguerite d'Orléans
7. Anne, Duchess of Brittany
30. Gaston IV, Count of Foix
15. Margaret of Foix
31. Eleanor of Navarre
