= Jean Marot =

French poet

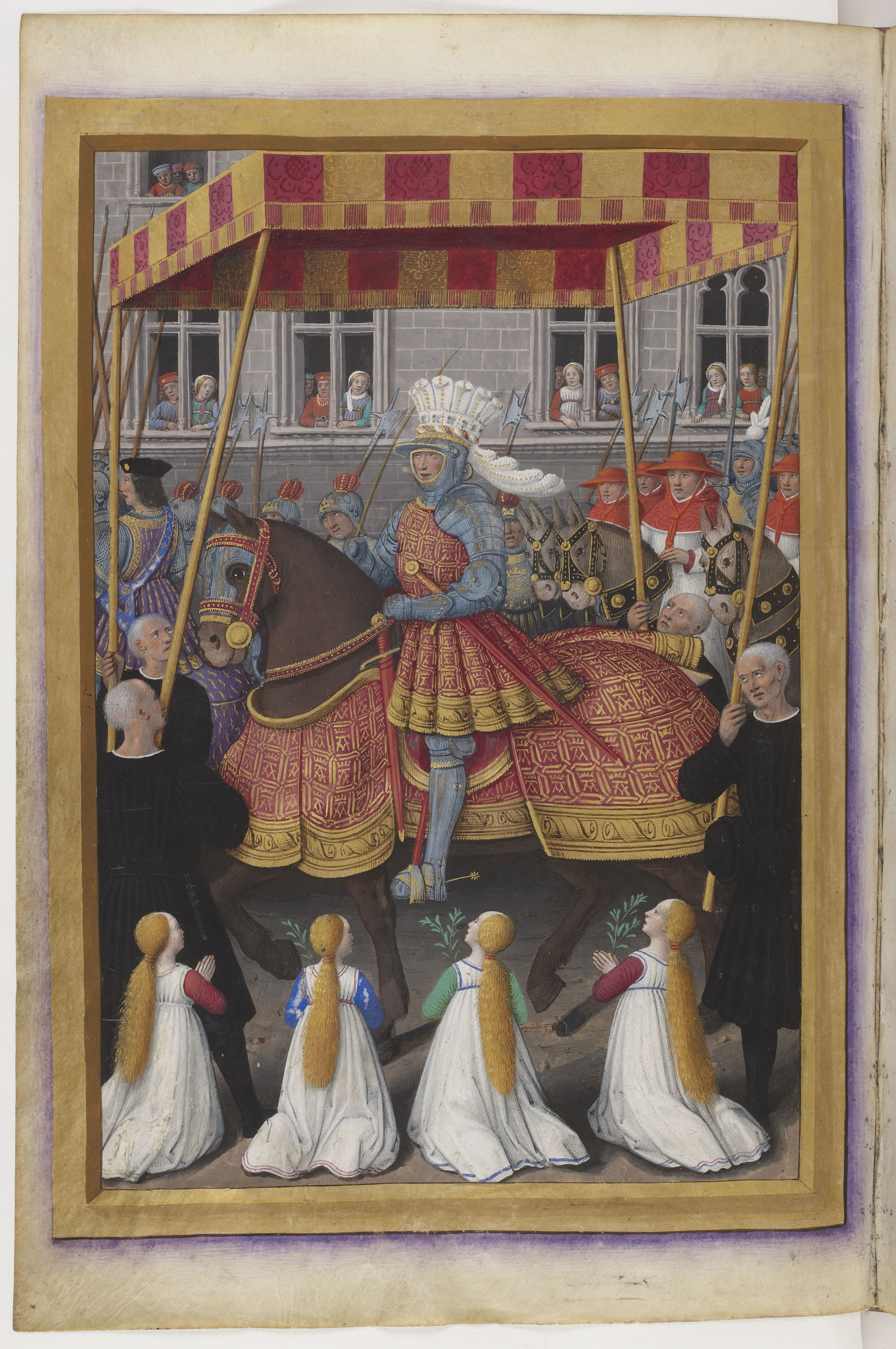

Jean Marot (English: /mɑːˈroʊ/ mah-ROH, French: [ʒɑ̃ maʁo]; Mathieu, near Caen, 1463 – c. 1526) was a French poet of the late 15th and early 16 century and the father of the French Renaissance poet Clément Marot. He is often grouped with the "Grands Rhétoriqueurs". Jean Marot seems to have disdained his surname and signed "Jean des Marestz".

== Biography ==
Marot was born Jehan Desmaretz at Mathieu, near Caen in 1463. He received a neglected education, and thus did not learn Latin, but made up for it by studying history, fable and poetry from authors. His verses were enjoyed by Michelle de Saubonne, wife of the Lord of Le château du Parc-Soubise situated in Mouchamps. For this she presented him to Anne of Brittany, Queen of France, and in 1506 he obtained the post of escripvain (poet laureate-cum-historiographer). He became her secretary in 1506 and her official poet.

Jean became the official poet of three French kings Louis XII and Francis I of France. By Anne of Brittany's order, he followed Louis 12th on his expeditions to Genoa and Venice against Julius II, with the express mission of celebrating them. This was done in two poems entitled Voyage de Gênes and Voyage de Venise, in which the use of the supernatural coexists with historical accuracy. The first poem recounts the capture of Genoa by the armies of Louis 12th in 1506 and the second the victory of the royal troops over the Venetians at Agnadello in 1509. When Louis XII died, Marot entered the service of Francis I of France and composed a poem in which the Nobility, the Church and Labour, i.e. the three orders, plead one after the other the cause of king, who had just aroused discontent by implementing new taxes.

He died in Paris around 1526. His son Clément Marot, the child of his second wife, was then appointed in his place, as valet de chambre to the king Francis I of France, and likewise became a noted poet.
