= Michelle de Saubonne =

French royal governess (1485–1549)

- Lady of Soubise
- Born: 1485; Kingdom of France
- Died: 1549 (aged 63–64); Saintonge; Kingdom of France
- Spouses: Jean IV of Parthenay, Lord of Soubise
- Issue: Daughters Anne, Charlotte, and Rene — and son Jean V of Parthenay
- Father: Denis de Saubonne, Lord of Fresnes-Coudray

Michelle de Saubonne, Madame de Soubise (1485–1549) was a French courtier who served as lady-in-waiting to Anne of Brittany, as the Governess of the Children of France beginning in 1499, and as the governess for the children of Ercole II d'Este, Duke of Ferrara. She and Anne became best friends and, as she was dying, she asked Michelle de Saubon to be a mother and guardian for her daughter Renée, Duchess of Ferrara, from 1528 to 1536. Like her mother, Renée had a close relationship with Michelle, both of whom had become Protestants. Renée's husband, Ercole II, was a Catholic and he resented having many French Protestants, also known as Huguenots in his court and diverting his wife's attention away from Catholicism.

Michelle de Saubonne was an intelligent woman of influence in the court. Because of that and the conflict between the Protestants and Catholic peoples that reigned, she was dismissed from her court duties twice, the first in 1515 when Francis I of France had her ousted. She was again dismissed of her duties by Ercole II in 1536. He ultimately removed all of the French people in his court in Ferrara.

Michelle's influence in her and Renée's children's lives was significant, they were raised to be Protestants and they and fought against the Catholics for religious freedom. Their children were among the intelligent elite of the day.

== Early life and education ==
Michelle de Saubonne, the daughter of nobleman Denis de Saubonne, Lord of Fresnes-Coudray, was born in 1485.

Her father was gentleman of the chamber and bailiff of Chartres and councilor to the king. Michelle de Saubonne was among the educated elite, having studied the arts and literature. She was among the most brilliant and appreciated people at Anne of Brittany's court.

== Marriage and children ==
In 1507 or 1508, she married Jean IV of Parthenay, Lord of Soubise, becoming Madame de Soubise. She was Parthenay's second wife. He died five years after their marriage. Anne, Renee, Charlotte, and Jean V of Parthenay, were children of Michelle de Saubonne. Through her son, Jean, she is the grandmother of mathematician Catherine de Parthenay.

Saubonne ensured that her children received a good classical education, including the study of music, theology, and the Greek and Latin languages, as well as mastery of poetic songs.

== Royal and ducal courts ==
=== Anne of Brittany ===
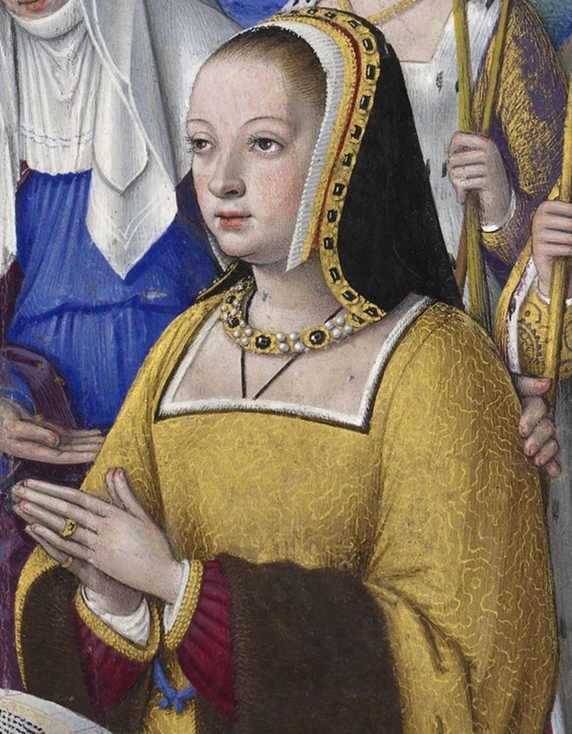
Jean Bourdichon, Great Hours of Anne of Brittany, miniature, c. 1503–1508)

In January 1499, following the death of Françoise de Dinan (Anne of Brittany's governess), Michelle de Saubonne served Anne of Brittany as a lady-in-waiting, managing her jewels and clothing.

In 1505, she was chosen to serve as a companion of Anne of Brittany and took care of the queen's jewels and linens. She shared the role of queen's secretary with Hélène de Laval. She was instrumental in bringing Jean Marot to the French court, whose poems were admired by the queen. She also introduced the queen to other writers of that time, including Jean Lemaire de Belges.

In 1510, she was appointed by Louis XII to the post of Governess of the Children of France. As a royal governess, she was in charge of the education of the king and queen's youngest daughter, Renée of France.

She was banished from court in 1515 by Francis I of France for opposing the annexation of Brittany to the French crown and for her support for Anne of Brittany over Louise of Savoy. She left the court with her four children and lived at her home Château du Parc-Soubise.

=== Renée de France ===
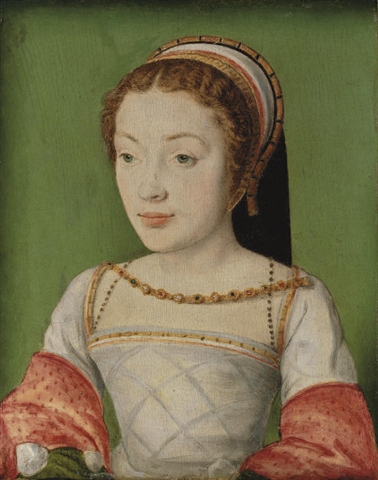
Corneille de Lyon, Renée, Duchess of Ferrara, c. 1530

Michelle de Saubonne was the governess to the royal couple's daughter, Renée, Duchess of Ferrara, from 1528 to 1536. By the time that Renée was four years old, her parents had died. Since Michelle and Anne were best friends, Renee's governess became her mother figure and guardian, as Anne said before she died, "I give her to you and want you to be her mother, restoring to her the friendship you have given me." She was responsible, too, for her education.

Renée married Ercole II d'Este, Duke of Ferrara, who was born into Este and Borgia families. He developed the inclination to see evil motives in the people around him.

When arrangements were made for her marriage, Renée stipulated that she would be bringing Michelle de Saubonne and her three daughters with her to Ferrara. Michelle was appointed as governess for the two daughters and son of the Duke of Ferrara. Michelle and Renée's daughters became distinguished for their intelligence and influence.

The city of Ferrara was an intellectual and artistic center, just second in Italy to Florence. Scholarly, religious, and artistic luminaries were welcome at court. For instance, the duchess welcomed John Calvin and Jean Marot to Ferrara and the most influential people radiated around Michelle, who was said by Guillaume Budé to be a woman of wisdom and important connections. Renée's court became a learning center for talented humanists, and she was a reputed patron of the arts and philanthropist.

Renée became a Huguenot and Michelle translated psalms for her. Ercole disapproved of the French people's influence at his court. He removed many people in the court of Ferrara that he thought were dangerous or against the Catholic Church, but it was not easy to remove his wife's close companions.

Threats of violent treatment from Catholic husbands always posed a serious problem for women, and they frequently preferred to follow the reformed faith secretly within the safety of their lands or chateaux to lend support unobtrusively through offering patronage and protection to male leaders of the movement.

— Charmarie Jenkins Blaisdell, Calvin's Letters to Women: The Courting of Ladies in High Places

The Duke of Ferrara went on a long trip to Rome in 1535, providing a peaceful and productive work-period at the court. For instance, Marot's works became freer and bolder during this time. Ercole returned to Ferrara in 1536. Convinced that Michelle influenced Renée to distance herself from Catholicism, Ercole ordered the evacuation of Michelle and her daughters.

Marot wrote the epistles Epitres, XL and Epitres, XLI for Michelle and her daughter Renee, respectively to mark their loss from the court. He also wrote the song:

Come sweet weather, retire, wind,

Do not annoy Madame de Soubise: Enough she has annoying sadness

To abandon her lady and her mistress.

The duchess sequestered herself in her suite of apartments to avoid Ercole and the possibility of being poisoned.

Ultimately, he removed all of duchess's French companions. Beginning in 1540, Renée refused to go to confession or attend mass. In 1548, Ercole II imprisoned his wife.

== Poitou ==
From Ferrara, Michelle and her children settled on their property in Poitou. She educated her children, including teaching them about Protestantism. Her descendants were torchbearers for the Huguenots during the French Wars of Religion.

She lived in Saintonge. She died in 1549 in Saintonge.

== Legacy ==
Nancy L. Roelker, author of The Appeal of Calvinism to French Noblewomen in the Sixteenth Century, stated,

Michelle de Saubonne, known as Madame de Soubise, was the first woman of the high nobility known to have been converted to outright reform. A fearless widow with an abrasive personality, she was gouvernante and the principal influence on Renée de France (Princess of the Blood and later Duchess of Ferrara), among others, and was twice banished from court for her religious views.

== Bibliography ==
- Barton, Florence Whitfield (1989). Calvin and the duchess. Louisville, KY : Westminster/J. Knox Press. ISBN 978-0-8042-0874-1.
- Blaisdell, Charmarie Jenkins (1982). "Calvin's Letters to Women: The Courting of Ladies in High Places". The Sixteenth Century Journal. 13 (3). doi:10.2307/2539605.
- Henry, Guy (1910). Histoire de la poésie française au 16e siècle. T. 1-. Paris H. Champion.
- Joseph, George (1985). Clément Marot. Boston : Twayne Publishers. ISBN 978-0-8057-6600-4.
- Kamil, Neil (2020-03-03). Fortress of the Soul: Violence, Metaphysics, and Material Life in the Huguenots' New World, 1517-1751. JHU Press. ISBN 978-1-4214-2935-9.
- Minois, Georges (1999). Anne de Bretagne. Arthème Fayard. ISBN 9782213603346.

Court offices
Preceded by ?	Governess of the Children of France; 1510-1515	Succeeded by Charlotte Gouffier de Boisy
