= L'Amadigi =

1560 epic poem by Bernardo Tasso

L'Amadigi is an incomplete epic poem written in Italian by Bernardo Tasso and first published in 1560. It was inspired by the Amadís de Gaula of Garci Rodríguez de Montalvo.

The work was completed by Bernardo's son Torquato and published as Floridante (sometimes misspelt as Florindante) in 1587.
