= François de Sagon =

French priest and poet

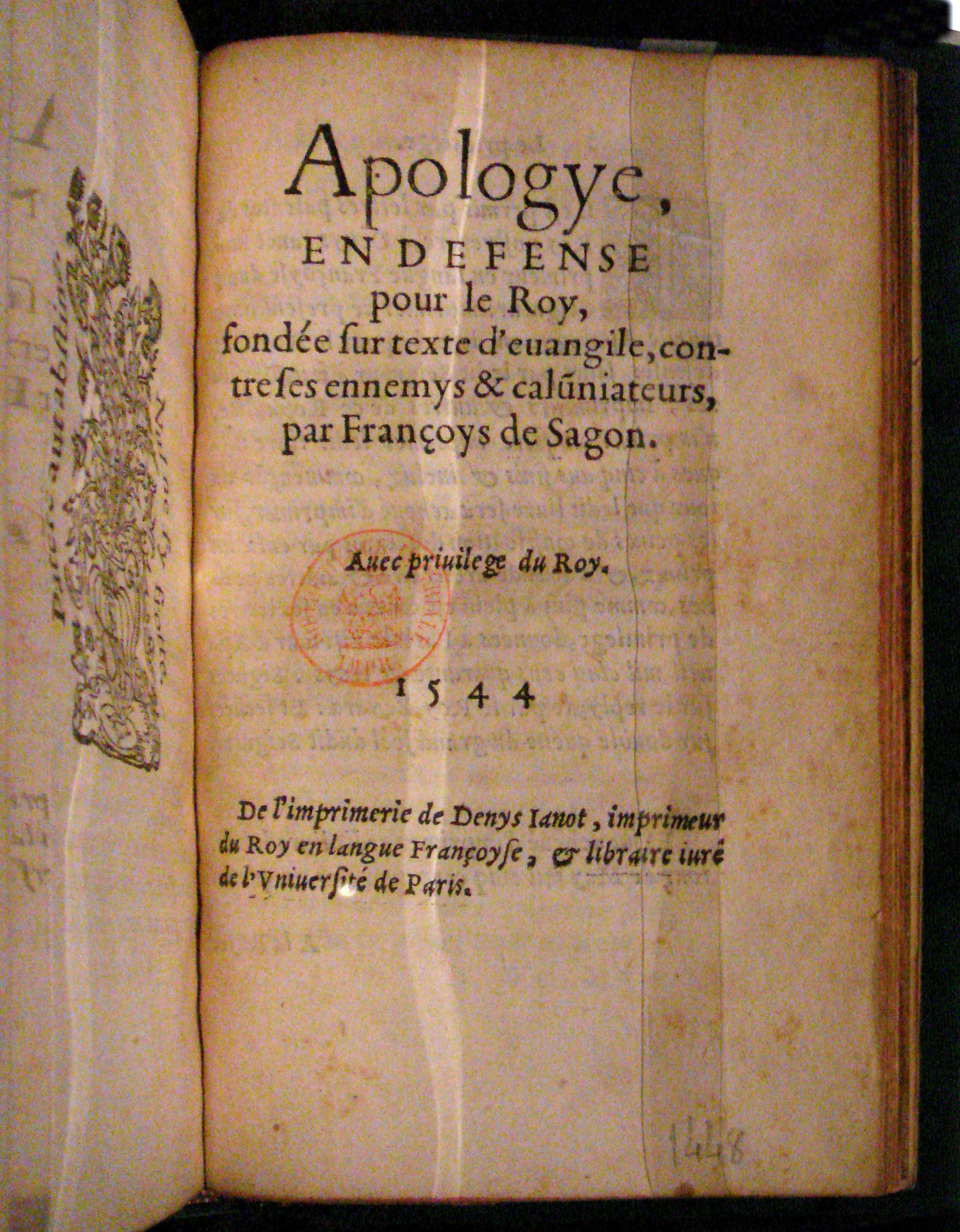
Apologye en défense pour le Roy, fondée sur texte d'évangile, contre ses enemis et calomniateurs by François de Sagon, 1544.

François de Sagon was a French priest and poet of the 16th century.

He was famous for his enmity with Clément Marot.

He published in 1544 Apologye en défense pour le Roy, a text defending the actions of Francis I in the Franco-Ottoman alliance, by drawing parallels with the Parable of the Good Samaritan in the Bible, in which Francis is compared to the wounded man, the Emperor to the thieves, and Suleiman to the Good Samaritan providing help to Francis.

== Works ==
- Le regret d'honneur féminin
- Apologye en défense pour le Roy
- Epistre à Marot
