= Clément Marot =

French poet (1496–1544)

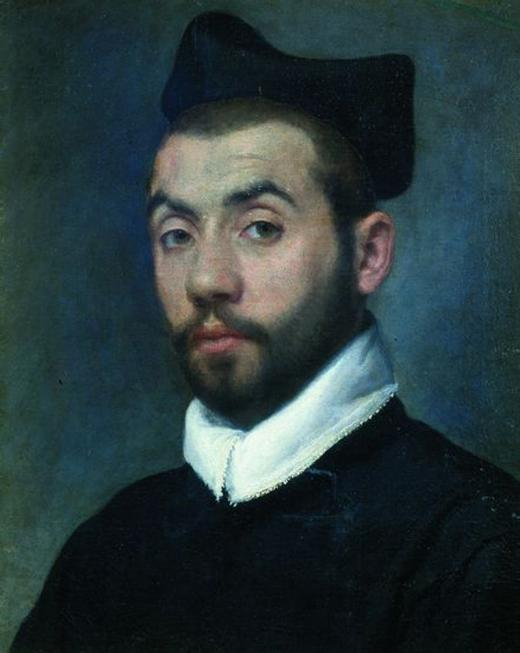
- Born: 23 November 1496
- Died: 12 September 1544 (aged 47)
- Occupation: Poet
- Writing career
- Language: Middle French
- Period: from 1512
- Genres: Poetry; translation; epistle
- Movements: Renaissance literature, Mannerism

Clément Marot (English: /mɑːˈroʊ/ mah-ROH, French: [klemɑ̃ maʁo]; 23 November 1496 – 12 September 1544) was a French Renaissance poet. He was influenced by the writers of the late 15th century and paved the way for the Pléiade, and is undoubtedly the most important poet at the court of Francis I. Despite the support of Marguerite de Valois-Angoulême (1492–1549), the king's sister, his strong leanings toward the Reformation led to several imprisonments and two periods of exile.

== Biography ==
=== Youth ===
Marot was born at Cahors, the capital of the province of Quercy, some time during the winter of 1496–1497. His father, Jean Marot (c. 1463-1523), whose more correct name appears to have been des Mares, Marais or Marets, was a Norman from the Caen region and was also a poet. Jean held the post of escripvain (a cross between poet laureate and historiographer) to Anne of Brittany, Queen of France. Clément was the child of his second wife. The boy was "brought into France" — it is his own expression, and is not unnoteworthy as showing the strict sense in which that term was still used at the beginning of the 16th century — in 1506. He appears to have been educated at the University of Paris, and to have then begun studying law. Jean Marot instructed his son in the fashionable forms of verse-making, which called for some formal training.

It was the time of the rhétoriqueurs, poets who combined stilted language with a fondness for the allegorical manner of the 15th century and the most complicated and artificial forms of the ballade and the rondeau. Clément began as a "rhétoriqueur", though he later helped overthrow this style. He wrote panegyrics to Guillaume Crétin and translated Virgil's first eclogue in 1512. He soon gave up the study of law and became page to Nicolas de Neufville, seigneur de Villeroy, which led to his introduction into court life. The house of Valois, which would hold the throne of France for the greater part of a century, was devoted to literature.

=== At the French court ===
As early as 1514, before the accession of King Francis I, Clément presented to him his Judgment of Minos, and shortly afterward he was either styled or styled himself facteur (poet) de la reine to Queen Claude. In 1519 he was attached to the suite of Marguerite d'Alençon, the king's sister, (later to become Marguerite de Navarre), a great patron of the arts. He was also a great favourite of Francis himself, attended the Field of the Cloth of Gold in 1520, and duly celebrated it in verse. In the next year he was at the camp in Flanders, and wrote of the horrors of war.

Marot, like most of Marguerite's literary court, was attracted by her grace, her kindness, and her intellectual accomplishments, but there is no grounds for thinking that they had a romantic relationship. During this time his poetic style began to change, becoming much less artificial. Some of his poems praise a lady named "Diane", whom some have identified with Diane de Poitiers.

=== In Paris ===
In 1524, Marot accompanied King Francis on his disastrous Italian campaign. The king was taken prisoner at the Battle of Pavia, but there are no grounds for supposing that Marot was wounded or shared the king's fate, and he was back in Paris again by the beginning of 1525. However, Marguerite for intellectual reasons, and her brother for political, had until then favoured the double movement of "Aufklärung", partly humanist, partly reforming, which distinguished the beginning of the century. Formidable opposition to both forms of innovation now began to appear, and Marot, never particularly prudent, was arrested on a charge of heresy and lodged in the Grand Châtelet in February 1526. This was only a foretaste of his coming trouble, and a friendly prelate, acting for Marguerite, arranged his release before Easter. The imprisonment caused him to write a vigorous poem entitled Enfer (hell), later imitated by his friend Étienne Dolet. His father died about this time, and Marot seems to have been appointed in Jean's place as valet de chambre to the king. He was certainly a member of the royal household in 1528 with a stipend of 250 livres. In 1530, probably, he married. The following year he was once again in trouble, this time for attempting to rescue a prisoner, and was again released, this time after Marot wrote the king one of his most famous poems, appealing for his release.

In 1532 he published (it had perhaps appeared three years earlier), under the title of Adolescence Clémentine, the first printed collection of his works, which was very popular and was frequently reprinted with additions. Unfortunately, the poet's enemies ensured that Marot was implicated in the 1534 Affair of the Placards, and this time he fled.

=== In Ferrara ===
He passed through Nérac, the court of Navarre, and made his way to Renée, duchess of Ferrara, a supporter of the Protestant Reformation in France—as steadfast as her sister-in-law Marguerite, and even more efficacious, because her dominions were outside France. At Ferrara his work there included the celebrated Blasons (a descriptive poem, improved upon medieval models), which set all the verse-writers of France imitating them. The blason was defined by Thomas Sébillet as a perpetual praise or continuous vituperation of its subject. The blasons of Marot's followers were printed in 1543 with the title of Blasons anatomiques du corps féminin.

=== Back in Paris ===
Duchess Renée was not able to persuade her husband, Ercole d'Este, to share her views, and Marot had to leave Ferrara. He went to Venice, but before very long Pope Paul III remonstrated with Francis I on the severity with which the Protestants were treated, and they were allowed to return to Paris on condition of recanting their errors. Marot returned with the rest, and abjured his heresy at Lyon. In 1539 Francis gave him a house and grounds in the suburbs.

It was at this time that his famous and influential translations of the Psalms appeared. Each courtier identified his or her favorite psalms, and the poems were sung in the court and in the city. When the Emperor Charles V visited Paris, he rewarded Marot with 200 gold doublons for his translations, and requested Marot to translate one of his special favourites – psalm 107 or 118. It is said, probably with exaggeration, that these translations did more than anything else to advance the cause of the Protestant Reformation in France. Marot's translations of the Psalms continued to be sung for centuries by Protestant congregations.

=== Later life ===
At the same time Marot engaged in a literary quarrel with a poet named François de Sagon, who represented the Sorbonne. Verse-writers of France aligned themselves as Marotiques or Sagontiques, and abuse was exchanged. Victory, as far as wit was concerned, was with Marot, but at the cost of ill-will against him. Marot also edited the works of his fellow poet François Villon.

Although the Psalms were published in 1541 and 1543 with royal privilege, the Sorbonne still objected to translations from the Bible into French. In 1543, it was evident that Marot could not rely on the protection of the king; therefore he left for Geneva. After living and working on the Psalms there, as Calvin became more influential, he went to Piedmont. He died at Turin in the autumn of 1544 and was buried in the Cathedral there at the expense of the French ambassador to Rome.

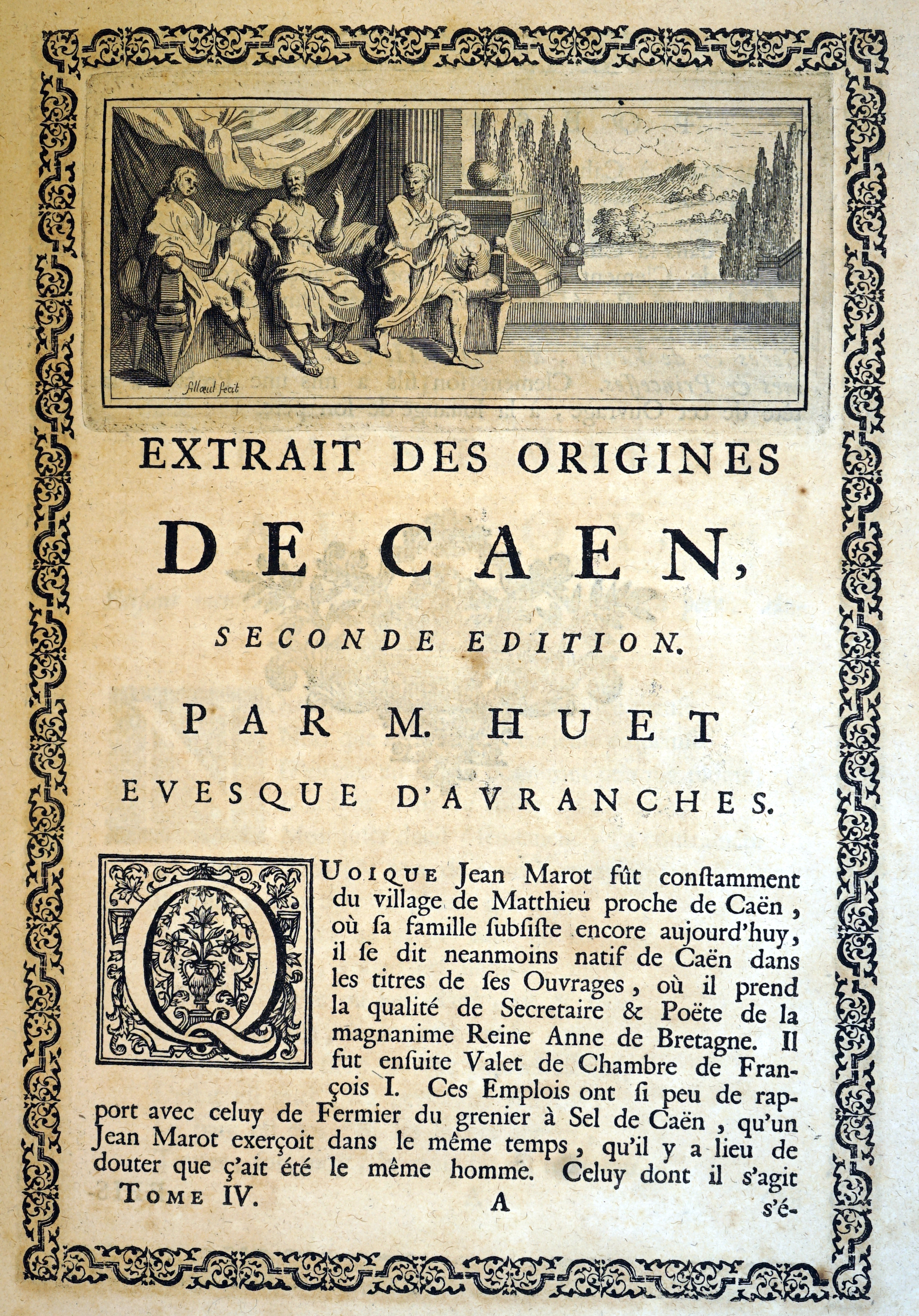
Published in 1731 with article by the Bishop of Avranches Huet and an engraving by Pierre Filloeul .

== Editions ==
The most important early editions of Marot's Œuvres were published at Lyon in 1538 and 1544. In the second of these the arrangement of his poems which has been accepted in later issues was first adopted; in 1596 an enlarged edition was edited by François Mizière. The Parisian printer Denis Janot, however, also printed several important editions of books by Marot. Others of later date are those of Nicolas Lenglet Du Fresnoy (The Hague, 1731) and P. Jannet (1868–1872; new ed., 1873–1876), on the whole the best, but there is a very good selection with a still better introduction by Charles d'Héricault, the joint editor of the Jannet edition in the larger Collection Garnier (no date). From an elaborate edition by G. Guiffrey only Vol. II and III appeared during his lifetime. Robert Yve-Plessis and Jean Plattard completed the edition in 5 vols (Paris, 1874–1931). The first 'scientific' edition is by C. A. Mayer in 6 vols.(1958–1980), which follows the arrangement of the material in 'genres' (like the edition 1544). The last complete scientific edition is by Gérard Defaux in 2 vols. (1990–92). Defaux adopts the editing principles of Marot himself, as deducible from his own 1538 edition, mentioned above.

== Influence ==
Many of Marot's texts were set as chansons, particularly by his contemporary Claudin de Sermisy. His contemporary, the composer Claude Goudimel set Marot's metrical translations of the psalms for four voices – twice : once in simply homophonic harmony and in a second publication more contrapuntally. Twentieth century composer Angèle Ravizé also used Marot's texts for two vocal quartets.

Douglas Hofstadter's book Le Ton beau de Marot deals with the problems of translation, and includes several dozen different translations of Marot's poem A une damoyselle malade.

Both Maurice Ravel and George Enescu composed song settings of Marot's poems.

Wilhelm Killmayer set one of his poems in his song cycle Rêveries in 1953, and another in Blasons anatomiques du corps féminin in 1968.
