= Torquato Tasso =

Italian poet (1544–1595)

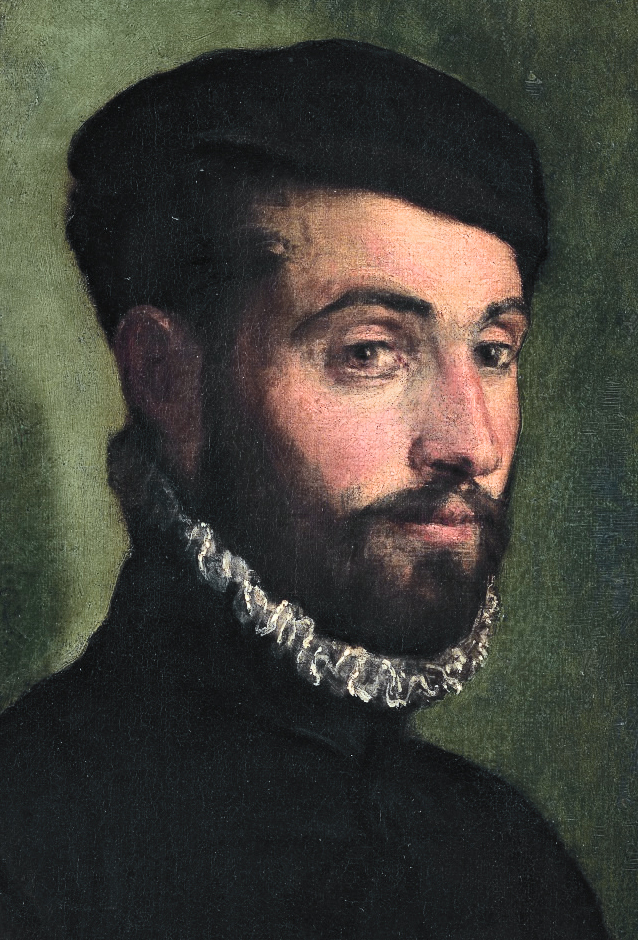
- Portrait of Torquato Tasso, aged 22, by Jacopo Bassano
- Born: 11 March 1544; Sorrento, Kingdom of Naples
- Died: 25 April 1595 (aged 51); Rome, Papal States
- Occupation: Poet
- Parents: Bernardo Tasso; Porzia de Rossi
- Writing career
- Language: Italian
- Genres: Epic poetry; lyric poetry; dialogue; treatise
- Movements: Renaissance literature, Mannerism

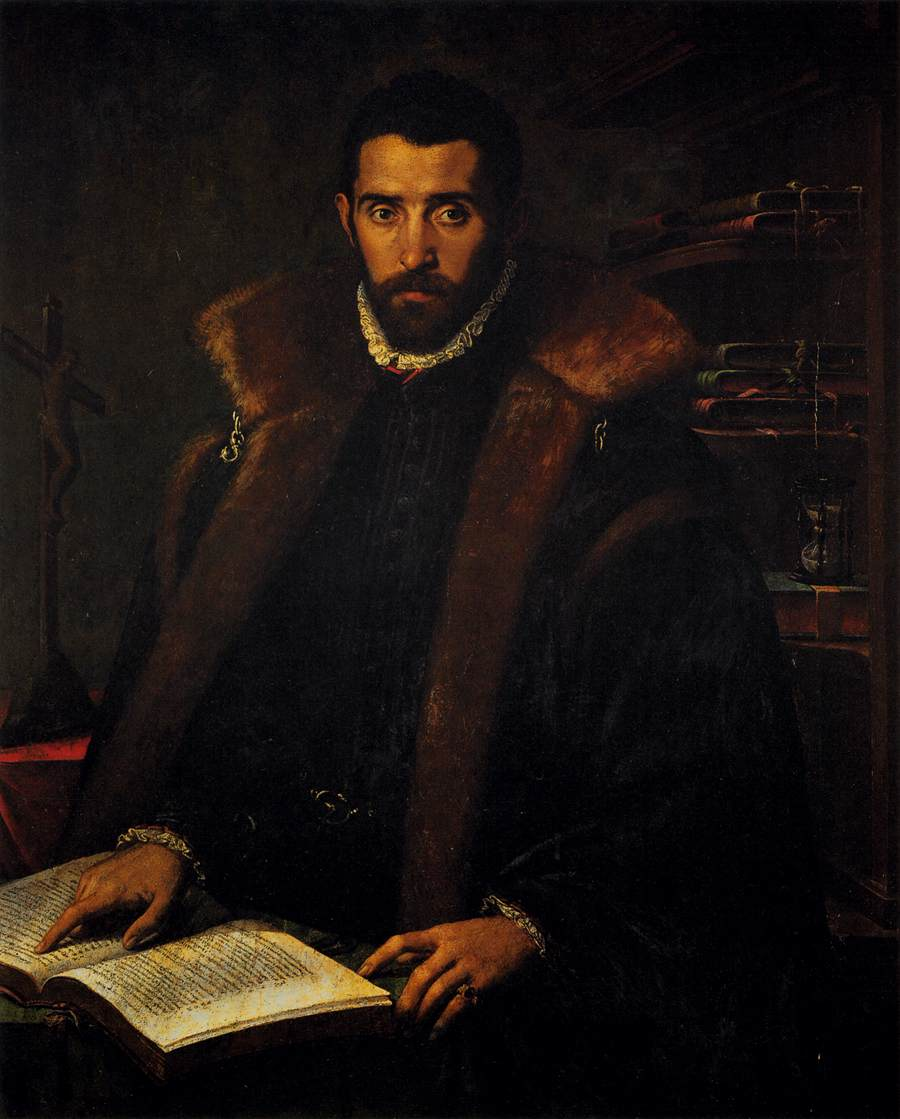
Portrait of Torquato Tasso, 1590s

Torquato Tasso (/ˈtæsoʊ/ TASS-oh, also US: /ˈtɑːsoʊ/ TAH-soh; Italian: [torˈkwaːto ˈtasso]; 11 March 1544 – 25 April 1595) was an Italian poet of the 16th century, known for his 1581 poem Gerusalemme liberata (Jerusalem Delivered), in which he depicts a highly imaginative version of the combats between Christians and Muslims at the end of the First Crusade, during the Siege of Jerusalem of 1099.

Tasso had a mental illness and died a few days before he was to be crowned on the Capitoline Hill as the king of poets by Pope Clement VIII. His work was widely translated and adapted, and until the beginning of the 20th century, he remained one of the most widely read poets in Europe.

== Biography ==
=== Early life ===
Born in Sorrento, Torquato was the son of Bernardo Tasso, a nobleman of Bergamo and an epic and lyric poet of considerable fame in his day, and his wife Porzia de' Rossi, a noblewoman born in Naples of Tuscan origins. His father had for many years been secretary in the service of Ferrante Sanseverino, Prince of Salerno, and his mother was closely connected with the most illustrious Neapolitan families. When, during the boy's childhood, the prince of Salerno came into collision with the Spanish government of Naples, being subsequently outlawed and deprived of his hereditary fiefs, Tasso's father shared his patron's fate. He was proclaimed a rebel to the state, along with his son Torquato, and his patrimony was sequestered. In 1552, Torquato was living with his mother and his only sister Cornelia at Naples, pursuing his education under the Jesuits, who had recently opened a school there. The precocity of intellect and the religious fervour of the boy attracted general admiration. At the age of eight, he was already famous.

Soon after this date, he was allowed to join his father, who then lived in great poverty and unemployment in exile in Rome. News reached them in 1556 that Porzia Tasso had died suddenly and mysteriously at Naples. Her husband was firmly convinced that she had been poisoned by her brother with the object of getting control over her property.

As it subsequently happened, Porzia's estate never descended to her son, and the daughter Cornelia married below her birth, at the instigation of her maternal relatives. Tasso's father was a poet by predilection and a professional courtier. Therefore, when an opening at the court of Urbino was offered in 1557, Bernardo Tasso gladly accepted it.

The young Torquato, a handsome and brilliant lad, became the companion in sports and studies of Francesco Maria della Rovere, heir to the duke of Urbino. At Urbino, a society of cultivated men pursued the aesthetic and literary studies which were then in vogue. Bernardo Tasso read cantos of his poem L'Amadigi to the duchess and her ladies, or discussed the merits of Homer and Virgil, Trissino and Ariosto, with the duke's librarians and secretaries. Torquato grew up in an atmosphere of refined luxury and somewhat pedantic criticism, both of which gave a permanent tone to his character.

In Venice, where his father went to superintend the printing of his own epic, L'Amadigi (1560), these influences continued. He found himself the pet and prodigy of a distinguished literary circle, but Bernardo had suffered in his own career so seriously from dependence on his writings and the nobility that he now determined on a lucrative profession for his son. Torquato was sent to study law at Padua. Instead of applying himself to law, the young man bestowed all his attention upon philosophy and poetry. Before the end of 1562, he had produced a twelve-canto epic poem called Rinaldo, which was meant to combine the regularity of the Virgilian with the attractions of the romantic epic. In the attainment of this object, and in all the minor qualities of style and handling, Rinaldo showed marked originality, although other parts seem unfinished and betray the haste in which the poem was composed. Nevertheless, its author was recognised as the most promising young poet of his time. The flattered father allowed the work to be printed, and, after a short period of study at Bologna, he consented to his son's entering the service of Cardinal Luigi d'Este. Even before that date, the young Tasso had been a frequent visitor at the Este court in Ferrara, where in 1561 he had encountered Lucrezia Bendidio, one of Eleanora d'Este's ladies-in-waiting, and fallen in love with her. She became the addressee of his first series of love sonnets, to be followed in 1563 by Laura Peperara, the next object of Tasso's affections. Both Lucrezia and Laura had, in the meantime, become well-known singers, and for a while Tasso seems to have courted them both.

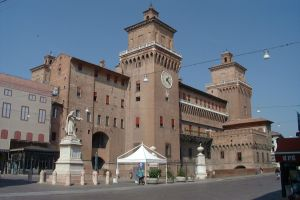
Castello degli Estensi, Ferrara

=== France and Ferrara ===
From 1565, Tasso's life was centred on the castle at Ferrara, the scene of many later glories and cruel sufferings. After the publication of Rinaldo he had expressed his views upon the epic in some Discourses on the Art of Poetry, which committed him to a distinct theory and gained for him the additional celebrity of a philosophical critic. The next five years seem to have been the happiest of Tasso's life, although his father's death in 1569 caused his affectionate nature profound pain. Young, handsome, accomplished in all the exercises of a well-bred gentleman, accustomed to the society of the great and learned, illustrious by his published works in verse and prose, he became the idol of the most brilliant court in Italy. The first two books of his five-hundred-odd love poems were addressed to Lucrezia Bendidio and Laura Peverara. The princesses Lucrezia and Eleonora d'Este, both unmarried, both his seniors by about ten years, took him under their protection. He was admitted to their familiarity. He owed much to the constant kindness of both sisters. In 1570, he travelled to Paris with the cardinal.

Frankness of speech and a certain habitual want of tact caused a disagreement with his worldly patron. He left France next year and took service under Duke Alfonso II of Ferrara, the Cardinal's brother. The most important events in Tasso's biography during the following four years are the completion of Aminta in 1573 and Gerusalemme Liberata in 1574. Aminta is a pastoral drama of very simple plot, but of exquisite lyrical charm. It appeared at the moment when music, under the influence of composers like Palestrina, Monteverdi, Marenzio, and others, was becoming the dominant art of Italy. The honeyed melodies and sensuous melancholy of Aminta exactly suited and interpreted the spirit of its age. Its influence, in opera and cantata, was felt through two successive centuries. Aminta, played by courtiers in an island of Po river where the duke had his Giardino di delizie, was first printed by Aldus Manutius the Younger in Venice in January 1581. A Croatian translation of Aminta by the poet Dominko Zlatarić, Ljubmir, pripovijest pastijerska, was printed one year before the original, also in Venice.

=== The Gerusalemme Liberata ===
The Gerusalemme Liberata or Jerusalem Delivered occupies a larger space in the history of European literature, and is a more considerable work. Yet the commanding qualities of this epic poem, those which revealed Tasso's individuality, and which made it immediately pass into the rank of classics, beloved by the people no less than by persons of culture, are akin to the lyrical graces of Aminta.

In the Gerusalemme Liberata, as in the Rinaldo, Tasso aimed at ennobling the Italian epic style by preserving the strict unity of plot and heightening poetic diction. He chose Virgil for his model, took the First Crusade for subject, infused the fervour of religion into his conception of the hero, Godfrey. But his natural bent was for romance.

As he had done in Rinaldo, Tasso adorned Gerusalemme Liberata with a number of romantic episodes, which have proved more popular and influential than the grand sweep of the main theme. Thus, while the nominal hero of Gerusalemme Liberata is Godfrey of Bouillon ("Goffredo"), the leader of the First Crusade, and the climax of the epic is the capture of the holy city, Tasso's Goffredo, who is a mixture of Virgil's pious Aeneas and Tridentine Catholicism, is not the real hero of the epic. Instead, the reader is attracted to the stories of Ruggiero, fiery and passionate Rinaldo, melancholy and impulsive Tancredi, and also by the chivalrous Saracens with whom they clash in love and war.

The action of the epic turns on three stories of interaction between noble, beautiful pagan women and these Crusaders. Armida, a beautiful witch, is sent forth by the infernal senate to sow discord in the Christian camp. Instead, she is converted to the true faith by her adoration for a crusading knight, and quits the scene with a phrase of the Virgin Mary on her lips. Clorinda, a brave female warrior, dons armor like Ariosto's Marfisa, fights a duel with her devoted lover, and receives baptism at his hands as she lies dying. Finally, Erminia, hopelessly in love with Tancredi, seeks refuge in the shepherds' hut.

These stories rivet the reader's attention, while the battles, religious ceremonies, conclaves and stratagems of the campaign are less engaging. Tasso's great invention as an artist was the poetry of sentiment. Sentiment, not sentimentality, gives value to what is immortal in the Gerusalemme. It was a new thing in the 16th century, something concordant with a growing feeling for woman and with the ascendant art of music. This sentiment, refined, noble, natural, steeped in melancholy, exquisitely graceful, pathetically touching, breathes throughout the episodes of the Gerusalemme, finds metrical expression in the languishing cadence of its mellifluous verse, and sustains the ideal life of those seductive heroines whose names were familiar as household words to all Europe in the 17th and 18th centuries.

The epic was finished in Tasso's thirty-first year; when the manuscripts lay before him, the best part of his life was over, his best work had already been accomplished. Troubles immediately began to gather round him. Instead of having the courage to obey his own instinct, and to publish the Gerusalemme as he had conceived it, he yielded to the excessive scrupulosity which formed a feature of his paranoid character. The poem was sent in manuscript to a large committee of eminent literary men, Tasso expressing his willingness to hear their strictures and to adopt their suggestions unless he could convert them to his own views. The result was that each of these candid friends, while expressing in general high admiration for the epic, took some exception to its plot, its title, its moral tone, its episodes or its diction, in detail. One wished it to be more regularly classical; another wanted more romance. One hinted that the Inquisition would not tolerate its supernatural machinery; another demanded the excision of its most charming passages, the loves of Armida, Clorinda and Erminia. Tasso had to defend himself against all these ineptitudes and pedantries, and to accommodate his practice to the theories he had rashly expressed.

Tasso's self-chosen critics were not men to admit what the public has since accepted as incontrovertible. They vaguely felt that a great and beautiful romantic poem was embedded in a dull and not very correct epic. In their uneasiness, they suggested every course but the right one, which was to publish the Gerusalemme without further dispute.

Tasso, already overworked by his precocious studies, by exciting court life and exhausting literary industry, now grew almost mad with worry. His health began to fail him. He complained of headache, malarious fevers, and wished to leave Ferrara. The Gerusalemme was laid in manuscript upon a shelf. He opened negotiations with the court of Florence for an exchange of service. This irritated the duke of Ferrara. Alfonso hated nothing more than to see courtiers (especially famous ones) leave him for a rival duchy. Moreover, Alfonso was married to a French Calvinist princess and thus justly worried about antagonising the more orthodox powers in Italy, concentrated in Florence and Rome.

=== Difficult relationships in the Court of Ferrara ===
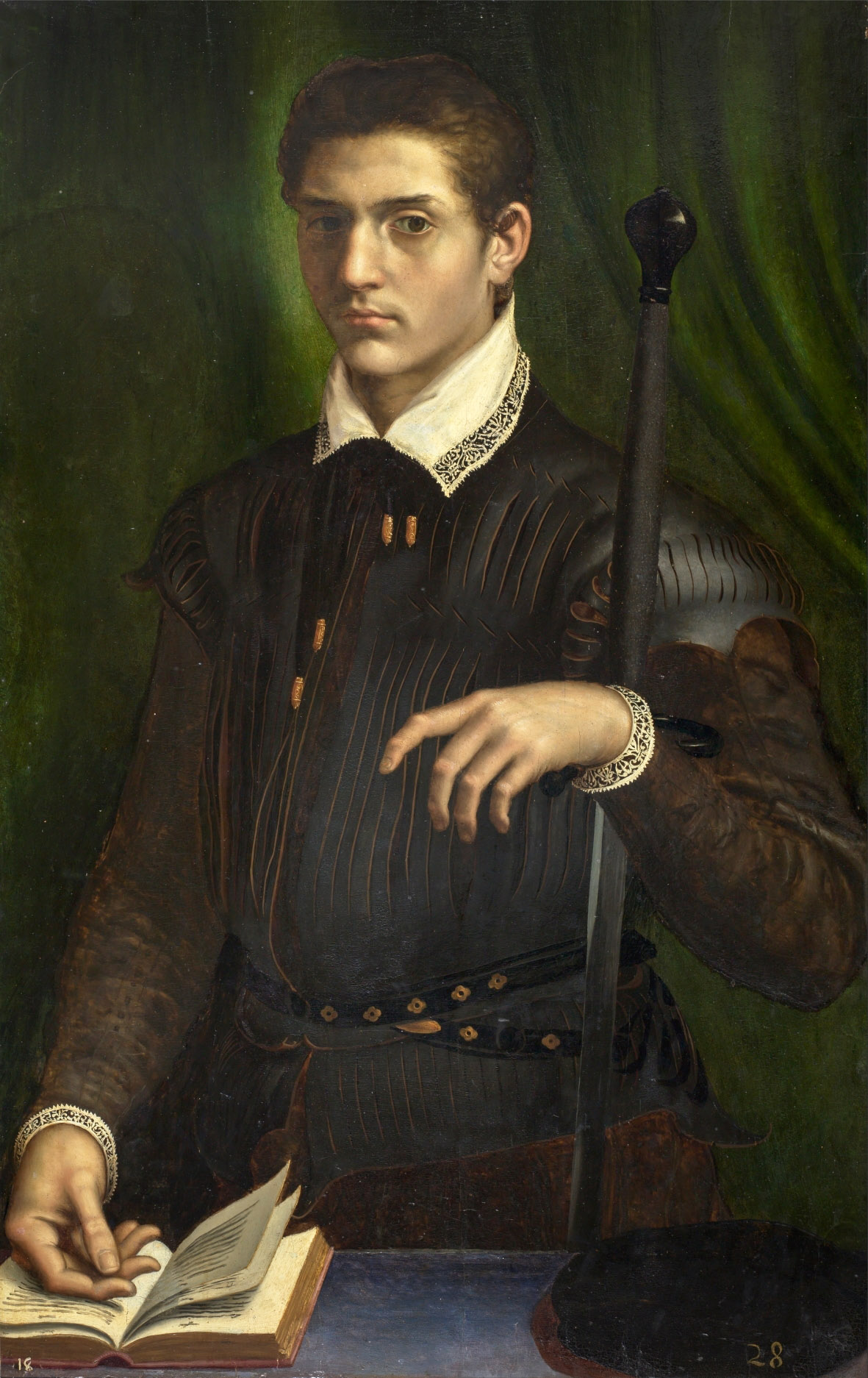
Alfonso II d'Este, portrait by Girolamo da Carpi

Alfonso thought, moreover, that, if Tasso were allowed to go, the Medici would get the coveted dedication of that already famous epic. Therefore, he bore with the poet's humours and so contrived that the latter should have no excuse for quitting Ferrara. Meanwhile, through the years 1575, 1576 and 1577, Tasso's health grew worse.

Jealousy inspired the courtiers to malign and insult him. His irritable and suspicious temper, vain and sensitive to slights, rendered him only too easy a prey to their malevolence.

In the course of the 1570s, Tasso developed a persecution mania which led to legends about the restless, half-mad, and misunderstood author. He became consumed by thoughts that his servants betrayed his confidence, fancied he had been denounced to the Inquisition, and expected daily to be poisoned. Literary and political events surrounding him upset his mental state, escalating his stress and social troubles.

In the autumn of 1576, Tasso quarrelled with a Ferrarese gentleman, Maddalo, who had talked too freely about some same-sex love affair; the same year, he wrote a letter to his homosexual friend Luca Scalabrino dealing with his own love for a 21-year-old young man, Orazio Ariosto; (Note: "I love him, and I'm ready to love him for several months, because the impression of this love into my soul is too much strong, and is impossible to erase it in a few days... I call my feeling 'love' and not just affection, because after all love it is. I wasn't aware of that before, because I didn't yet feel inside me none of those sexual appetites that love generally awakes, not even when we were in bed together. But now I clearly perceive that I have been and is not a friend, but a quite honest lover, because I feel a terrible pain, not only because he doesn't respond to my love, but also because I can't talk with him with that freedom I was used to, and being far from him pains me very much." Giovannai Dall'Orto: Torquato Tasso) in the summer of 1577, he drew his knife upon a servant in the presence of Lucrezia d'Este, duchess of Urbino. For this excess, he was arrested; but the duke released him, and took him for a change of air to his country seat of Villa Belriguardo. What happened there is not known. Some biographers have surmised that a compromising liaison with Leonora d'Este came to light, and that Tasso agreed to feign madness in order to cover her honour, but of this, there is no proof. It is only certain that from Belriguardo he returned to a Franciscan convent at Ferrara, for the express purpose of attending to his health. There, the dread of being murdered by the duke took a firm hold on his mind. He escaped at the end of July, disguised himself as a peasant, and went on foot to his sister at Sorrento.

The conclusions were that Tasso, after the beginning of 1575, developed a mental malady, which, without amounting to actual insanity, rendered him fantastical and insupportable, a cause of anxiety to his patrons. There is no evidence whatsoever for the later romantic myth that this state of things was due to an overwhelming passion for Leonora. The duke, contrary to his image as a tyrant, showed considerable forbearance. Though a rigid and unsympathetic man, as egotistical as any princeling of his era, to Tasso, he was never cruel; unintelligent perhaps, but far from being that monster of ferocity as he was later portrayed. The subsequent history of his connection with the poet corroborates this view.

While with his sister at Sorrento, Tasso yearned for Ferrara. The court-made man could not breathe freely outside its charmed circle. He wrote humbly requesting to be taken back. Alfonso consented, provided Tasso would agree to undergo a medical course of treatment for his melancholy. When he returned, which he did with alacrity under those conditions, he was well received by the ducal family.

All might have gone well if his old maladies had not revived. Scene followed scene of irritability, moodiness, suspicion, wounded vanity and violent outbursts.

=== In the madhouse of St. Anna ===
In the summer of 1578, he ran away again, travelling through Mantua, Padua, Venice, and Urbino Lombardy. In September, he reached the gates of Turin on foot and was courteously entertained by Emmanuel Philibert, Duke of Savoy. Wherever he went, wandering like the world's rejected guest, he met with the honour due his illustrious name. Great folk gladly opened their houses to him, partly in compassion, partly in admiration of his genius. But he soon wearied of their society and wore their kindness thin by his querulous peevishness. It seemed, moreover, that life was intolerable to him outside Ferrara. Accordingly, he once more opened negotiations with the duke, and in February 1579, he again set foot in the castle.

Alfonso was about to contract his third marriage, this time with a princess of the house of Mantua. He had no children, and unless he got an heir, there was a probability that his state would fall to the Holy See, as in fact it eventually did. The nuptial festivals, on the eve of which Tasso arrived, were therefore not an occasion of great rejoicing for the elderly bridegroom. As a forlorn hope, Alfonso had to wed a third wife, but his heart was not in it, and his expectations were far from sanguine.

Tasso, preoccupied as always with his own sorrows and his own sense of dignity, made no allowance for the troubles of his master. Rooms below his rank, he thought, had been assigned him; the Duke was engaged. Without exercising common patience or giving his old friends the benefit of the doubt, Tasso broke into terms of open abuse, behaved like a lunatic, and was sent off without ceremony to the madhouse of St. Anna. This happened in March 1579, and there he remained until July 1586. Duke Alfonso's long patience at last had given way. He firmly believed that Tasso was insane, and he felt that if he were so, St. Anna was the safest place for him.

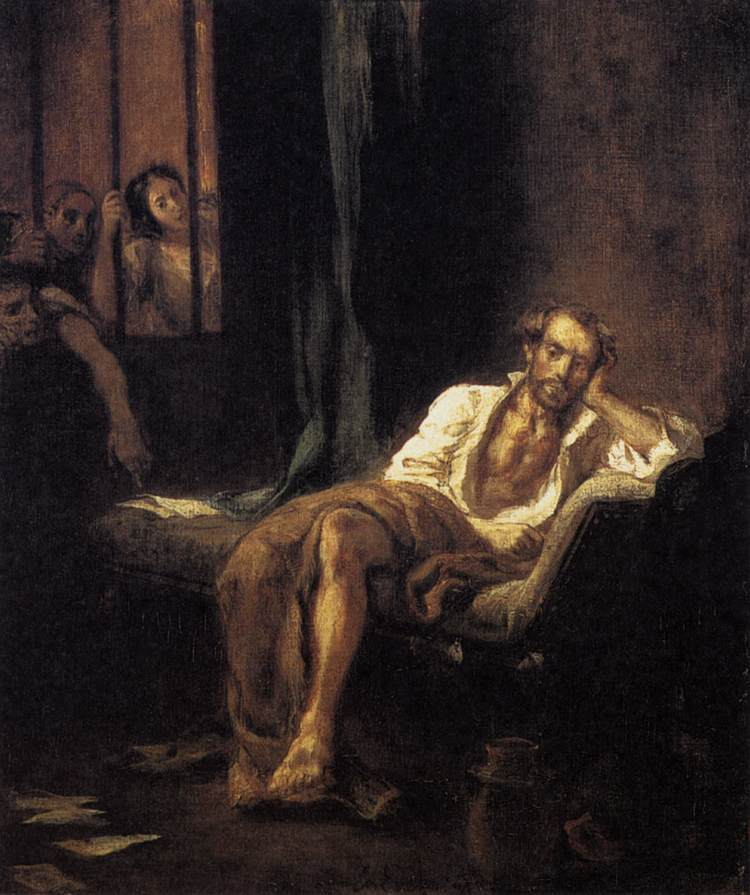
Tasso in the Hospital of St. Anna at Ferrara by Eugène Delacroix. Tasso spent the years 1579–1586 in the madhouse of St. Anne.

After the first few months of his incarceration, he obtained spacious apartments, received the visits of friends, went abroad, attended by responsible persons of his acquaintance, and was allowed to correspond freely with others. The letters written from St. Anna to the princes and cities of Italy, to warm well-wishers, and to men of the highest reputation in the world of art and learning, form the most valuable source of information, not only on his then condition, but also on his temperament at large. It is singular that he spoke always respectfully, even affectionately, of the Duke. Some critics have attempted to make it appear that he was hypocritically kissing the hand which had chastised him, with the view of being released from prison, but no one who has impartially considered the whole tone and tenor of his epistles will adopt this opinion. What emerges clearly from them is that he laboured under a serious mental disease, and that he was conscious of it.

Meanwhile, he occupied his uneasy leisure with copious compositions. The mass of his prose dialogues on philosophical and ethical themes, which is very considerable, belongs to the years of imprisonment in St. Anna. Except for occasional odes or sonnets—some written at request, others inspired by his keen sense of suffering and therefore poignant- he neglected poetry. In the year 1580, he heard that part of the Gerusalemme was being published without his permission and without his corrections. The following year, the whole poem was given to the world, and in the following six months, seven editions were issued from the press.

The prisoner of St. Anna had no control over his editors, and from the masterpiece which placed him on the level of Petrarch and Ariosto he never derived one penny of pecuniary profit. A rival poet at the court of Ferrara undertook to revise and edit his lyrics in 1582. This was Battista Guarini; and Tasso, in his cell, had to allow odes and sonnets, poems of personal feeling, occasional pieces of compliment, to be collected and emended, without lifting a voice in the matter.

A few years later, in 1585, two Florentine pedants of the Crusca Academy declared war against the Gerusalemme. They loaded it with insults, which seem to those who read their pamphlets now mere parodies of criticism. Yet Tasso felt bound to reply, and he did so with a moderation and urbanity which proved him to have been not only in full possession of his reasoning faculties, but a gentleman of noble manners also. The man, like Hamlet, was distraught through ill accommodation to his circumstances and his age; brain-sick he was undoubtedly, and this is the Duke of Ferrara's justification for the treatment he endured. In the prison, he bore himself pathetically, peevishly, but never ignobly.

What remained over, untouched by the malady, unoppressed by his consciousness thereof, displayed a sweet and gravely-toned humanity. The oddest thing about his life in prison is that he was always trying to place his two nephews, the sons of his sister Cornelia, in court service. One of them he attached to Guglielmo I, Duke of Mantua, the other to Ottavio Farnese, Duke of Parma.

=== Late years ===
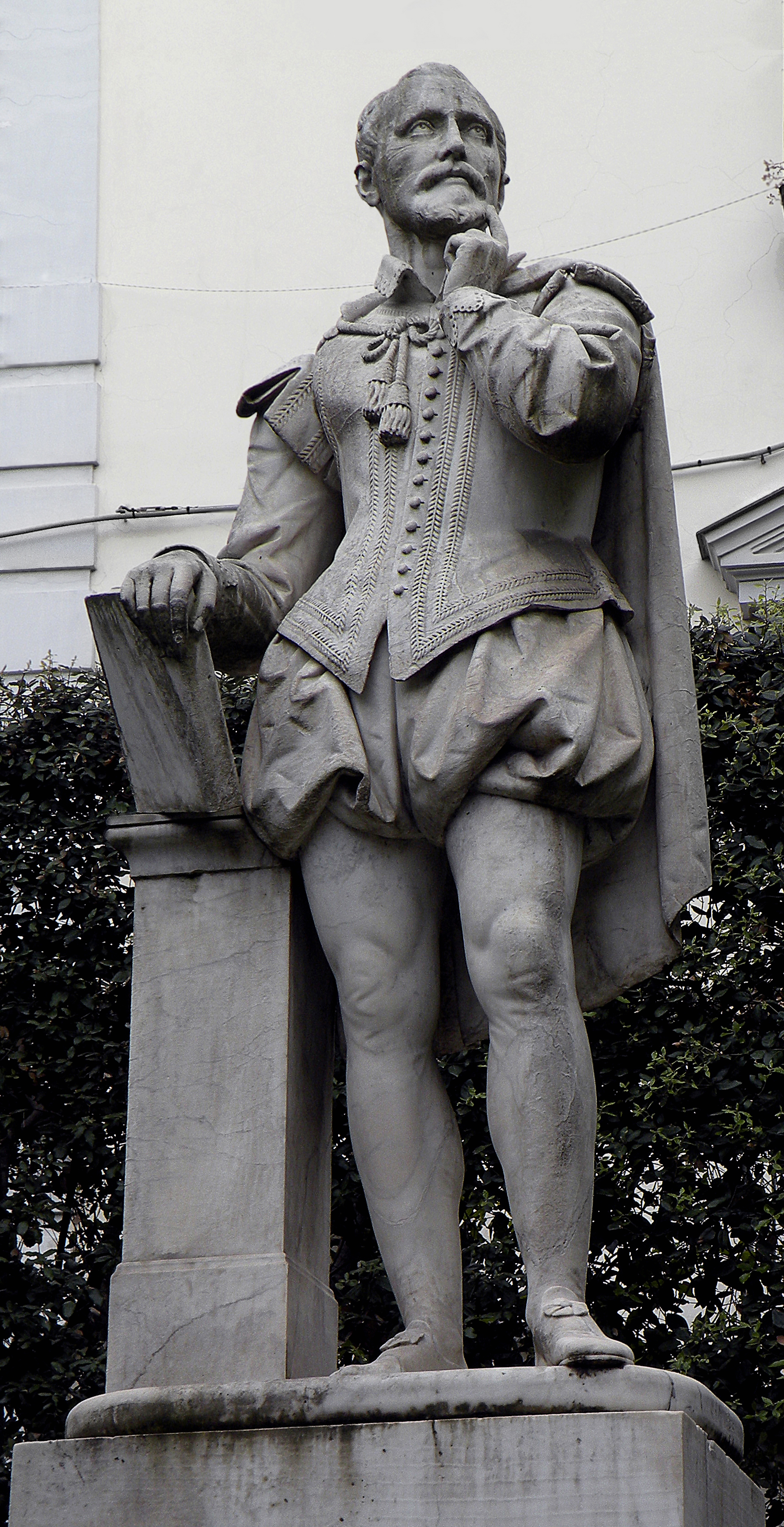
Torquato Tasso monument in Sorrento

In 1586, Tasso left St. Anna at the solicitation of Vincenzo Gonzaga, Prince of Mantua. He followed his young deliverer to the city by the Mincio, basked awhile in liberty and courtly pleasures, enjoyed a splendid reception from his paternal town of Bergamo, and reworked his 1573 tragedy Galealto Re di Norvegia into a classical drama entitled Torrismondo. But only a few months passed before he grew discontented. Vincenzo Gonzaga, succeeding to his father's dukedom of Mantua, had scanty leisure to bestow upon the poet. Tasso felt neglected. In the autumn of 1587, he journeyed through Bologna and Loreto to Rome, where he took up quarters with an old friend, Scipione Gonzaga, now Patriarch of Jerusalem. The following year he wandered off to Naples, where he wrote several religious poems, including Monte Oliveto. In 1589 he returned to Rome and took quarters again with the patriarch of Jerusalem. But the servants found Tasso insufferable and turned him out of doors. He fell ill and went to a hospital. The patriarch in 1590 again received him, but Tasso's restless spirit drove him forth to Florence. The Florentines said, "Actum est de eo." Rome once more, then Mantua, then Florence, then Rome, then Naples, then Rome, then Naples—such is the weary record of the years 1590–94. He endured a veritable Odyssey of malady, indigence and misfortune. To Tasso, everything was amiss. Though the palaces of princes, cardinals, patriarchs, nay popes, were always open to him, he could rest in none.

His health grew ever feebler, and his genius dimmer. In 1592, he published a revised version of the Gerusalemme, Gerusalemme Conquistata. All that made the poem of his early manhood charming, he rigidly erased. The versification became more pedantic; the romantic and magical episodes were excised; the heavier elements of the plot underwent dull rhetorical development. During the same year, a blank-verse retelling of Genesis, called Le Sette Giornate, saw the light.

Though mental disorder, physical weakness, and a decline in inspiration seemed to doom Tasso to oblivion, hope cheered his last years. Pope Clement VIII ascended the papal chair in 1592. He and his nephew, Cardinal Aldobrandini of San Giorgio, were determined to befriend the poet. In 1594, they invited him to Rome. There, Tasso was to receive the crown of laurels, as Petrarch had been crowned, on the Capitol.

Worn out with illness, Tasso reached Rome in November. The ceremony of his coronation was deferred because Cardinal Aldobrandini had fallen ill. But the pope assigned Tasso a pension. Also, under pontifical pressure, Prince Avellino (who held Tasso's maternal estate) agreed to discharge a portion of his claims against Tasso by payment of a yearly stipend.

At no time since Tasso left St. Anna had the heavens so smiled upon him. Capitolian honours and money were now at his disposal. Yet fortune arrived too late. Before he donned the crown of poet laureate and received his pensions, Tasso went to the hilltop convent of Sant'Onofrio on a stormy 1 April 1595. After his coach toiled up the steep Trasteverine Hill and the monks came to the door to greet it, Tasso stepped out and announced to the prior that he had come there to die.

Tasso died in Sant'Onofrio in April 1595, aged 51. The last twenty years of his existence had been practically and artistically unsatisfying.

== Other works ==
Rime (Rhymes), nearly two thousand lyrics in nine books, were written between 1567 and 1593, influenced by Petrarch's Canzoniere (Songbook).

Galealto re di Norvegia (1573–4) is an unfinished tragedy, which was later finished under a new title: Re Torrismondo (1587). It is influenced by the tragedies of Sophocles and Seneca, and tells the story of princess Alvida of Norway, who is forcibly married off to the Goth king Torrismondo, when she is devoted to her childhood friend, king Germondo of Sweden.

In Messaggiero (The Messenger) (1582), Tasso touches on the nature of the diplomat.

Dialoghi (Dialogues), written between 1578 and 1594. These 28 texts deal with issues from morality (love, virtue, nobility) to the mundane (masks, play, courtly style, beauty). Sometimes Tasso touches on major themes of his time, such as religion vs. intellectual freedom; Christianity vs. Islam at Lepanto.

Discorsi del poema eroico, published in 1594, is the main text for Tasso's poetics. It was probably written during the years he was working on Gerusalemme Liberata.

== Mental illness ==
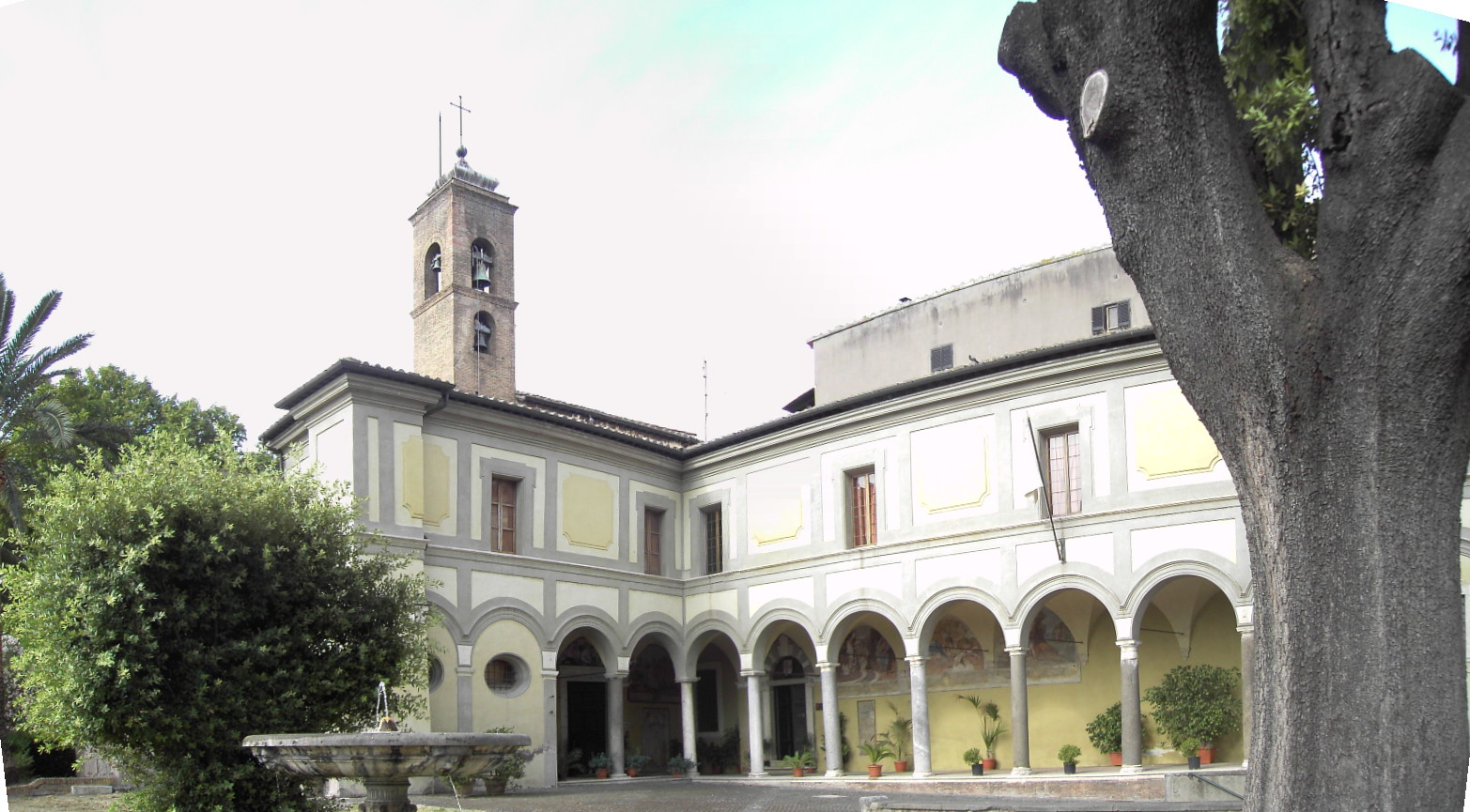
The Convent of Sant'Onofrio

The disease Tasso had is now believed to be bipolarity. Legends describe him wandering the streets of Rome half-mad, convinced that he was being persecuted. After his lengthy imprisonment in Ferrara's Santa Anna lunatic asylum, he was able to resume his writing, although he never fully recovered.

== Influence ==
- Tasso's lyric poetry may have had some influence in late Renaissance France on Desportes and Ronsard (whom Tasso met in Paris). It almost certainly influenced a number of Elizabethan Englishmen, including Sir Philip Sidney, Abraham Fraunce and Samuel Daniel.
- Claudio Monteverdi composed Il combattimento di Tancredi e Clorinda upon the text of Gerusalemme Liberata, canto XII. He also composed music over some of Tasso's Rime, particularly madrigals.
- Giaches de Wert and Carlo Gesualdo da Venosa put into music many texts from Tasso's Rime and Gerusalemme.
- The German writer Johann Wolfgang von Goethe wrote a play, Torquato Tasso, in 1790, which explores the struggles of the artist. He also composed a cantata text, "Rinaldo", inspired by canto XVI of Jerusalem Delivered, later set to music by Johannes Brahms.
- Giacomo Leopardi wrote Dialogo di Torquato Tasso e del suo Genio familiare (Operette morali, 1824), a prose about the long stay in St. Anna. The main theme is a comparison between pain and boredom, expressed in a dialogue between Tasso and a "Genius", or ghost, said to be visiting him in his loneliness.
- Among the numerous operas based on Jerusalem Delivered are works by Lully, Alessandro Scarlatti, Vivaldi, Handel, Haydn, Salieri, Cherubini, Christoph Willibald Gluck, Rossini and Dvořák. An experimental modern opera on the theme, by Judith Weir, transposes the scene into contemporary Iraq.
- Both Edmund Spenser and John Milton were greatly influenced by Tasso's work.
- Lord Byron's poem "The Lament of Tasso" narrates Tasso's spell in St. Anna's hospital.
- The Italian composer Gaetano Donizetti wrote an opera on the subject of Torquato Tasso (1833) and incorporated some of the poet's writing into the libretto.
- Felicia Hemans's poem Tasso's Coronation records the poet's death immediately prior to his intended crowning.
- Letitia Elizabeth Landon published her poem Tasso's last interview with the Princess Leonora as a Metrical Fragment in 1826.
- Franz Liszt composed a symphonic poem, Tasso, Lamento e Trionfo, in commemoration of the centenary of Goethe's birth.
- Artists inspired by both Jerusalem Delivered and Aminta have been legion and include Tintoretto, the Carracci, Guercino, Pietro da Cortona, Domenichino, Cigoli, Van Dyck, Poussin, Claude Lorrain, Tiepolo, Boucher, Fragonard, Johann Friedrich Overbeck, Hayez and Delacroix.

== Translations ==
During the Renaissance, the first (incomplete) translation of Jerusalem Delivered was brought out by Richard Carew (1594). A complete version by Edward Fairfax appeared under the title Godfrey of Bouillon in 1600. John Hoole's version in heroic couplets followed in 1772, and Jeremiah Holmes Wiffen's (in Spenserian stanzas) in 1821. There were several 20th- and 21st-century versions, including by Anthony Esolen (2000) and by Max Wickert, published as The Liberation of Jerusalem by Oxford University Press (2009). Aminta, also his early love poems, as Love Poems for Lucrezia Bendidio, ed. and trans. by Max Wickert. New York: Italica Press, 2011, and as Rhymes of Love, ed. M.H. and S. Acocella, trans. by Maria Pastore Passaro (Ottawa: Legas, 2011). Several of the "Dialogues", "Torrismondo," and some of the late religious works have also been issued in English.

Translation in most European languages: in German by Gries (1st edition 1800), Streckfuss (1822) and Duttenhofer (1840), in French by, among others, Baour-Lormian (best edition 1819) and Philippon de la Madeleine (1841), in English, among others, by Hunt (1819) and Wiffen (1825), in Swedish by Carl Anders Kullberg (1860), in Danish by Christine Daugaard (1884, abridged).

== Legacy ==
Tasso is commemorated by monuments in Bergamo and Sorrento. There are streets named after him in virtually every major Italian city, most notably in Bergamo, Posillipo (Naples), Rome, Turin, Palermo and Catania, as well as in Paris and Palo Alto, California.

== See also ==
- Orlando Furioso

== Sources ==
- Luigi Ugolini, The Poet of Sorrento: Torquato Tasso (Il Poeta di Sorrento), Società Editrice Internazionale, 1995.
- Peter Brand, Charles Peter Brand, Lino Pertile, The Cambridge History of Italian Literature, Cambridge University Press, 1999, ISBN 978-0-521-66622-0.
