= Eleonora d'Este (1537–1581) =

Ferrarese noblewoman

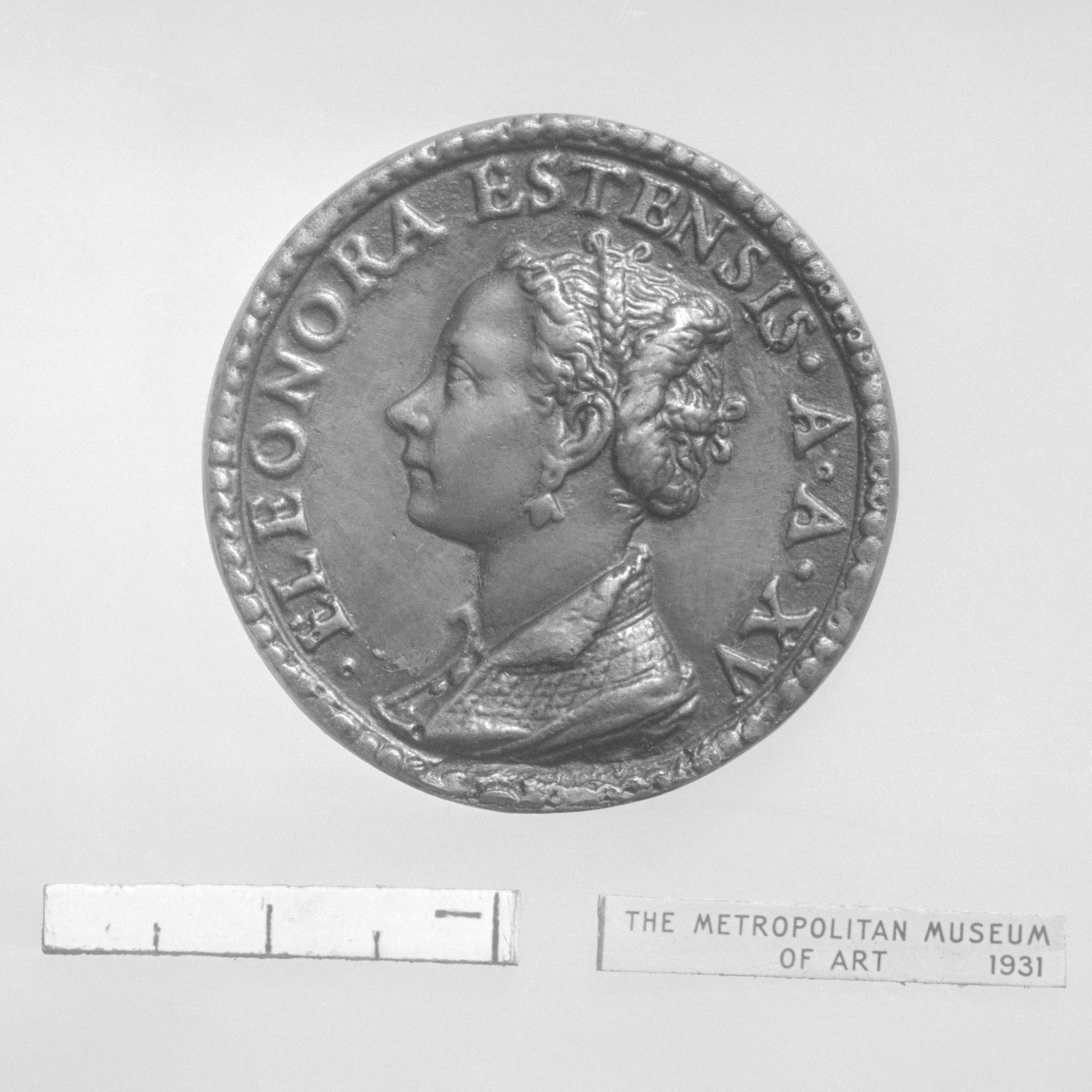

Eleonora d'Este (19 June 1537, – 19 February 1581) was a Ferrarese noblewoman. She was the fourth daughter of Ercole II d'Este, Duke of Ferrara and his wife Renée of France, the second daughter of Louis XII of France and Anne of Brittany. She and her elder sister Lucrezia d'Este were the dedicatees of Torquato Tasso's poem O figlie di Renata (O daughters of Renata).
