= Renée of France =

Duchess of Ferrara, Modena and Reggio (1510–1574)

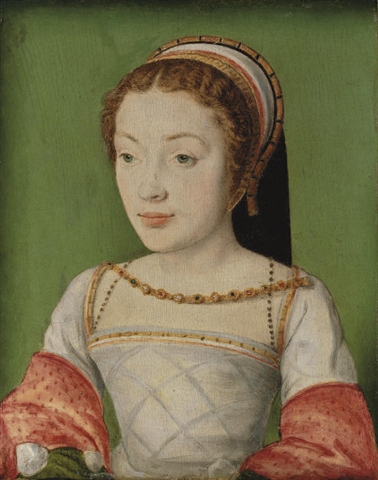
- Portrait by Corneille de Lyon, c. 1530

Countess/Duchess of Chartres (Note: Duchess of Chartes from 1528)
- Tenure: 25 October 1510 – 12 June 1574
- Predecessor: Charles II of Alençon
- Successor: Alfonso II d'Este

Duchess consort of Ferrara
- Tenure: 31 October 1534 – 3 October 1559

Duchess consort of Modena and Reggio
- Tenure: 31 October 1534 – 3 October 1559
- Born: 25 October 1510; Château de Blois, Kingdom of France
- Died: 12 June 1574/1575; Château de Montargis, Kingdom of France
- Burial: Château de Montargis
- Spouse: Ercole II d'Este (m. 1528; died 1559)
- Issue Detail: Anna d'Este; Alfonso II d'Este; Lucrezia Maria d'Este; Eleonora d'Este; Luigi d'Este
- House: Valois-Orléans
- Father: Louis XII of France
- Mother: Anne of Brittany

Renée of France (25 October 1510 – 12 June 1574/1575), was Duchess of Ferrara from 31 October 1534 until 3 October 1559 by marriage to Ercole II d'Este, a grandson of Pope Alexander VI. She was the younger daughter of Louis XII of France and Anne, Duchess of Brittany. In later life, she became an important supporter of the Protestant Reformation and ally of John Calvin.

== Early years ==
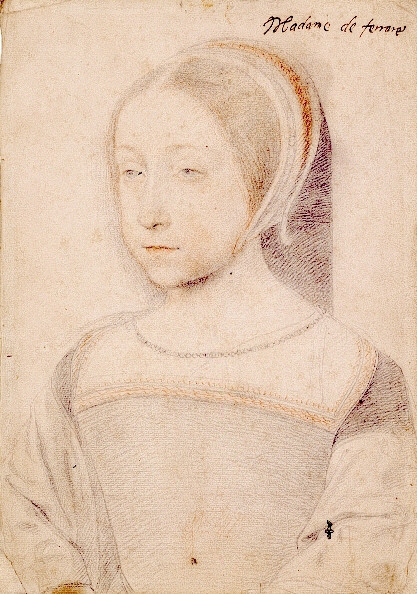
Renée in c. 1520 drawn by Jean Clouet, Condé Museum

Renée was born on 25 October 1510 at the Château de Blois, Blois, Touraine and was the second daughter of Louis XII of France and Anne of Brittany. Anne, who had always fought fiercely to keep Brittany independent of the French crown, tried to will the duchy to Renée, but Louis prevented this, passing the duchy to her elder sister, Claude.

Renée's early education was undertaken by her governess, Michelle de Saubonne, Madame de Soubise. Saubonne was a partisan of Anne of Brittany and opposed to Anne's enemy, Louise of Savoy, so after the death of Renée's parents, Louise and her son, Francis I of France, had Saubonne sacked. Renée never forgot this, and when she married, she took Saubonne with her.

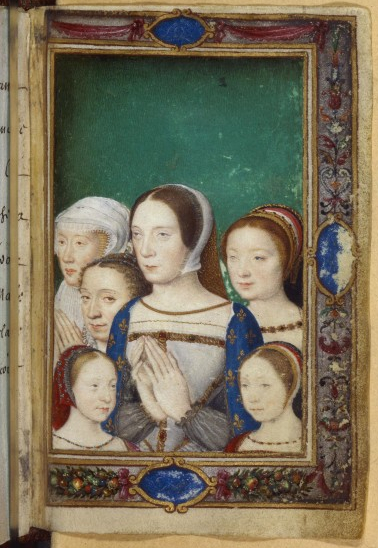
Renée (far right) with her sister and nieces

In 1515, the Treaty of Paris (1515) was signed. This treaty promised that Renée, then four years old, would marry Charles V in exchange for the Duchy of Berry and a dowry of 200,000 silver crowns. The terms of this treaty would fail to be upheld by either side, and the marriage would never take place.

In return for renouncing her claims to the Duchy of Brittany, Renée was granted the Duchy of Chartres by Francis. She was considered as a possible bride for King Henry VIII.

== Duchess of Ferrara ==
Renée was married in April 1528 to Ercole II d'Este, Duke of Ferrara, eldest son of Alfonso I d'Este and Lucrezia Borgia. By this marriage, she became known as Renata di Francia. Renée received from Francis I an ample dowry and annuity. Thus the court that she assembled about her in Ferrara, in the 1530s and 1540s, corresponded to the tradition which the cultivation of science and art implicitly required, including scholars like Bernardo Tasso and Fulvio Pellegrino Morato. Poets Clément Marot and Vittoria Colonna, and reformers Bernardino Ochino and John Calvin, were also present at her court.

On 31 October 1534, her father-in-law died and Ercole succeeded to the throne. Hardly had he rendered his oath of allegiance to Pope Paul III when he turned against the French at his own court, many of whom had been brought by Renée. Both their number and influence displeased him; and, besides, he found them too expensive; so he by direct or indirect means secured their dismissal, including the poet Clément Marot. And while the Curia was urging the duke to put away the French that were suspected of heresy against Catholicism, there came to Ferrara the Protestant theologian John Calvin, whose journey to Italy must have fallen in March and April 1536. Calvin passed several weeks at the court of Renée in the summer of 1536. As a result of Renée's patronage, Calvin's opus magnum circulated at the court: the Institutes of the Christian Religion, in two Latin editions (1536, 1539). This was at a time when the persecution of Protestants had already begun in the area. Among those arrested and tried by the Inquisition were Jehannet, a chorister, Cornillan, an attendant of the duchess, and Bouchefort, a priest from Tournay. The Inquisition also arrested a "man of small stature" who escaped, but this was the poet Marot, not Calvin.

=== Heresy trial ===
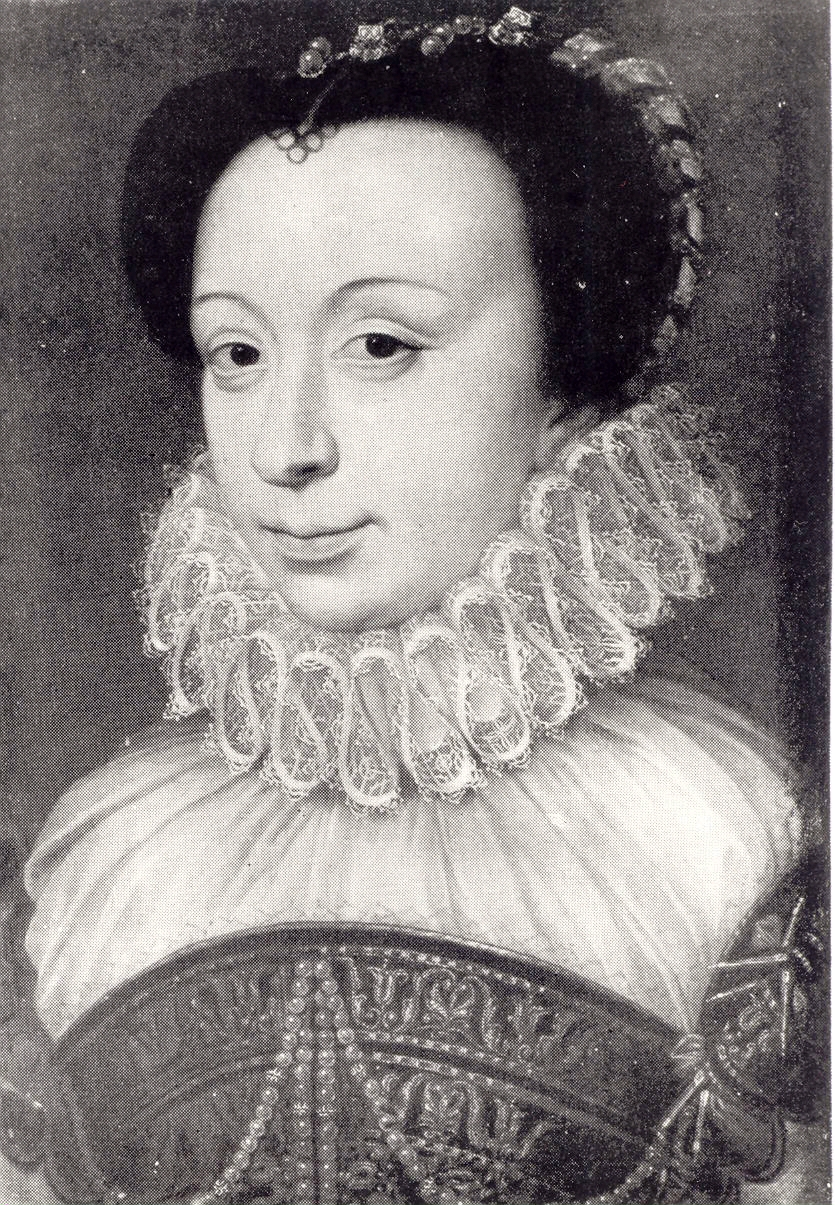
Renée de France by François Clouet

Renée was in correspondence with a very large number of Protestants abroad, and with intellectual sympathizers like Vergerio, Camillo Renato, Giulio di Milano, and Francis Dryander. On two or three occasions, about 1550 or later, she partook of the Eucharist in the Protestant manner together with her daughters and fellow believers. Meanwhile, notwithstanding its external splendor, her life had grown sad. The last of her French guests, the daughter and son-in-law of Madame de Soubise of Pons, were sent away in 1543 by the duke. The Counter-Reformation, which had been operative in Rome since 1542, led to the introduction of a special court of the Inquisition at Ferrara, in 1545. In 1550 and 1551, this court imposed death sentences on Protestant sympathizers (Fanino Fanini of Faenza and Giorgio of Sicily), who were executed by the secular arm.

Finally, Duke Ercole lodged an accusation against Renée before her nephew King Henry II of France. Through the Inquisitor Ortiz, whom the king charged with this errand, Renée was arrested as a heretic, and declared forfeit of all possessions unless she recanted. She resisted steadfastly for some time, until her two daughters were taken away from her, supposedly forever. As a condition for being reunited with her children, she yielded and made confession on 23 September 1554. Subsequently, however, she refused to attend mass, which for her was a form of blasphemy.

=== Return to France ===
Renée's longing to return home was not satisfied until a year after the death of her husband on 3 October 1559. In France she found her eldest daughter's husband François, Duke of Guise, at the head of the Catholic party. His power was broken by the death of his nephew Francis II in December 1560, so that Renée was able to provide Protestant worship at her estate Montargis, engaging a capable preacher by application to Calvin. She acted as a benefactress for the surrounding Protestants, making her castle a refuge for them when the first phase French Wars of Religion began in 1562.

Again, her conduct won Calvin's praise (10 May 1563), and she is one of the frequently recurring figures in his correspondence of that period. He repeatedly shows recognition of her intervention in behalf of the Evangelical cause; and one of his last writings in the French tongue, dispatched from his deathbed (4 April 1564), is addressed to her.

While Renée continued unmolested in the second phase of the wars (1567), in the third phase (1568–70) her castle was no longer respected as an asylum for Protestants. On the other hand, she succeeded in rescuing a number of them from the St. Bartholomew's Day massacre, when she happened to be in Paris. The Catholic forces left her personally undisturbed at that time, though Catherine de' Medici still sought to move her to retract, a demand which she ignored.

Renée was widowed in 1559. As a result of being on bad terms with her son, Alfonso, she returned to France in 1560 and settled in Montargis, where she then died on 12 June 1574/1575.

== Issue ==
Renée and Ercole had:

- Anna d'Este, 16 November 1531 – 1607, married firstly, Francis, Duke of Guise until 1563, married secondly Jacques de Savoie, 2nd Duc de Nemours
- Alfonso II d'Este, Duke of Ferrara, 22 November 1533 – 1597
- Lucrezia Maria d'Este, 16 December 1535 – 1598, married Francesco Maria II della Rovere, Duke of Urbino.
- Eleonore d'Este, 1537–1581
- Luigi d'Este, 21 December 1538 – 1586, Bishop of Ferrara and Archbishop of Auch

== Sources ==
- Braikenridge, Isabella M. (1859). Some Memorials of Renée of France, Duchess of Ferrara. London: Bosworth and Harrison. OCLC 1080178743.
- Parker, Holt (2007). "Morata, Fulvia Olympia, (1526/1527–1555)". In Robin, Diana Maury; Larsen, Anne R.; Levin, Carole (eds.). Encyclopedia of women in the Renaissance: Italy, France, and England. ABC-CLIO, Inc.
- Knecht, R.J. (1996). Renaissance Warrior and Patron: The Reign of Francis I. Cambridge: Cambridge University Press. ISBN 978-0521578851.
- Matarasso, Pauline Maud (2001). Queen's Mate: Three Women of Power in France on the Eve of the Renaissance. Ashgate.
- Peebles, Kelly Digby; Scarlatta, Gabriella, eds. (2021). Representing the Life and Legacy of Renée de France: From Fille de France to Dowager Duchess. Palgrave Macmillan.
- Previté-Orton, C. W. (1978). Cambridge Medieval History, Shorter: Volume 2, The Twelfth Century to the Renaissance. Cambridge University Press.
- Robin, Diana (2007). "Renata di Francia (Renée de France, 1510–1574)". In Robin, Diana Maury; Larsen, Anne R.; Levin, Carole (eds.). Encyclopedia of Women in the Renaissance: Italy, France, and England. ABC-CLIO. ISBN 978-1851097722.
- Warnicke, R.M. (1989). The Rise and Fall of Anne Boleyn: Family politics at the court of Henry VIII. Cambridge University Press. ISBN 978-0-521-37000-4.
- Wieck, Roger S. (2021). "The Primer of Renee of France". In Peebles, Kelly Digby; Scarlatta, Gabriella (eds.). Representing the Life and Legacy of Renée de France: From Fille de France to Dowager Duchess. Palgrave Macmillan.
- Philippe Le Bas (1844). Frères, Firmin Didot (ed.). France: Dictionnaire Encyclopédique (in French). Vol. 11. Paris: Longmans, Green. pp. 399–400.

Renée of France House of Valois-Orléans Cadet branch of the House of Valois Born: 25 October 1510 Died: 12 June 1574
Royal titles
Preceded by Crown lands of France after Charles II of Alençon	Countess and duchess of Chartres; 25 October 1510 – 12 June 1574	Succeeded by Alfonso II d'Este
Preceded by Lucrezia Borgia	Duchess consort of Ferrara, Modena and Reggio; 31 October 1534 – 3 October 1559	Succeeded by Lucrezia de' Medici
