= Ercole II d'Este =

Duke of Ferrara, Modena, and Reggio from 1534 to 1559

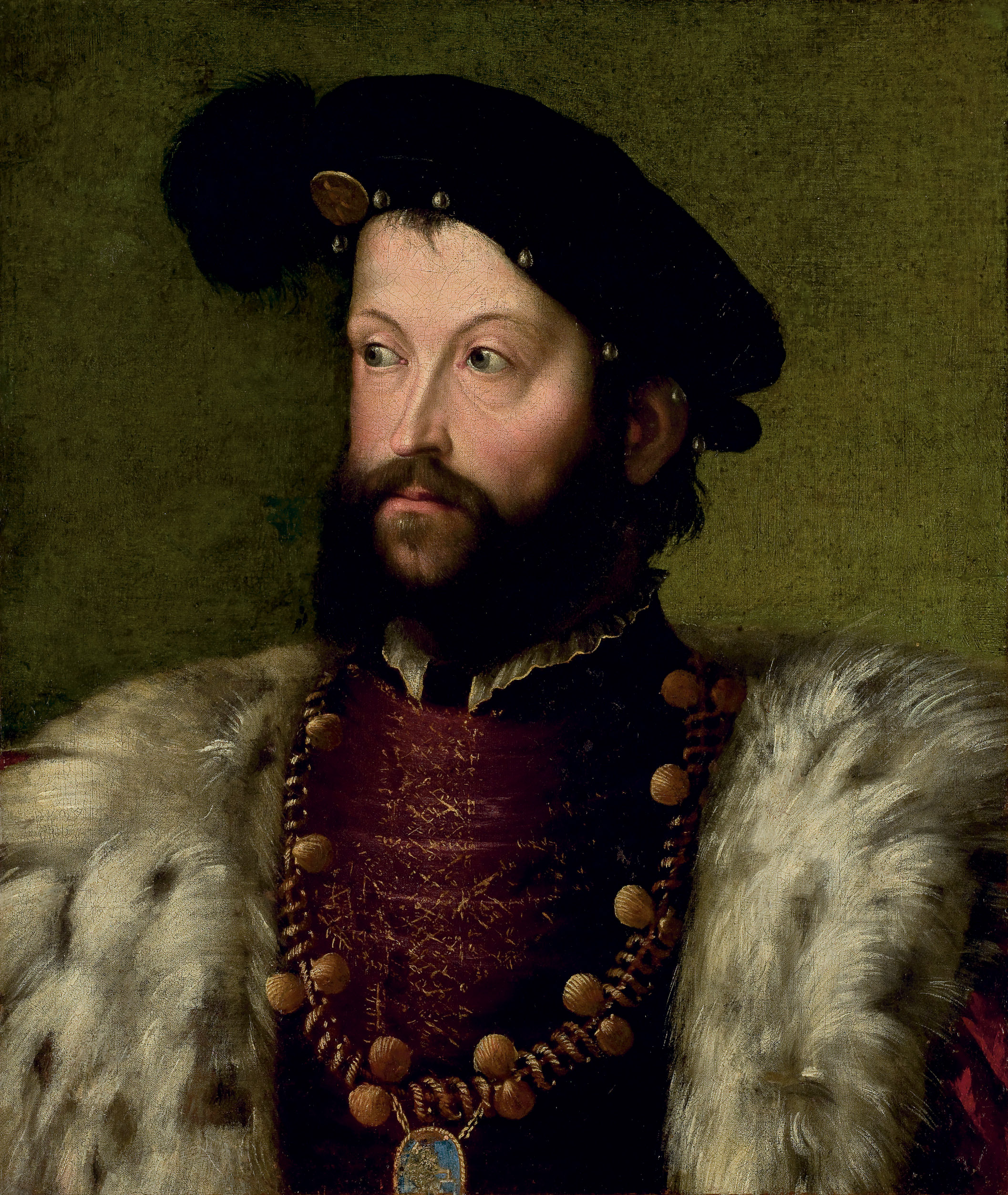
- Portrait by Niccolò dell'Abbate

Duke of Ferrara, Modena and Reggio
- Reign: 31 October 1534 – 3 October 1559
- Predecessor: Alfonso I d'Este
- Successor: Alfonso II d'Este
- Born: 4 April 1508; Ferrara, Duchy of Ferrara
- Died: 3 October 1559 (aged 51); Ferrara, Duchy of Ferrara
- Spouse: Renée of France (m. 1528)
- Issue: Anna, Duchess of Guise; Alfonso II, Duke of Ferrara; Lucrezia d'Este; Eleonora d'Este; Luigi d'Este
- House: Este
- Father: Alfonso I d'Este
- Mother: Lucrezia Borgia

Ercole II d'Este (4 April 1508 – 3 October 1559) was Duke of Ferrara, Modena and Reggio from 1534 to 1559. He was the eldest son of Alfonso I d'Este and Lucrezia Borgia.

== Biography ==
Ercole was the son of Alfonso I d'Este and Lucrezia Borgia. Through his mother, Ercole was a grandson of Pope Alexander VI, nephew of Cesare Borgia, and cousin of Saint Francis Borgia. Through his father, he was nephew of Cardinal Ippolito d'Este.

Ercole played an indirect role in the 1527 Sack of Rome. Emperor Charles V's army crossed the Alps in 1526 but was unable to bring their heavy artillery with them. They sought to make a deal with Ercole, who subsequently provided the army with the necessary artillery to later advance on and sack the city of Rome.

In April 1528, he married Renée of France, the second daughter of Louis XII, King of France, and Anne of Brittany. Renée received from Francis I of France an ample dowry and annuity. Thus the court she assembled about her in Ferrara corresponded to the tradition which the cultivation of science and art implicitly required, including scholars like Bernardo Tasso and Fulvio Pellegrini Morato. Their first child, Anna, born in 1531, who was married to Francis, Duke of Guise, was followed by Alfonso in 1533; Lucrezia in 1535, who was married to the Duke of Urbino Francesco Maria II della Rovere; and later Eleonora and Luigi.

Once he became a Duke in October 1534, Ercole turned against the French at his court, finding them both too expensive and too influential, and by 1543 they had all been dismissed. He was also under pressure from the Curia to dismiss those suspected of heresy; John Calvin himself was in Ferrara sometime in 1536. Meanwhile, Duchess Renée was corresponding with a number of Protestants and was suspected to have converted, despite the presence of a special court of the Inquisition in Ferrara. Ercole brought accusations of heresy against his wife to King Henry II of France and Inquisitor Oriz in 1554, and she subsequently confessed.

Ercole sided with Pope Paul IV and France against Spain in 1556, but made a separate peace agreement in 1558. He was also a patron of the arts along with his brother, Cardinal Ippolito, who built the Villa d'Este near Tivoli.

== Sources ==
- Bartlett, Kenneth R. (2013). A Short History of the Italian Renaissance. University of Toronto Press. ISBN 978-1-4426-0014-0.

Ercole II d'Este House of Este Born: 4 April 1508 Died: 3 October 1559
Regnal titles
| Preceded by Alfonso I | Duke of Ferrara, Modena and Reggio; 1534–1559 | Succeeded by Alfonso II |
