= Bernardo Tasso =

Italian courtier and poet (1493–1569)

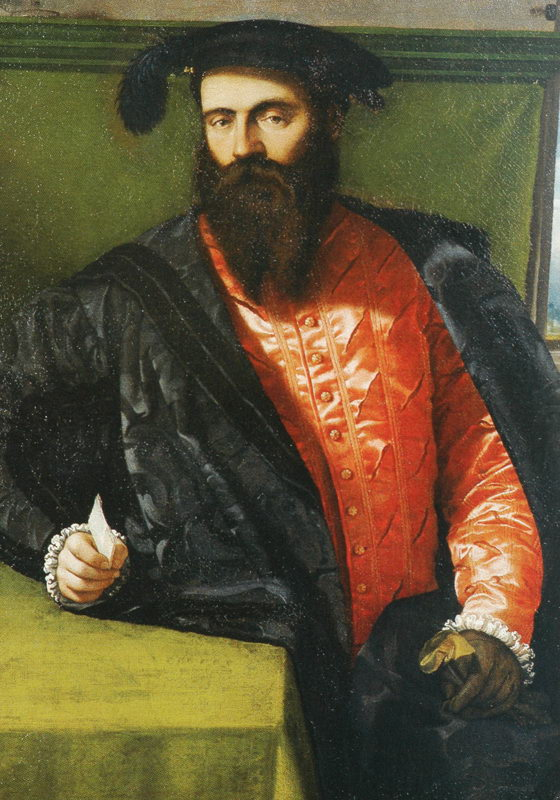
Bernardo Tasso

Bernardo Tasso (11 November 1493 – 5 September 1569), born in the Republic of Venice, was an Italian courtier and poet.

== Biography ==
He was, for many years, secretary in the service of the prince of Salerno, and his wife Porzia de Rossi was closely connected with the most illustrious Neapolitan families. Their son, the great poet Torquato Tasso, was born at Sorrento in 1544. During the boy's childhood the prince of Salerno came into collision with the Spanish government of Naples, was outlawed, and was deprived of his hereditary fiefs. Tasso shared in this disaster of his patron. He and his son were proclaimed rebels to the state.

Bernardo's sister, Bordelisia Tasso al secolo (circa 1500 -1567), was placed by her uncle in the Benedictine monastery of San Grata in Bergamo.

Bernardo moved to Rome where his son joined him in about 1552. In 1556 news came that Porzia had died, and Bernardo suspected her brother of poisoning her with the object of getting control over her property. As it subsequently happened, Porzia's estate never descended to her son; and the daughter Cornelia married below her birth, at the instigation of her maternal relatives.

He served various noblemen then, among them duke Guidobaldo II, in whose court his son Torquato was educated. When Bernardo was serving the duke of Mantua, Guglielmo Gonzaga, he was appointed governor of Ostiglia.

When, therefore, an opening at the court of Urbino was offered in 1557, Bernardo Tasso gladly accepted it. He read cantos of his Amadigi to the duchess and her ladies, or discussed the merits of Homer and Virgil, Trissino and Ariosto, with the duke's librarians and secretaries. He also traveled to Venice to superintend the printing of the Amadigi.

Bernardo Tasso died in Ostiglia, then part of the Duchy of Mantua.

== Work ==
An author of diverse works, Tasso wrote psalms, eclogues, sonnets and odes. The latter were the first Italian poems written in the manner of Horace. His lyric poems were published with the title Amori in Venice (1555). His main work, L'Amadigi, is an epic poem divided in 100 cantos and inspired by the Spanish chivalric romance Amadis de Gaula (known in fragmentary form since the 14th century; first printed in its entirety in 1508). The Amadigi was left incomplete but was later completed by his son Torquato, who published the full text under the title Floridante in 1587.
