= Ferrante d'Este =

Ferrarese nobleman

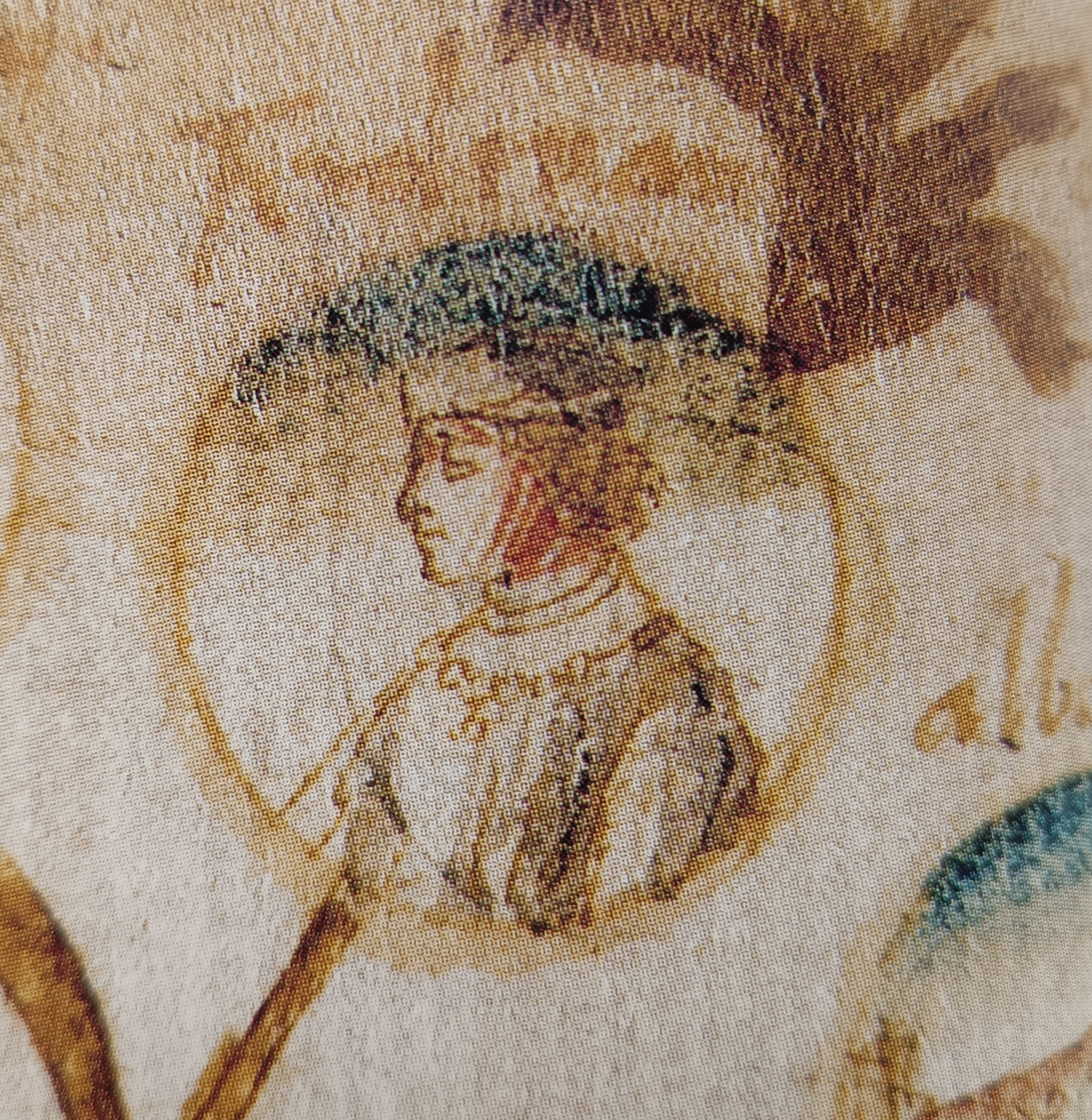
Miniature by Ferrante d'Este from the Historia Ferrariae by Pellegrino Prisciani, book VII (in ASMo, library manuscripts, 131, c. 2v). It would seem from this that his hair tended to blond, as it did for his brother Sigismund and many of his paternal uncles.

Ferrante d'Este (19 September 1477, Castel Capuano, Naples – February 1540, Ferrara) was a Ferrarese nobleman and condottiero. He was the son of Ercole I d'Este and Eleonora d'Aragona - he was named after his mother's father Ferdinand I of Naples. His five siblings were Alfonso I d'Este, cardinal Ippolito d'Este, Isabella d'Este, wife of Francesco II Gonzaga, Beatrice d'Este, and Sigismondo d'Este. His two illegitimate half-siblings were Giulio and Lucrezia d'Este.

== Life ==
=== At Charles VIII's court ===
He was born in Naples, where his mother had gone into seclusion. He was christened on 7 October 1477 with Giuliano della Rovere as his godfather and raised at the Aragonese court in Naples. In 1493 his father invited him to join the court of Charles VIII of France. When Charles invaded Italy, Ferrante decided not to follow the French army to Naples but remained in Rome, spending his regular allowance from his father dissolutely. Ercole accidentally allowed a letter to get through to the French army. The letter was reproaching Ferrante for his behaviour and ordering him not to lose Charles' favour. Ferrante obeyed and fought at Charles' side at the battle of Fornovo before returning to Italy in 1497.

All the sources of the time agree in describing him as a beautiful young man of good intelligence, and he was even compared to Saint George.

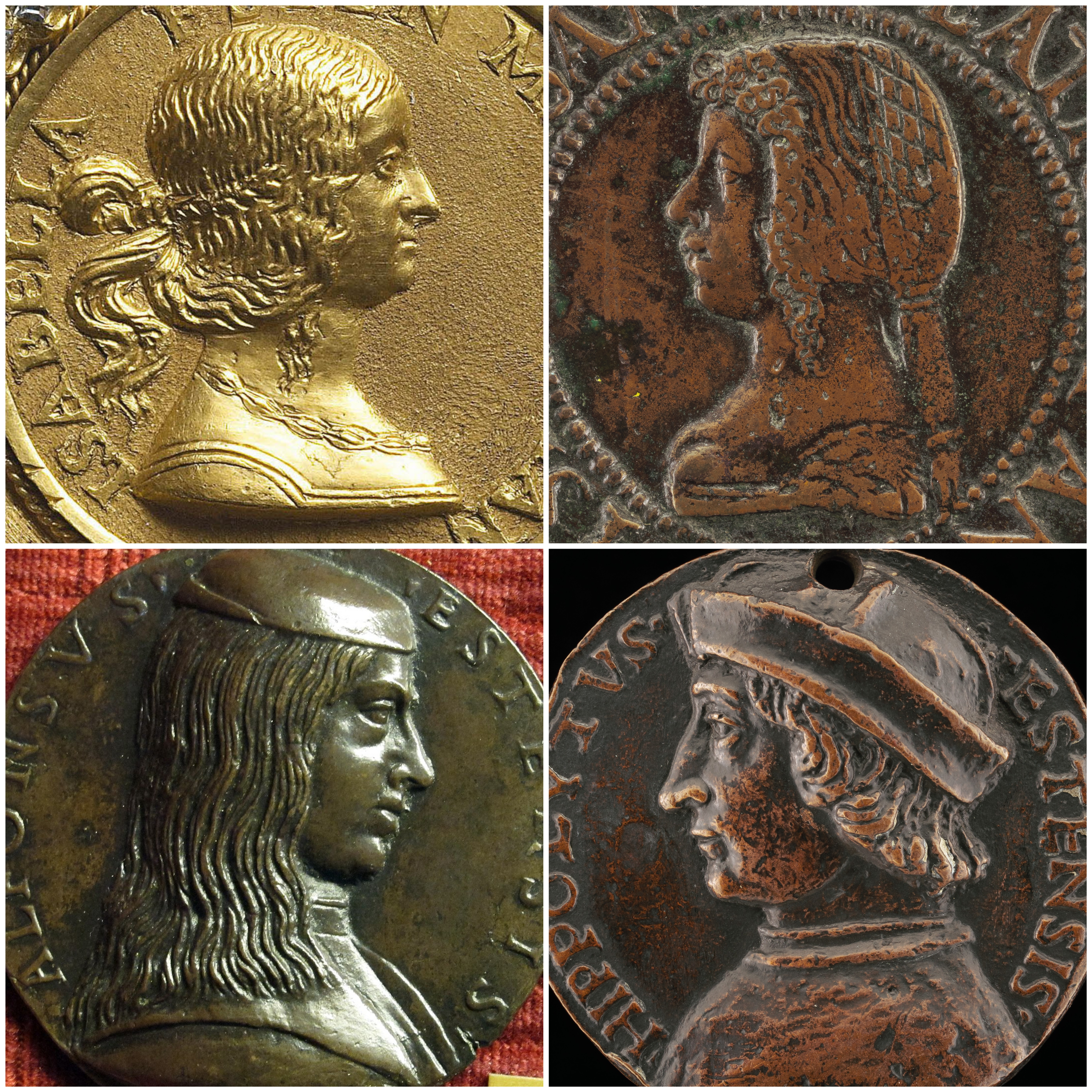
The Este siblings' medals: Isabella, Beatrice, Alfonso, and Ippolito.

=== Return to Ferrara ===
In 1498 he gained a condotta from the Venetian Republic for the war in Pisa. Ferrante, Marco da Martinengo, Gurlino Tombesi and Filippo Albanese defended Pisa against the Florentine army. At the war's end in spring 1499 he returned to Ferrara and was dismissed by Venice. In 1499 he and his brother Alfonso went to Milan to meet Charles VIII's successor Louis XII of France after his conquest of Lombardy. With his huge debts to the French court, Ferrante was unable to gain Louis' favour. In 1502 the duke of Ferrara ordered him to take possession of Cento and Pieve, which Pope Alexander VI had transferred to the house of Este.

The Este brothers argued over a musician named don Rainaldo. He was in the service of Giulio d'Este, Ercole I's illegitimate son, but cardinal Ippolito d'Este wanted him for his own chapel. At the end of 1504 Ippolito came to Ferrara during his father's illness and carried off Rainaldo, locking him in the Rocca del Gesso, a fortress belonging to Giovanni Boiardo, count of Scandiano. In May 1505 Giulio discovered where Rainaldo was and sent Ferrante with armed men to snatch him back. Ippolito and Alfonso complained at this to the duke and got Ferrante exiled to Modena and Giulio to Brescello. Lucrezia, Isabella d'Este and her husband Francesco II Gonzaga all managed to convince Alfonso to pardon his brothers.

=== Conspiracy ===
In 1506 Ferrante, his half-brother Giulio and other nobles opposed to Ippolito and Alfonso conspired to assassinate him and put Ferrante in his place. However, its planning was poor and their assassins failed to kill Alfonso at night with their poisoned daggers as they had hoped. Ippolito's spies brought the plan to light and told Alfonso. He set up an inquest and Giulio, Ferrante and three other men were found guilty and condemned to death. Giulio fled to Mantua but Francesco Gonzaga handed him over to Alfonso. Ferrante was led to the ducal castello a couple of months before the trial. Giulio and Ferrante were both pardoned but stripped of their lands (which were given to Alfonso's favourites) and imprisoned in the torre dei Leoni. Ferrante spent the rest of his life in prison, dying aged 63, after 34 years' imprisonment and with no visits from any family members. Giulio was released by Alfonso II d'Este aged 80, after 53 years' imprisonment.

== Bibliography ==
- Sarah Bradford, Lucrezia Borgia, Milano, Mondadori, 2005. ISBN 88-04-55627-7
- Sergio Mantovani, "Ad honore del signore vostro patre et satisfactione nostra". Ferrante d'Este condottiero di Venezia, Ferrara-Modena, 2005.
- Litta Biumi, Pompeo. Famiglie celebri italiane (in Italian). Milano: Luciano Basadonna Editore.
