= Sigismondo d'Este (1480–1524) =

Italian noble

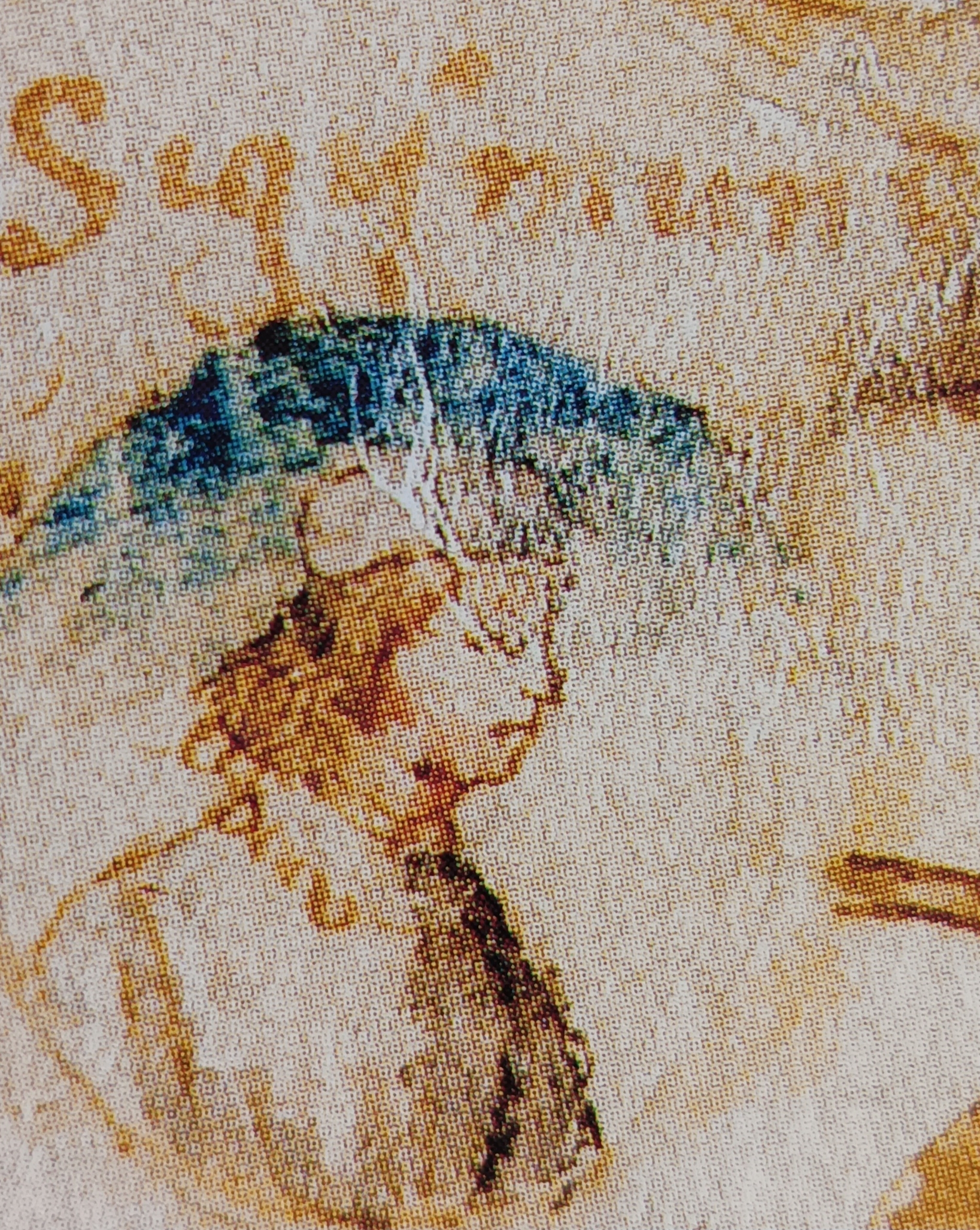
Miniature by Sigismondo d'Este from the Historia Ferrariae by Pellegrino Prisciani, book VII (in ASMo, library manuscripts, 131, c. 2v).

Sigismondo d' Este (September 1480 – August 9, 1524) was the youngest son of Ercole I d'Este, Duke of Ferrara, and Eleanor of Aragon, daughter of Ferdinand I of Naples.

He grew up at the court of Ferrara. After his father's death, the title passed to his brother Alfonso I d'Este.

He was the head of the procession Ferrara who went to Rome to take the future Duchess of Ferrara, Lucrezia Borgia, wife of Alfonso I.

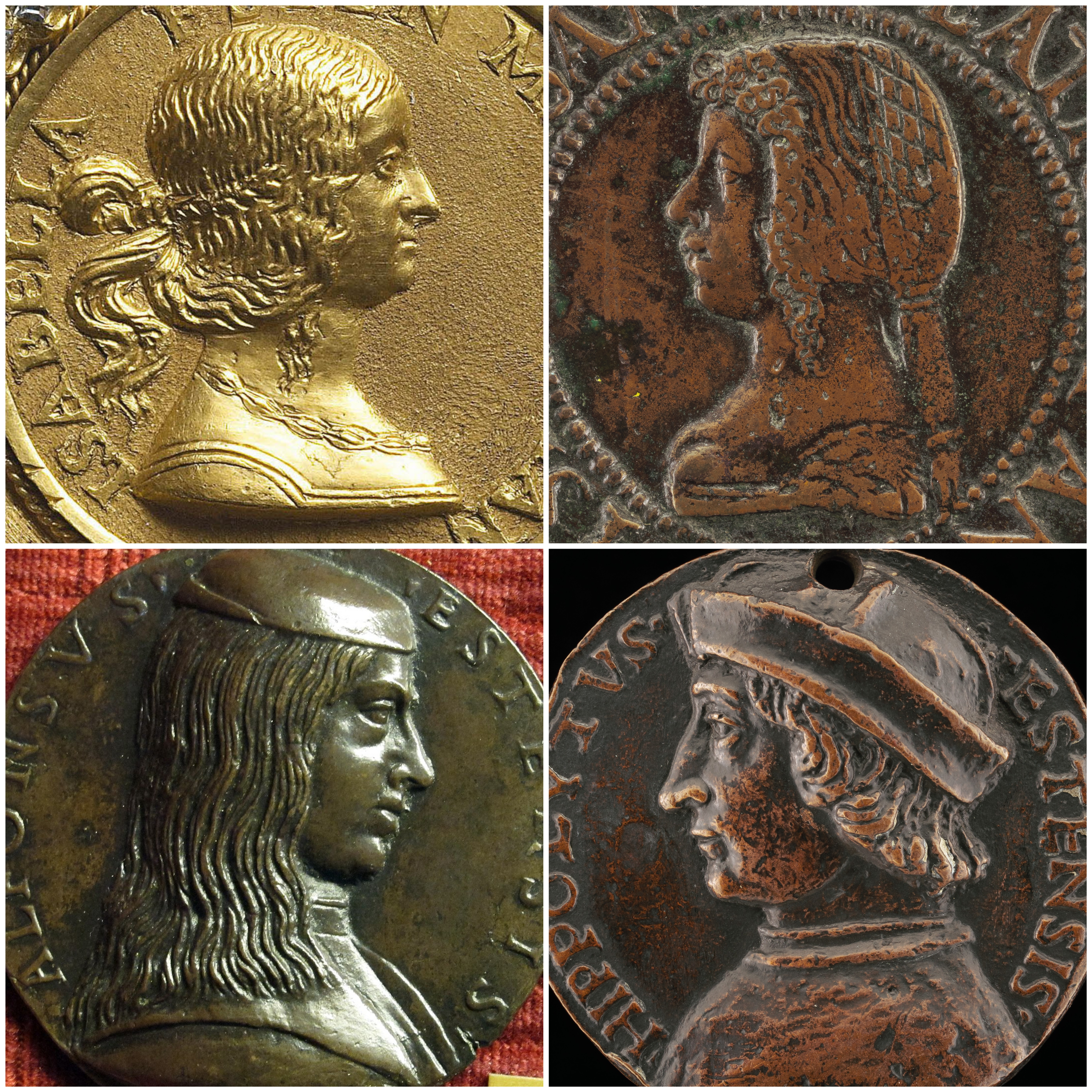
The Este siblings' medals: Isabella, Beatrice, Alfonso, and Ippolito.

In contrast to Ferrante d'Este and Giulio d'Este, Sigismund never attempted to oppose the brothers Alfonso and Ippolito d'Este, but rather lived in their shadow. Sigismund often accompanied the Duke on his travels in and out of the duchy.

When the conspiracy organized by Ferrante and Giulio was discovered, the trial against the two and other conspirators took place in the palace of Sigismund.

Alfonso and Ferrante contracted syphilis between 1496 and 1497, but while the brothers were able to recover Sigismund was unable to lead a normal life.
