= Sigismondo d'Este =

Sigismondo d'Este may refer to:

- Sigismondo d'Este (1433-1507), second son of Niccolò III d'Este and his third wife Ricciarda di Saluzzo
- Sigismondo d'Este (1480-1524), youngest son of Ercole I d'Este, Duke of Ferrara, and Eleanor of Aragon
