= Giulio d'Este =

Illegitimate son of Ercole I d'Este, Duke of Ferrara (1478-1561)

Giulio d'Este (13 July 1478 – 24 March 1561) was the illegitimate son of Ercole I d'Este, Duke of Ferrara. He is known for the conflicts he had with his half brother, Ippolito d'Este, which culminated in a failed conspiracy.

== Biography ==
=== In the court of Ferrara ===
Giulio's mother was Isabella Arduin, a lady in the service of Ercole's wife. Giulio had six half siblings, whom Ercole fathered with his wife Eleonora d'Aragon: Alfonso I d'Este (successor to his father), Ippolito d'Este (Cardinal Ippolito), Ferrante d'Este, Isabella d'Este (wife of Francesco II Gonzaga), Beatrice d'Este (wife of Ludovico Sforza), and Sigismondo d'Este. Giulio d'Este and Ippolito d'Este held grudges and differences with each other over the course of their lives.

Giulio grew up in the court of Ferrara and later resided in his palace on the Via degli Angeli (road of angels) in Ferrara.

=== The first quarrel ===
A dispute arose between Giulio and Ippolito concerning a musician, Don Rainaldo of Sassuolo, in the service of Giulio. Ippolito wanted him for his chapel and, near the end of 1504, coming to Ferrara during the illness of their father, abducted Rainaldo and held him in the Fortress of Gesso (which belonged to Giovanni Boiardo, count of Scadiano). In May 1505 Giulio discovered where Rainaldo was held and, together with Ferrante and other armed men, recovered him, and, in a sign of defiance towards, replaced him in his cell with the warden of the fortress. Ippolito, then a political advisor of Alfonso, protested so strongly that the duke exiled Ferrante to Modena and Giulio to Brescello.

Lucrezia Borgia (wife of Alfonso) and Isabella d'Este with her husband Francesco succeeded in convincing Alfonso to pardon them.

=== The second quarrel ===
Subsequently, Giulio and Ippolito discovered that they were both admirers of a lady of the court, and cousin of Lucrezia, Angela Borgia, who seemed to favor Giulio (i. The Cardinal Ippolito, a libertine and ladies' man, prided himself that his refinement could) conquer beautiful women, and was resentful. When Angela told him that, "Monsignore, your brother's [Giulio's] eyes are worth more than the whole of your person...", he flew into an uncontrollable rage. On 3 November 1505, while Giulio was returning from a trip to Belriguardo, he was surrounded by servants of Ippolito, who had ordered them to kill his half brother and tear out his eyes. Giulio was alone and, although he survived, was so brutally beaten he was scarred and his eyes were stabbed. He eventually lost his eyesight in one eye and was left with only blurred vision in the other. Ippolito had hastened to send to the Italian courts his version of the event, which ensured he avoided punishment.

In December of that same year, Alfonso secured a formal truce between the brothers.

=== Conspiracy against Ippolito and Alfonso and its aftermath ===
Despite the truce, Giulio held a grudge against both Ippolito, for the beating which had damaged his eyesight and his famous good looks, and Alfonso, for not punishing Ippolito. In 1506, along with Ferrante, who aspired to replace his brother, and other men hostile toward the duke, he organized a plot aimed at eliminating Alfonso and Ippolito. However, the plan failed due to disorganization: waiting at night in the street with poisoned daggers for the duke, they missed him twice.

During one of the frequent absences of the Duke, the spies of Ippolito gathered evidence about the plot, but before they reached Alfonso, both Lucrezia and Isabella advised Giulio to flee to Mantua where he would be protected by Francesco Gonzaga. There, Francesco, despite the demands of his brother-in-law, refused many times to hand over Giulio.

Meanwhile, the trial of the conspirators began in Giulio's absence at the home of Sigismondo d'Este. Giulio and Ferrante, together with three others, were found guilty and condemned to death.

Eventually Francesco succumbed to the pressure of Alfonso, who threatened to recover Giulio with his army, and turned Giulio over.

While the other conspirators were executed, the sentences of Giulio and Ferrante were reduced: they were imprisoned in the Leoni Tower with Castello Estense, and their property was confiscated.

Ferrante died in prison in 1540 at the age of 63 after 34 years of incarceration. Giulio, however, after 53 years in prison, was freed by his grandnephew Alfonso II d'Este at the age of 81. He supposedly caused a commotion among bystanders when he returned to the street because he retained his charm and an erect posture, and dressed in the fashion of 50 years before.

== Bibliography ==
- Bradford, Sarah (2004): Lucrezia Borgia: Life, Love and Death in Renaissance Italy. Viking.
- Maria Bellonci, Lucrezia Borgia, Mondadori Editore, Milan, 1998, ISBN 88-04-51658-5 (in Italian)
- Sarah Bradford, Lucrezia Borgia, Mondadori Editore, Milan, 2005, ISBN 88-04-55627-7 (in Italian)
