= Ercole I d'Este =

Duke of Ferrara from 1471 to 1505

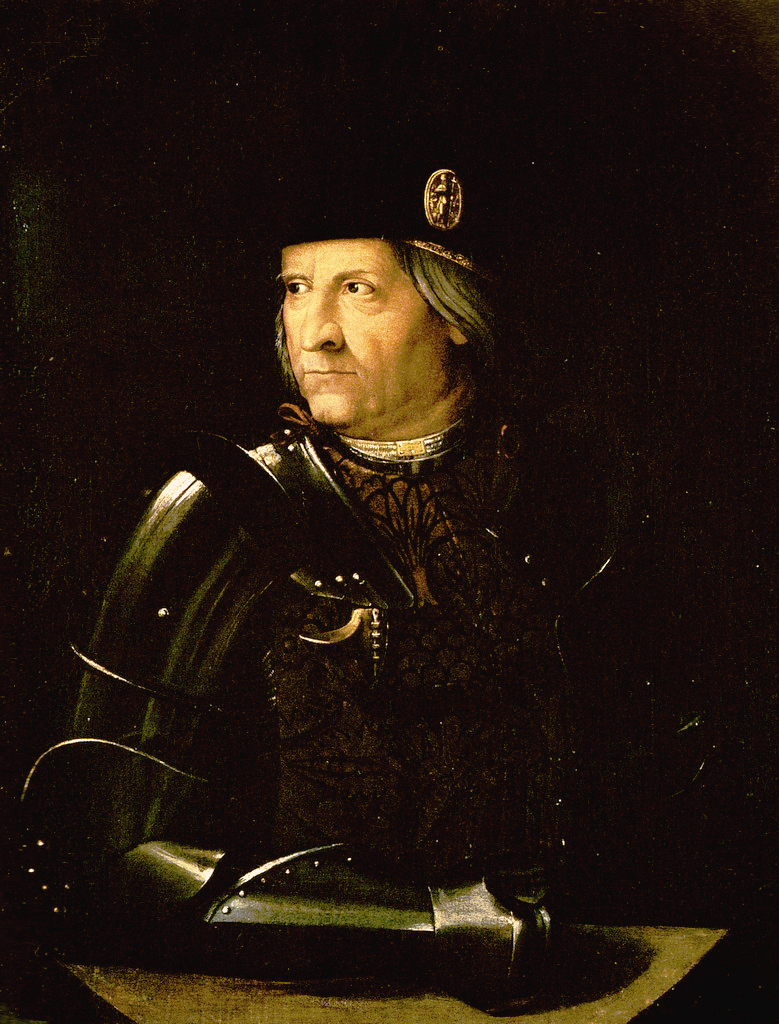
- Ercole I d'Este, possibly by Dosso Dossi (Galleria Estense, Modena), c. 1500–05

Duke of Ferrara, Duke of Modena and Reggio
- Reign: 20 August 1471 – 25 January 1505
- Predecessor: Borso d'Este
- Successor: Alfonso I d'Este
- Born: 26 October 1431; Ferrara, Duchy of Ferrara
- Died: 25 January 1505 (aged 73); Ferrara, Duchy of Ferrara
- Spouse: Eleonora d'Aragon
- Issue: Isabella; Beatrice; Alfonso; Ferrante; Ippolito; Sigismondo; Lucrezia (illeg.); Giulio (illeg.)
- House: Este
- Father: Nicolò III d'Este
- Mother: Ricciarda of Saluzzo

Ercole I d'Este (English: Hercules I; 26 October 1431 – 25 January 1505) was Duke of Ferrara, Modena, and Reggio from 1471 until his death in 1505. A member of the House of Este, he was known for his patronage of the arts and for strengthening the duchy's economy and political position.

== Biography ==
Ercole was born in 1431 in Ferrara to Niccolò III d'Este and Ricciarda of Saluzzo. His maternal grandparents were Thomas III of Saluzzo and Marguerite of Roussy.

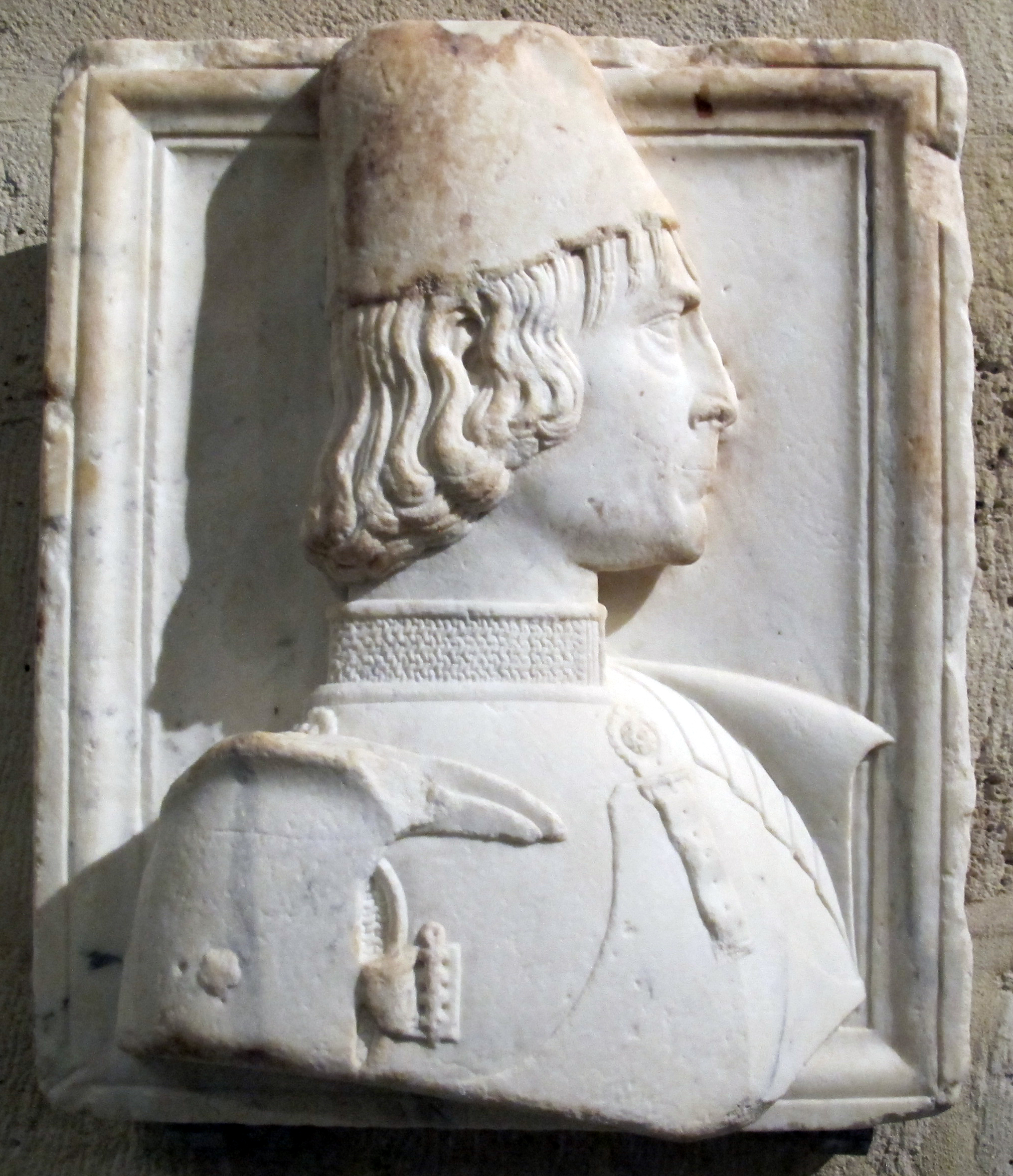
Portrait relief of Duke Ercole in armor by Sperandio Savelli, c. 1475

He was educated at the Neapolitan court of Alfonso, king of Aragon and Naples, from 1445 to 1460; there he studied military arts, chivalry, and acquired an appreciation for all'antica architecture and the fine arts, which would result in his becoming one of the most significant art patrons of the Renaissance.

In 1471, with the support of the Republic of Venice, he became Duke on the death of his half-brother Borso, profiting from the absence of the latter's son, Niccolò, who was in Mantua. During an absence of Ercole from Ferrara, Niccolò attempted a coup, which was however crushed; Niccolò and his cousin Azzo were beheaded on 4 September 1476. Ercole married Eleonora d'Aragon, daughter of Ferdinand I of Naples, in 1473. The Este alliance with Naples was to prove a powerful one.

In 1482–1484 he fought the War of Ferrara with the Republic of Venice, which was allied with Ercole's nemesis, the Della Rovere Pope Sixtus IV, occasioned by disputes over control of the salt monopoly. Ercole was able to end the war by ceding the Polesine at the Peace of Bagnolo, and Ferrara escaped the fate of destruction or absorption into the papal dominions, but the war was a humiliation for Ercole, who lay sick and immobilized while the besieging army destroyed Este properties in the surrounding neighbourhoods.

After this, he remained neutral in the Italian War of 1494–1495, and tried for the rest of his rule to improve relations with the Papal states. He reluctantly agreed to the marriage of his son Alfonso to Lucrezia Borgia, daughter of Pope Alexander VI, a marriage that brought notable territorial donations.

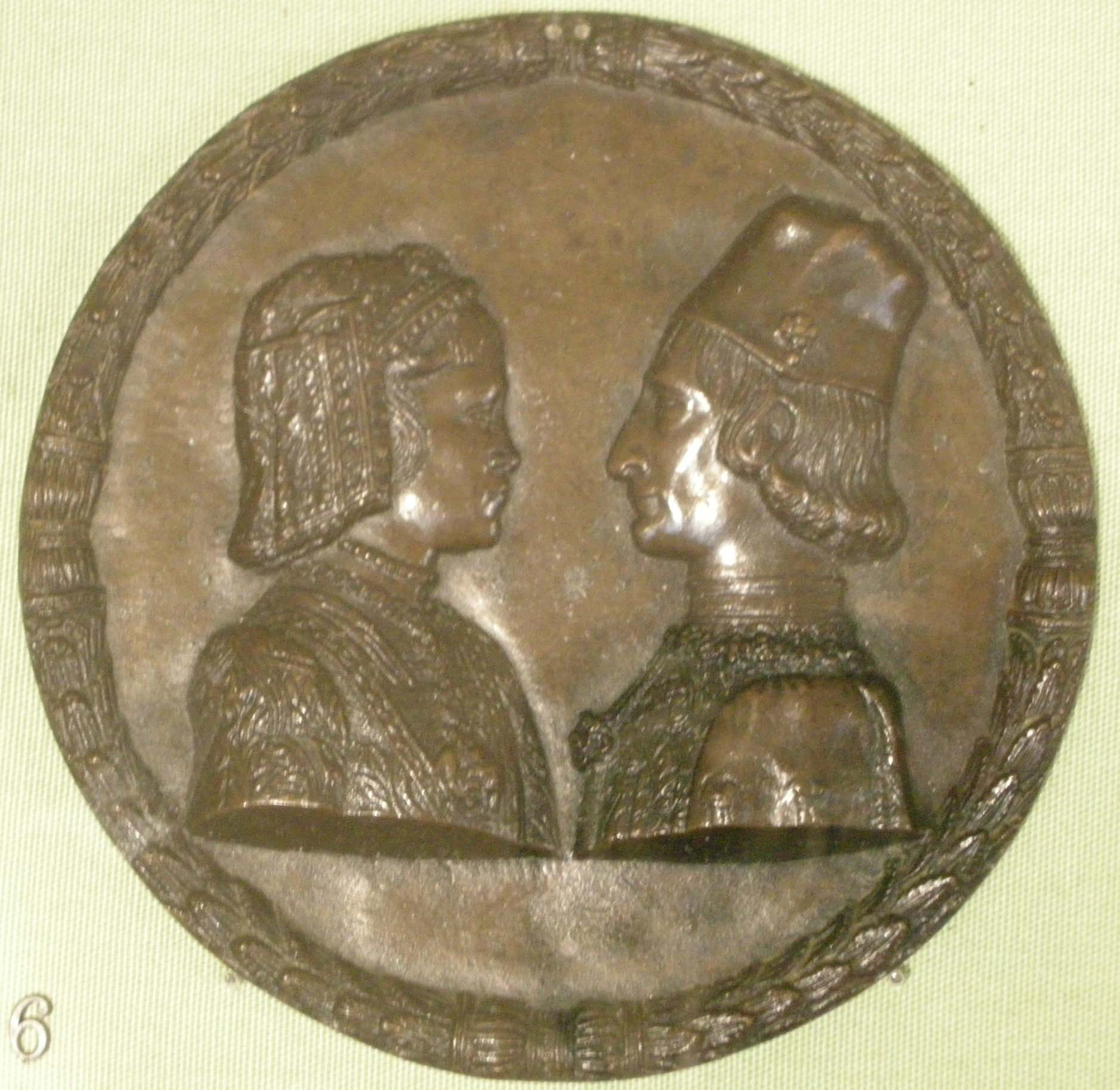
Eleonora d'Aragona and Ercole I d'Este.

His subsequent career as a patron may be seen to some extent as compensation for the early military setback: significantly, Ercole was the only Italian ruler who characterized himself as divus on his coinage, like a Roman emperor.

The scale and consistency of Ercole's patronage of the arts was in part a political and cultural statement. He hosted theatrical representations with elaborate scenery and musical intermezzi, some of the first purely secular theatre in Europe since antiquity and was successful in setting up a musical establishment which was for a few years the finest in Europe, overshadowing the Vatican chapel itself. For the next century Ferrara was to retain the character of a center of avant-garde music with a decidedly secular emphasis. In music history Ercole was one of the Italian nobles most responsible for bringing talented Franco-Flemish musicians to Italy. The most famous composers of Europe either worked for him, were commissioned by him, or dedicated music to him, including Alexander Agricola, Jacob Obrecht, Heinrich Isaac, Adrian Willaert, and Josquin des Prez, whose Missa Hercules dux Ferrariae not only is dedicated to him, but is based on a theme drawn from the syllables of the Duke's name.

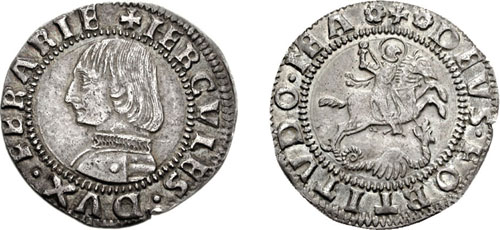
Grosh issued under Ercole I d'Este.

Ercole is equally famous as a patron of the arts. He made the poet Boiardo his minister, and also brought the young Ludovico Ariosto into his household.

Under Ercole Ferrara became one of the leading cities of Europe; it underwent substantial growth in the Ercolean Addition, approximately doubling in size, under Ercole's direct guidance, producing the first planned and executed urbanistic project of the Renaissance. To enclose it, he extended the city's walls, hiring architect Biagio Rossetti for the work. Many of Ferrara's most famous buildings date from his reign.

Ercole was an admirer of church reformer Girolamo Savonarola, who was also from Ferrara, and sought his advice on both spiritual and political matters. Approximately a dozen letters between the two survive from the 1490s. Ercole attempted to have Savonarola freed by the Florentine church authorities, but was unsuccessful; the reformist monk was burned at the stake in 1498.

In 1503 or 1504, Ercole asked his newly hired composer Josquin des Prez to write a musical testament for him, structured on Savonarola's prison meditation Infelix ego. The result was the Miserere, probably first performed for Holy Week in 1504, with the tenor part possibly sung by the Duke himself.

Ercole died on 25 January 1505, and his son Alfonso became Duke.

== Appearance and personality ==
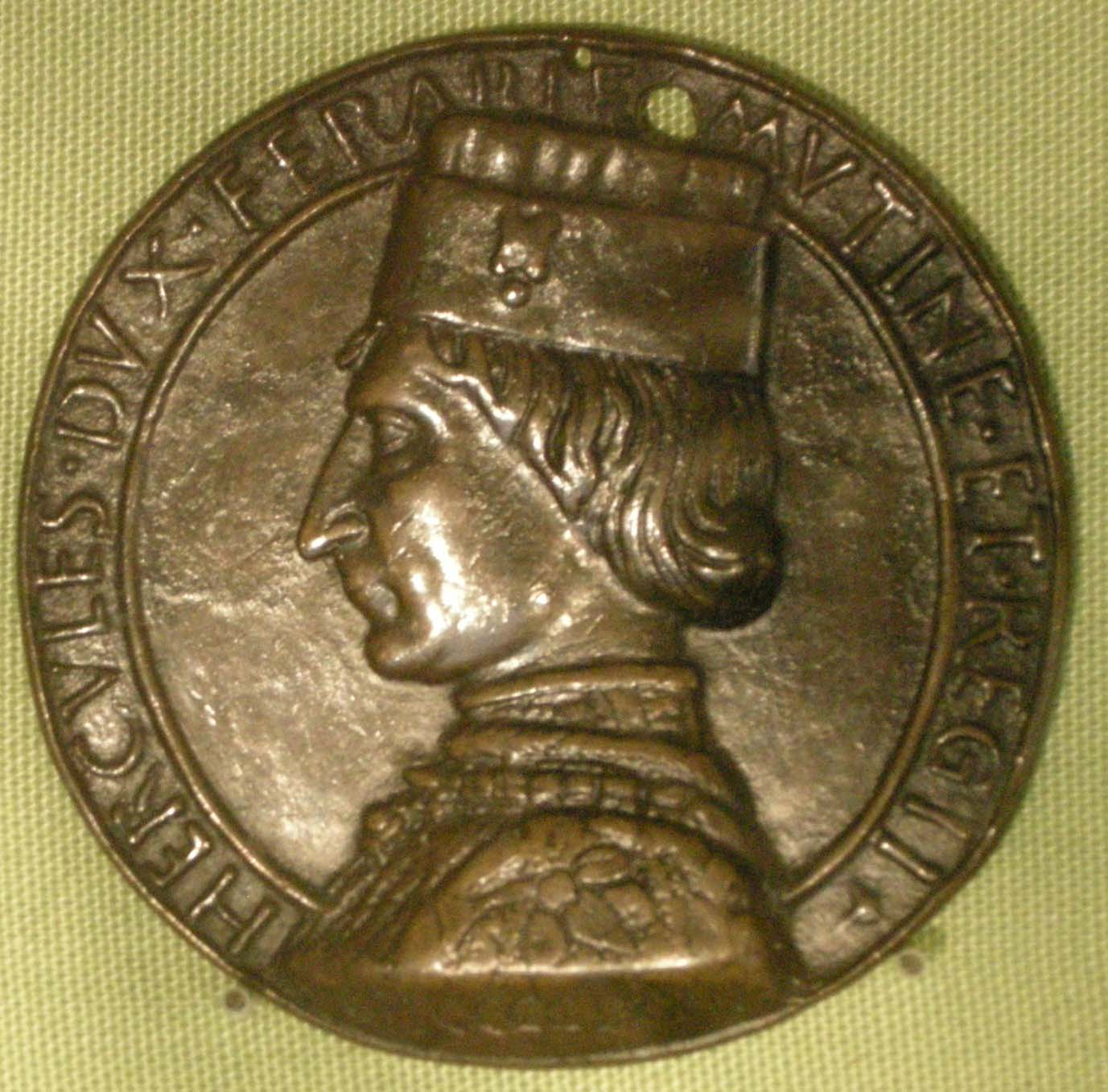
Ludovico Coradino, medal of Duke Ercole, 1473.

Ercole was a duke sincerely loved by his subjects, who repeatedly demonstrated it to him, both taking his defense against Niccolò di Leonello and at the time of the war with Venice, when they spontaneously took up arms to press the invader, sometimes against the will of Hercules himself.

He was magnanimous, beneficial, famous for his clemency: he offered forgiveness even to the same supporters of Niccolò, as long as they swore obedience to him, and very often pardoned those condemned to death (even in cases of lesa maiestatis) when they were already with the rope around their necks ready for hanging.

He loved to dance very much, which he continued to do despite an injury to his foot, in addition to the already mentioned passions for music and singing, which he then transmitted to his children. Several times he found himself dying over the years, now because of the wound never completely healed, now for illness and now for suspected poisoning, and always recovered, sometimes treating himself in country residences or at the spa.

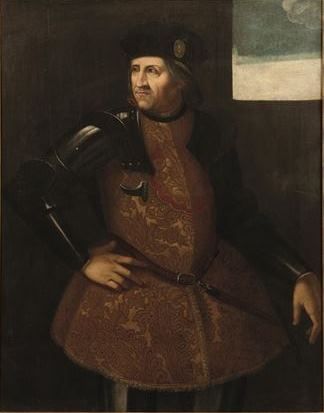
Portrait of Duke Ercole, Dosso Dossi.

In his youth he possessed a very impetuous character, which he manifested especially in war, in rides and duels, which he then transmitted to most of his children. Even at a more mature age he continued to always be at the forefront of the battles in which he took part, exposing himself to danger of life and sometimes receiving some wounds.

He loved jokes and buffoons. In an episode during the Carnival of 1478, he went out disguised into the streets of Ferrara in the company of his guest, the lord of Bologna Giovanni Bentivoglio. The brothers Sigismondo and Rinaldo and other courtiers would throw eggs at the ladies and ended up in a brawl in the town square.

Nevertheless, Hercules was called "cold much more than the tramontana" and from this derived his other nickname. He was a devout man, he listened to Mass every day or even several times a day and on Holy Thursday he fed hundreds of poor people every year, serving his own meal in the great hall of the castle together with his brothers, and then washing the feet of the guests and giving them clothes and money. Together with his religious wife he was protector of nuns and founder of convents.

As for his physical appearance, Aliprando Caprioli describes him as "of the right and square stature; et very strong in person. He had a colorful face, clear blue eyes, and black hair". However, although blue eyes were frequent within the d'Este family, at least from the portraits that have remained of him it would seem to have possessed dark eyes.

== Family and issue ==
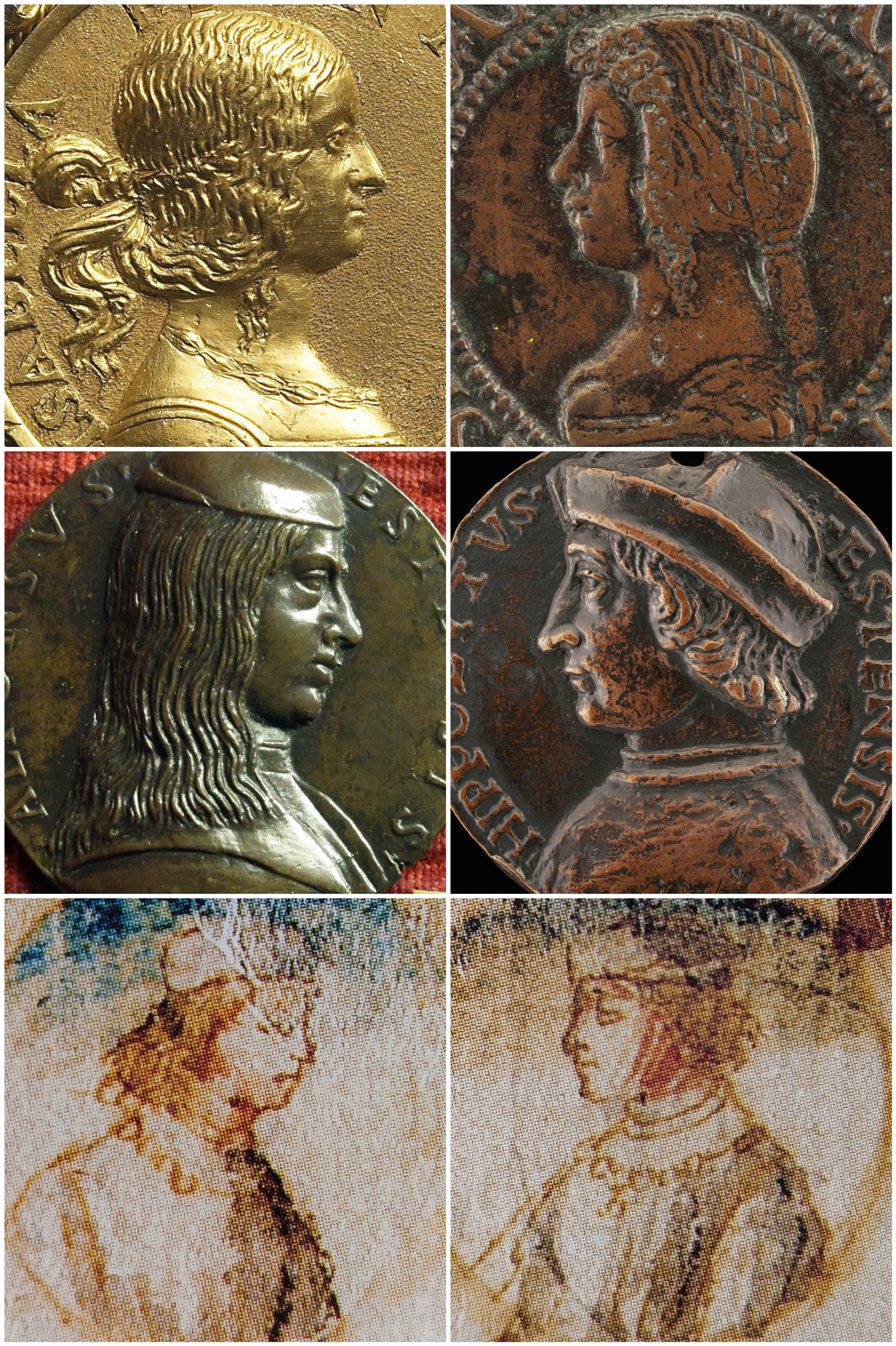
Children of Ercole I d'Este. Most inherited his nose and dark hair; Ferrante and Sigismondo were blond, like earlier Este ancestors.

Ercole and Eleonora had:

- Isabella d'Este (1474–1539), married Francesco II Gonzaga, Marquess of Mantua
- Beatrice d'Este (1475–1497), married Ludovico Sforza, future Duke of Milan
- Alfonso I d'Este (1476–1534), married Anna Maria Sforza and Lucrezia Borgia
- Ferrante d'Este (1477–1540), imprisoned by his brother Alfonso in 1506 and died 34 years later.
- Ippolito d'Este (1479–1520), cardinal
- Sigismondo d'Este (1480–1524)
- Alberto d'Este (1481–1482), died in infancy.

Ercole also had three illegitimate children:

- Lorenzo d'Este (d. 1471), his eldest son, of uncertain maternal origin.
- Lucrezia d'Este (c. 1470 – 1516/18), married Annibale II Bentivoglio.
- Giulio d'Este (1478–1561).

== See also ==
- Duke of Ferrara and of Modena

== Sources ==
- Bartlett, Kenneth R. (2013). A Short History of the Italian Renaissance. University of Toronto Press. ISBN 978-1442600140.
- Bertazzo, Claudia (2009). "Il principe umanista". Medioevo (in Italian). 11 (142 (Oct.)): 78.
- Bietenholz, Peter G.; Deutscher, Thomas B., eds. (1995). Contemporaries of Erasmus. Vol. I: A-E. University of Toronto Press. ISBN 0-8020-2507-2.
- D'Elia, Anthony F. (2004). The Renaissance of Marriage in Fifteenth-Century Italy. Harvard University Press. ISBN 978-0674015524.
- Guerra, Enrica (2005). Soggetti a ribalda fortuna gli uomini dello stato estense nelle guerre dell'Italia quattrocentesca (in Italian). F. Angeli.
- Lockwood, Lewis (1984). Music in Renaissance Ferrara, 1400-1505: The Creation of a Musical Center in the Italian Renaissance. Oxford University Press.
- Macey, Patrick (1998). Bonfire Songs: Savonarola's Musical Legacy. Oxford: Clarendon Press. ISBN 0-19-816669-9.
- Manca, Joseph (1989). "The Presentation of a Renaissance Lord: Portraiture of Ercole I d'Este, Duke of Ferrara (1471-1505)". Zeitschrift für Kunstgeschichte. 52 (4): 522–538. doi:10.2307/1482468. JSTOR 1482468.
- Sanudo, Marino (2008). White, Laura Sanguineti; Labalme, Patricia H. (eds.). Venice, Cità Excelentissima: Selections from the Renaissance Diaries of Marin Sanudo. Translated by Carroll, Linda L. Johns Hopkins University Press. ISBN 9780801887659.
- Zorzi, L. (1977). Il teatro e la città: saggi sulla scena italiana (in Italian). Einaudi.

| Preceded by Borso | Duke of Ferrara, Modena and Reggio; 1471–1505 | Succeeded by Alfonso I |
