= Alfonso I d'Este =

Duke of Ferrara from 1504 to 1534

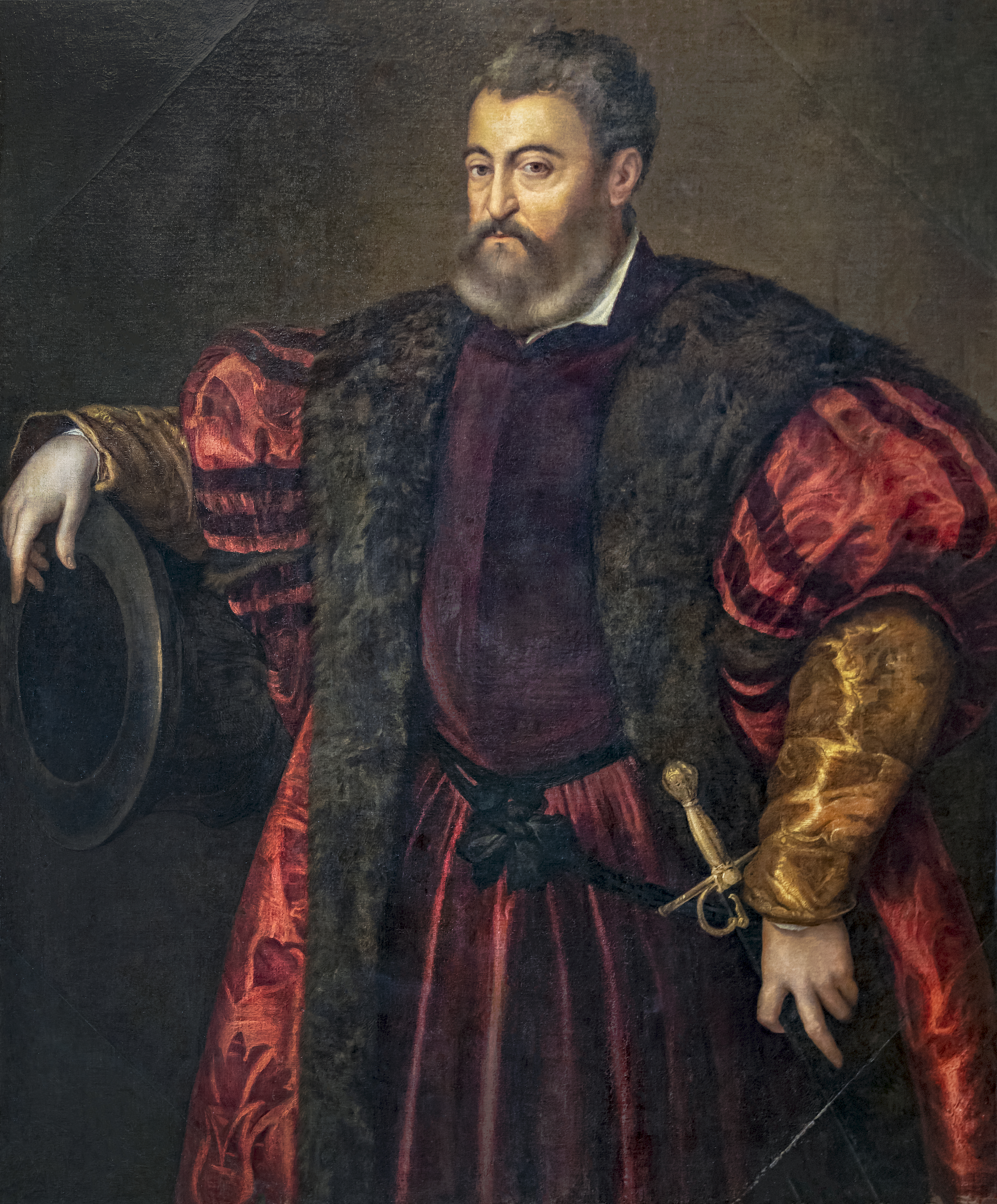
- Alfonso by Titian; Alfonso leans on a cannon, holding his sword

Duke of Ferrara, Duke of Modena and Reggio
- Reign: 25 January 1505 – 31 October 1534
- Predecessor: Ercole I d’Este
- Successor: Ercole II d'Este
- Born: 21 July 1476; Ferrara, Duchy of Ferrara
- Died: 31 October 1534 (aged 58); Ferrara, Duchy of Ferrara
- Spouse: Anna Sforza (m. 1491; died 1497); Lucrezia Borgia (m. 1501; died 1519); Laura Dianti (m. 1534) (Note: The marriage between Alfonso I and Laura Dianti probably took place shortly before the Duke's death in 1534. The historian Muratori tried to prove that the marriage had taken place, collecting a considerable amount of documentation, but there does not seem to be any official document of a marriage that actually took place. Even in the absence of absolute documentary proof, "there can be no doubts about the public, official nature of the union".)
- Issue Detail: Ercole II d'Este, Duke of Ferrara; Ippolito II d'Este; Leonora d'Este; Francesco d'Este, Marchese di Massalombarda; Alfonso d'Este, Lord of Montecchio (illegitimate, father of Cesare d'Este)
- House: Este
- Father: Ercole I d'Este
- Mother: Eleanor of Naples

Alfonso I d'Este (21 July 1476 – 31 October 1534) was Duke of Ferrara, Modena, and Reggio from 1505 until his death in 1534. A prominent military leader during the Italian Wars, he served on various sides throughout the conflict.

Alfonso was considered one of the most capable Italian generals of his age, who also owned the most advanced factory of firearms of the peninsula. Renowned for his innovations in the use of artillery, he earned the nickname Duca Artigliere ("Artilleryman Duke").

== Biography ==
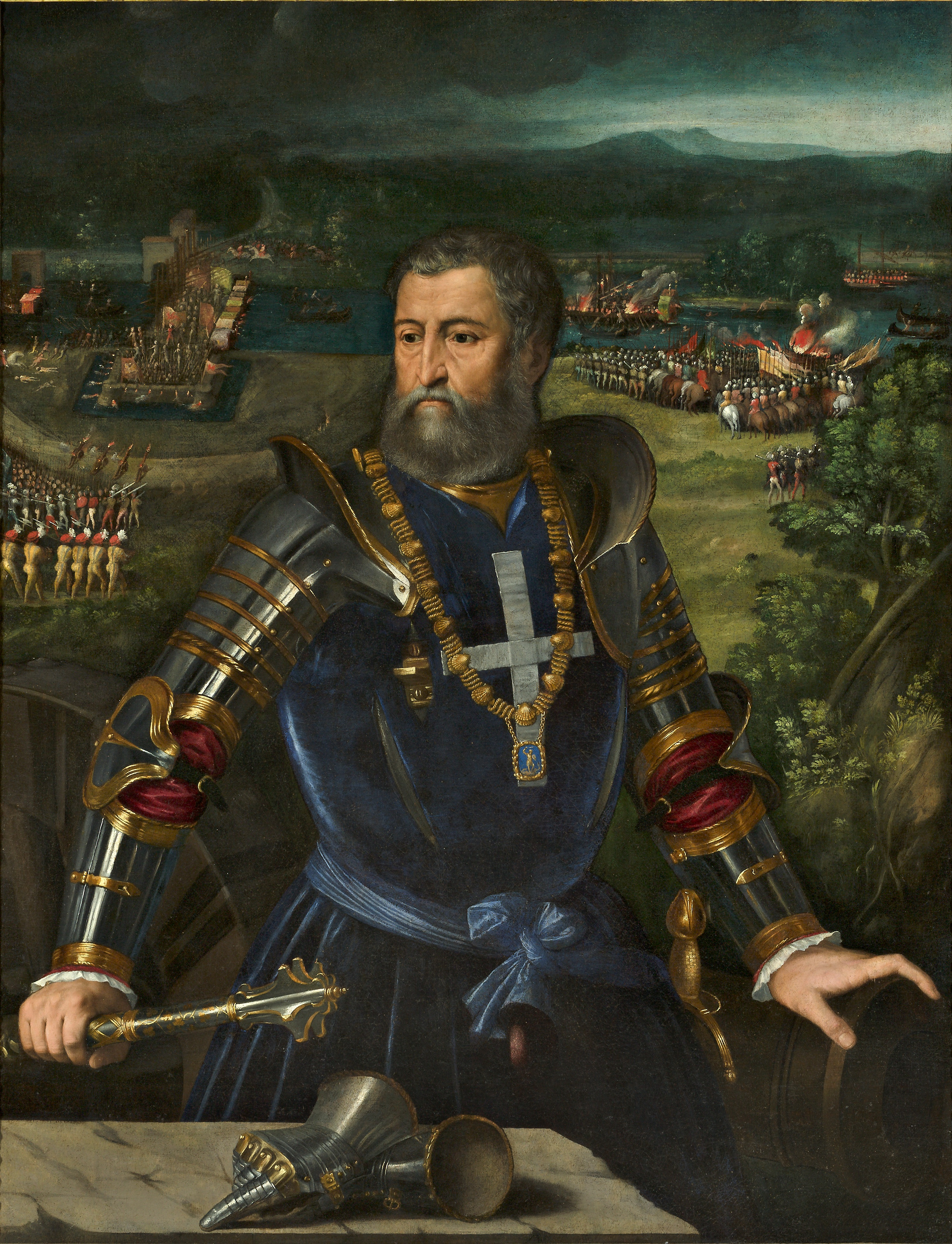
Alfonso d'Este as Knight of the Order of Saint Michael, by Dosso Dossi

Alfonso was the son of Ercole I d'Este, Duke of Ferrara and Eleanor of Naples, and became duke on Ercole's death in January 1505.

In the first year of his rule he uncovered a plot by his brother Ferrante and half-brother Giulio d'Este, directed against him and his other brother Ippolito. In September 1506 a trial for lèse majesté and high treason was held and, as expected, the death sentence was passed, but just as Ferrante and Giulio were about to mount the gallows they were informed that the duke had commuted their sentence to life imprisonment. They were led away to two cells in the Torre dei Leoni. Ferrante died in his cell after 34 years of imprisonment, while Giulio held on until he was pardoned in 1559, after 53 years of imprisonment, well after Alfonso's death. After his release, Giulio was ridiculed in the streets of Ferrara for his outdated clothes.

=== Italian Wars ===
In the Italian Wars Alfonso preserved his precarious position among the contending powers by flexibility and vigilance and the unrivalled fortifications of Ferrara. During the first war, he fought with the Holy League against King Charles VIII of France, assisting his brother-in-law Ludovico Sforza from Milan, while his brother Ferrante fought for Charles instead. A bout of syphilis, however, prevented him from commanding the Ferrarese contingent in the Battle of Fornovo in 1495, where Francesco II Gonzaga was defeated by the French. Even then, the League was successful in expelling the French from the Italian peninsula after the Siege of Atella.

==== War of the League of Cambrai ====
In 1508, he entered the League of Cambrai against Venice, acting as Gonfaloniere for the army of Pope Julius II. Two years later, however, he did not accept Julius' peace with Venice and hostile turn against France, which was politically inconvenient for Ferrara. He remained an ally of Louis XII of France and warred against the League instead. When the Bolognesi rebelled against Julius and toppled Michelangelo's bronze statue of the Pope from above the gate, Alfonso received the shards and recast them as a cannon named La Giulia, which he set on the ramparts of the castello. Julius excommunicated him and declared his fiefs forfeit.

Alfonso fought successfully against the Venetian and Papal armies, winning the Battle of Polesella, capturing Bologna, and playing a major part in the French victory at the Battle of Ravenna. These successes were based on Ferrara's artillery, produced in his own foundry, which was the best of its time. In both of his portraits by Titian, (Compare illustration above) he poses with his arm across the mouth of one of his cannon. In 1518 he sought the support of King Francis I of France to recover his feud of Modena from the Pope Leo X's hands, but it was unsuccessful, so he briefly waged war against the Papacy by himself.

==== War of the League of Cognac ====
In 1526, Alfonso was called to join the League of Cognac against King of Spain and Holy Roman Emperor Charles V, but he clashed with the new pope, Clement VII, promoter of the League, who similarly refused to grant him the feud. Increasingly courted by Charles' diplomats, Alfonso eventually joined the emperor. He supplied him with artillery in barges through the Po river, arming the landsknechts of imperial general Georg von Frundsberg with especially made falconets. One of his cannons decisively killed the League's land general Giovanni delle Bande Nere in Governolo. The admiral of the League, Andrea Doria, changed sides and joined the emperor, like Alfonso and their Milanese lieutenant Gian Giacomo Medici had done themselves, eventually granting him the victory in the war. With Charles' help, in 1530 Clement VII lifted Alfonso's excommunication and recognized him as possessor of the forfeited duchies of Modena and Reggio.

== Marriages and issue ==
In January 1491, Alfonso married Anna Maria Sforza, the niece of Ludovico Sforza, Duke of Milan. The wedding was part of a double marriage arranged by Leonardo da Vinci, during which Ludovico himself married Alfonso's younger sister, Beatrice d'Este. Alfonso and Anna had one daughter who died in childbirth.

The marriage was primarily political, aimed at cementing ties between the Este and Sforza families. However, the alliance effectively ended with the deaths of both Anna (30 November 1497) and Beatrice (January 1497).

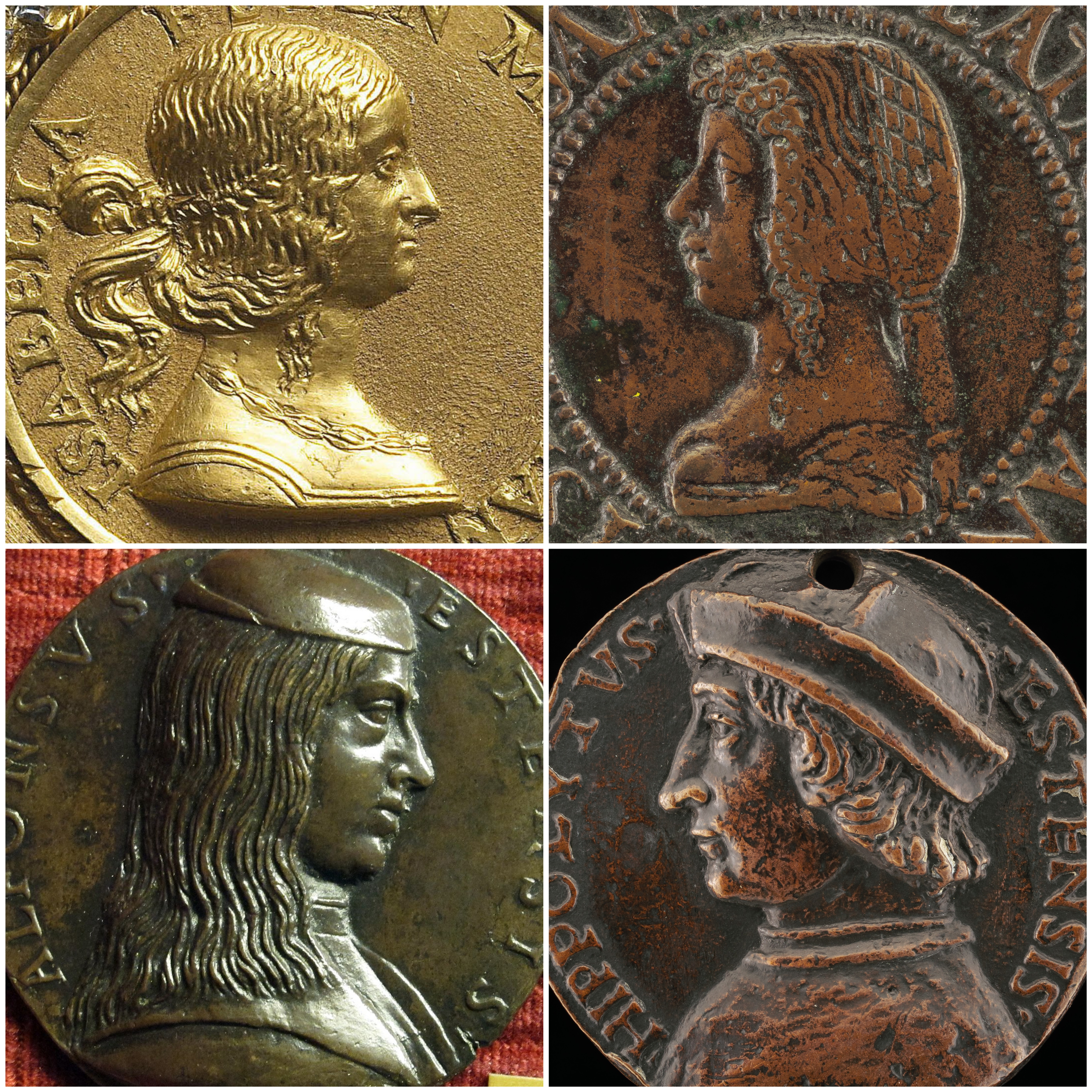
The Este siblings' medals: Isabella, Beatrice, Alfonso, and Ippolito.

In 1501, Alfonso married Lucrezia Borgia. They had:

1. A stillborn daughter (1502);
2. Alessandro d'Este (1505–1505);
3. Ercole II d'Este, Duke of Ferrara (5 April 1508 – 3 October 1559)
4. Ippolito II d'Este (25 August 1509 – 1 December 1572), Archbishop of Milan and later Cardinal
5. Alessandro d'Este (1514–1516)
6. Leonora d'Este (3 July 1515 – 15 July 1575), a nun and composer
7. Francesco d'Este, Marquess of Massalombarda (1 November 1516 – 2 February 1578)
8. Isabella Maria d'Este (born and died on 14 June 1519)

After Lucrezia's death on 24 June 1519, Alfonso formed a union with Laura Dianti, by whom he had two illegitimate sons (later legitimized): Alfonso and Alfonsino d'Este.

== Art ==
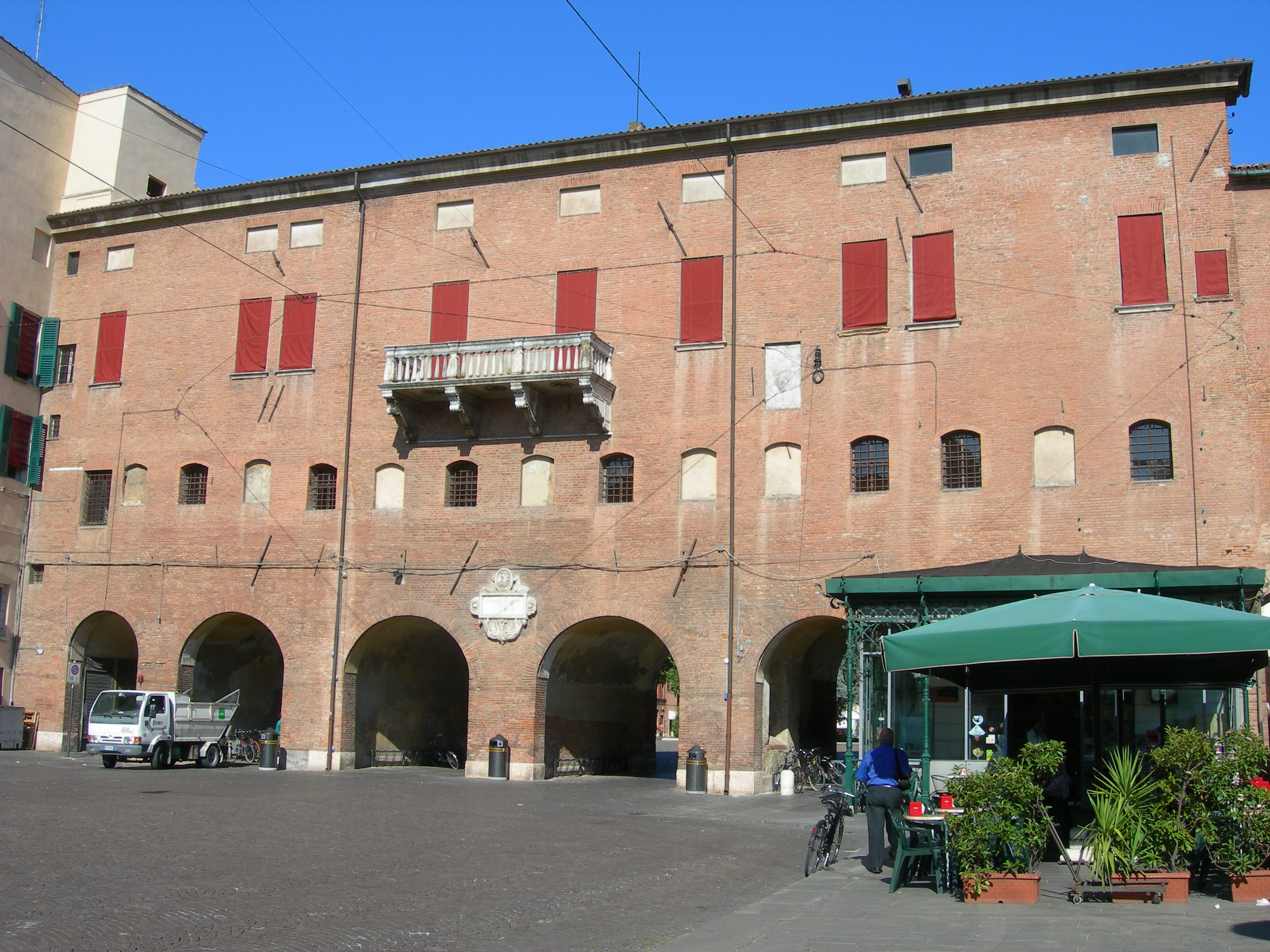
Via Coperta

Like his sister Isabella d'Este, and brother Ippolito I, Cardinal d'Este, he was one of the great patrons of art of his time: for him the elderly Giovanni Bellini painted The Feast of the Gods in 1514, Bellini's last completed painting. He turned to Bellini's pupil, Titian, for a sequence of paintings. In 1529 Alfonso created the most magnificent gallery of his time, his studiolo or camerino d'alabastro ("small alabaster room"), now usually known as his "Camerino", in order to better display his works of art against white marble-veneered walls under a gilded ceiling. The pallor of the marble led to the name of this room as the chamber of alabaster. There are documents from Mario Equicola on 9 October 1511, noting plans for painting of a room in Ferrara, in which six fables (fabule) or histories (istorie) shall be placed. I have already found them and have presented them in writing." A letter from Alfonso, dated 14 November 1514, authorized payment to Giovanni Bellini, the first painting completed for the chamber. Titian is known to have painted two portraits of Alfonso: the first was widely acclaimed, singled out by Michelangelo and coerced as a diplomatic gift by Charles V, Holy Roman Emperor; Alfonso induced Titian to paint a free replica, which the artist of the painting illustrated above has adapted for his model. Over the next two decades, Titian added three more paintings: The Worship of Venus (Museo del Prado, Madrid), The Bacchanal of the Andrians (Prado, Madrid), and Bacchus and Ariadne (National Gallery, London). Dosso Dossi produced another large bacchanal, and he also contributed ceiling decorations and a painted frieze for the cornice, depicting scenes from the Aeneid, which gained immediacy by showing the heroes in contemporary dress (illustration, left). All the bacchanals in the Alabaster Chamber dealt with love, and some refer to marriage. After the Este family lost control of Ferrara in 1598, the Alabaster Chamber's paintings and sculptures were dispersed.

Alfonso inherited from Cardinal d'Este the poet Ariosto. Following in the lead of his father Ercole, who had made Ferrara into one of the musical centres of Europe, Alfonso brought some of the most famous musicians of the time to his court to work as composers, instrumentalists and singers. Musicians from northern Europe who worked at Ferrara during his reign included Antoine Brumel and Adrian Willaert, the latter of whom was to become the founder of the Venetian School, something which could not have happened without Alfonso's patronage.

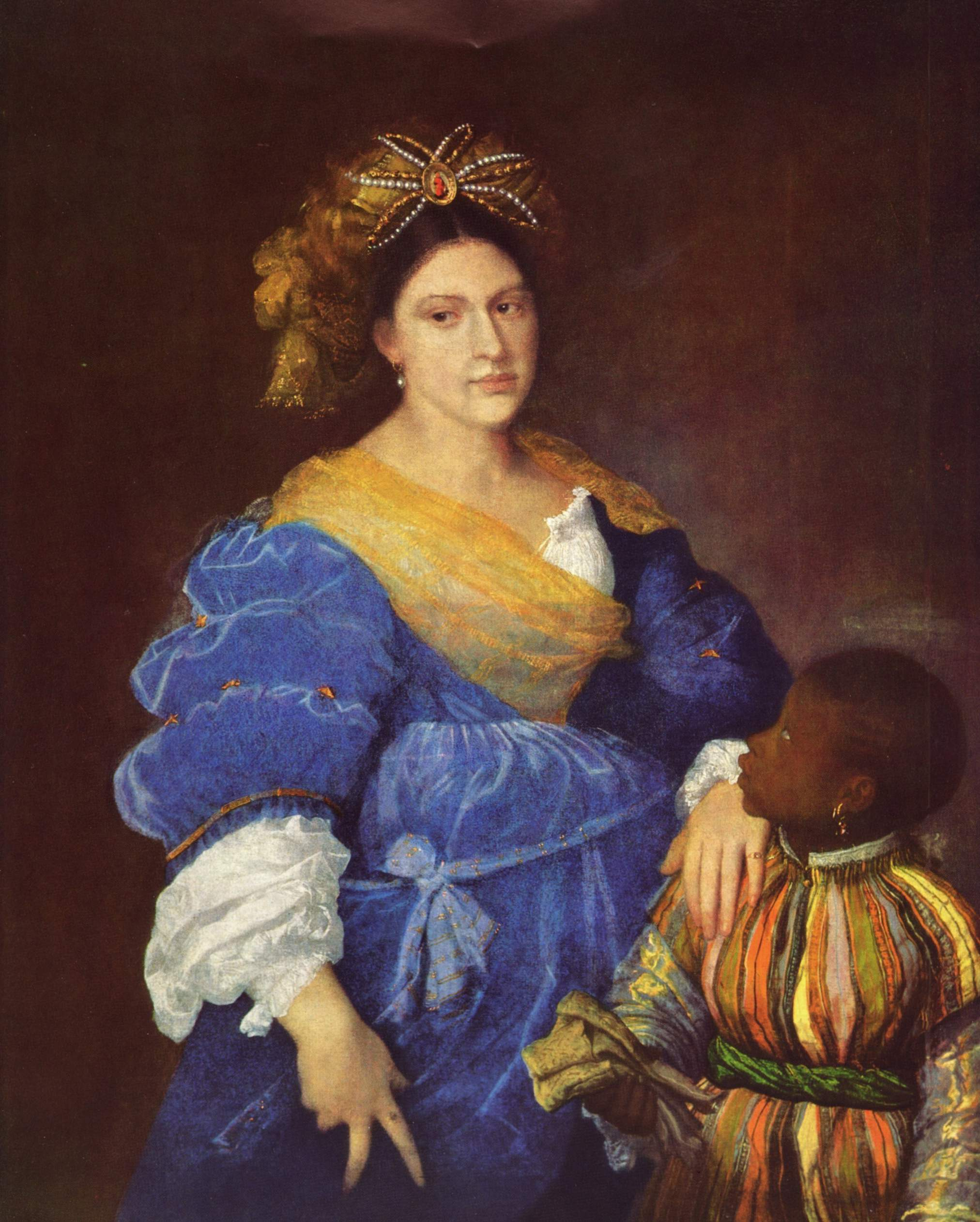
Titian: Portrait of Laura Dianti, 1523

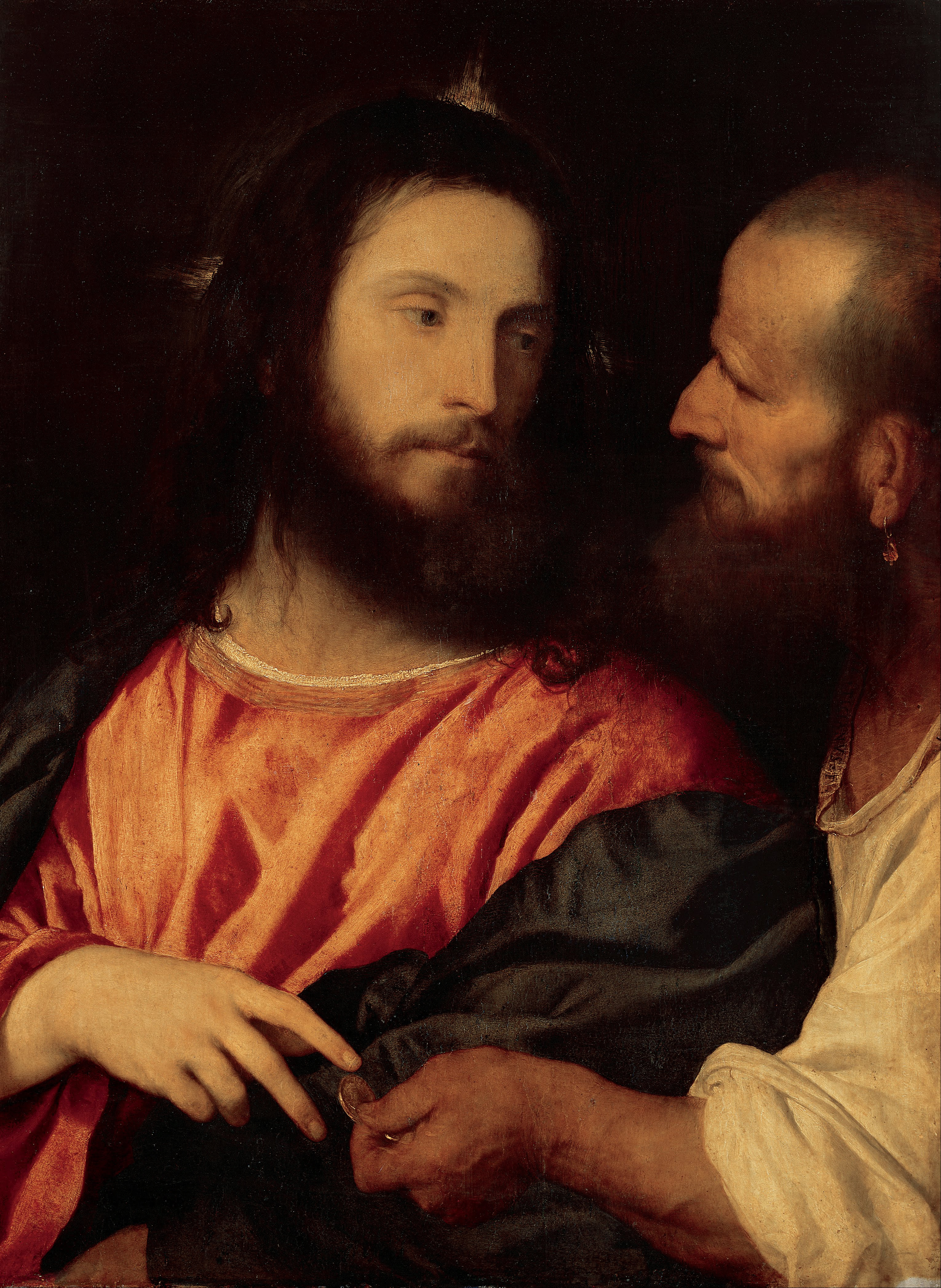
The Tribute Money painted by Titian for Alfonso

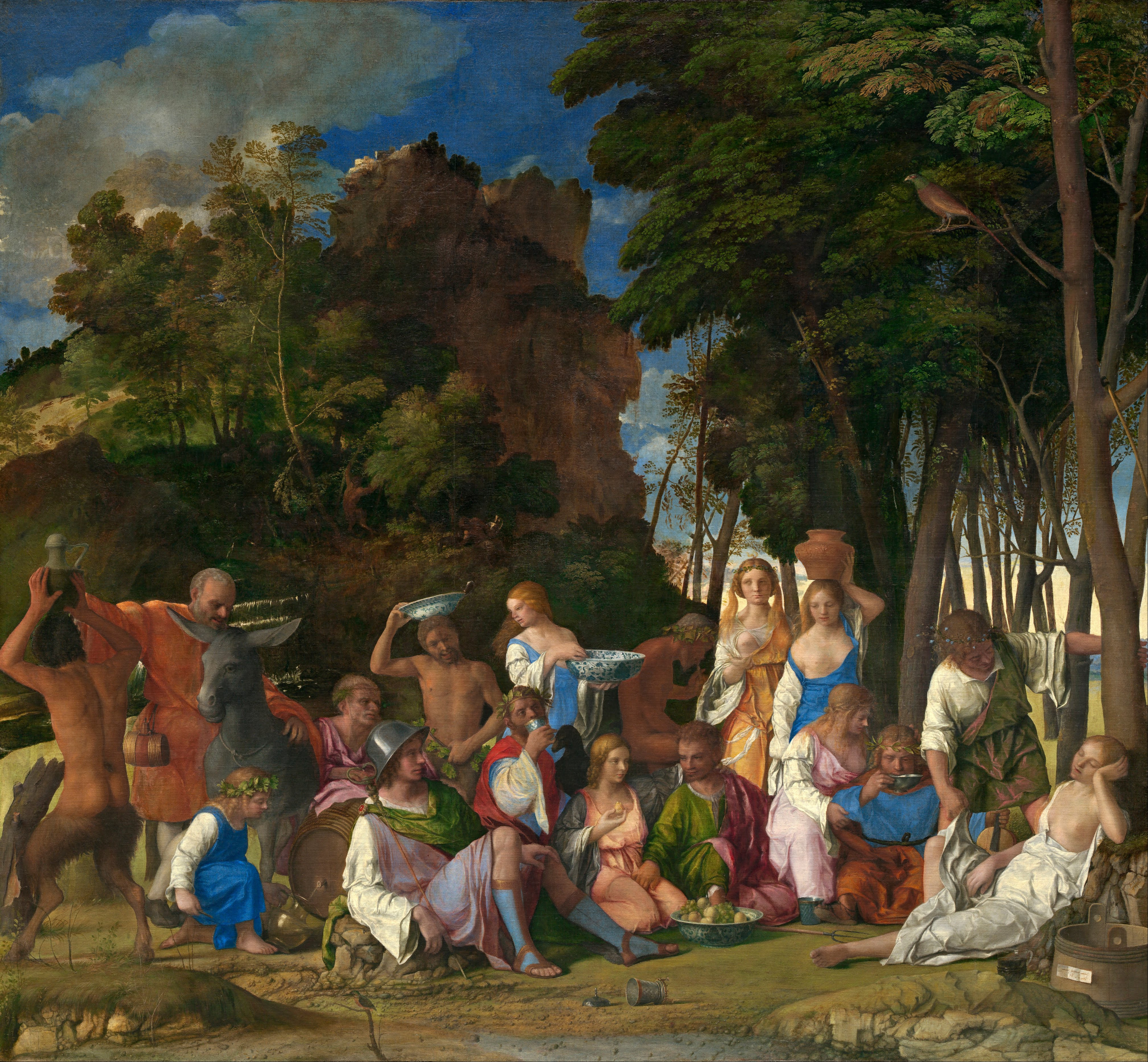
The Feast of the Gods by Giovanni Bellini and Titian

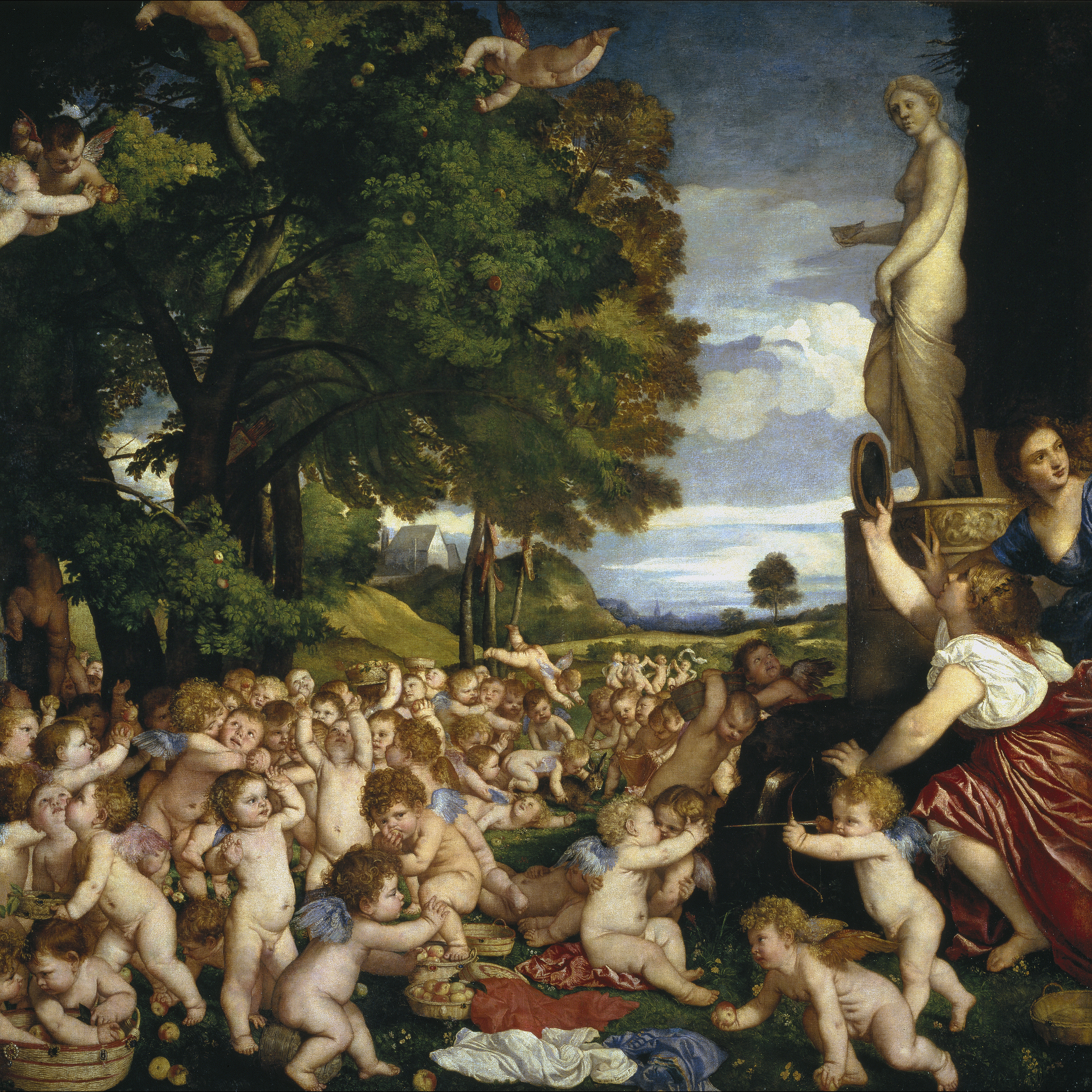
The Worship of Venus by Titian

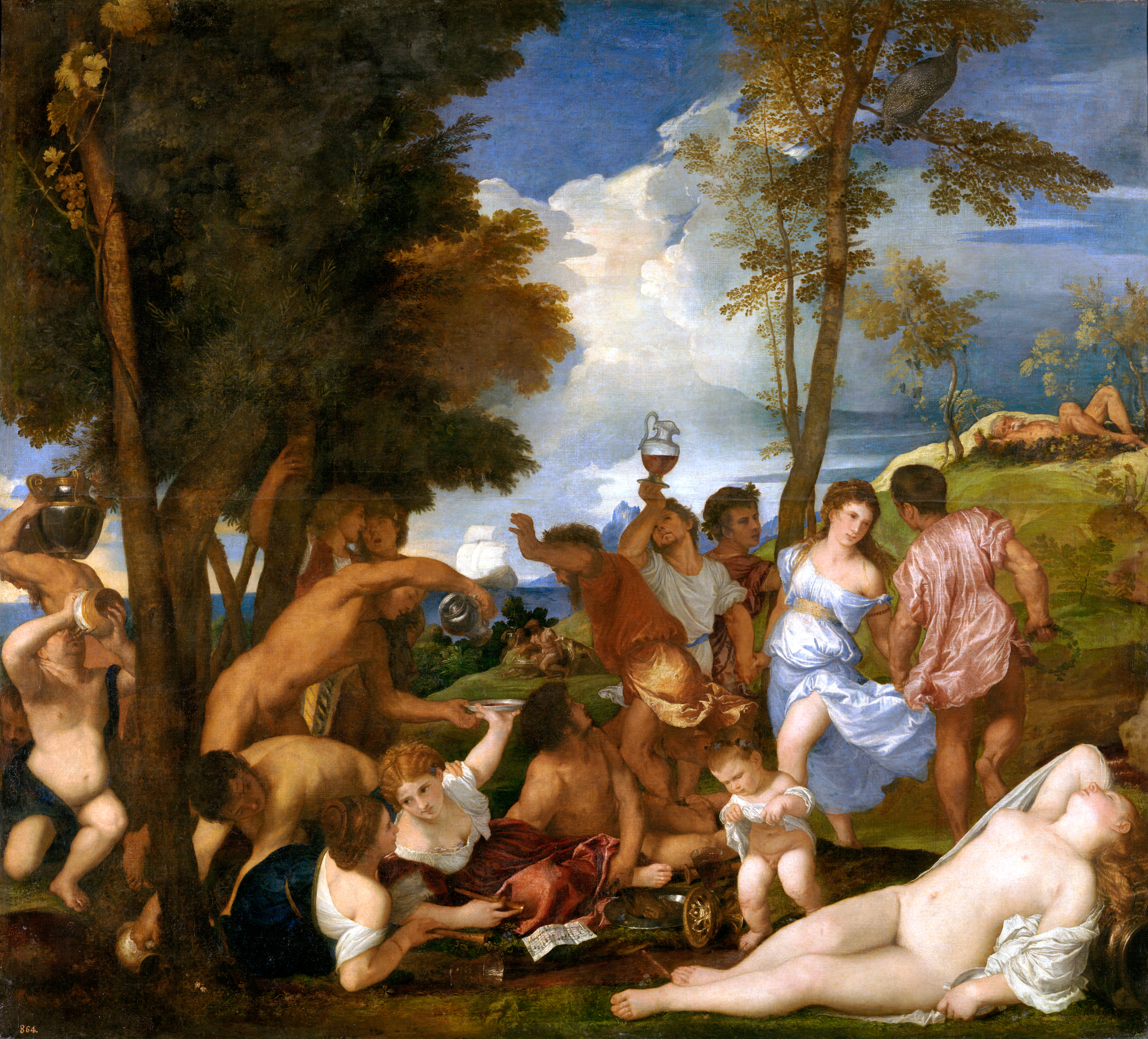
Bacchanal of the Andrians by Titian

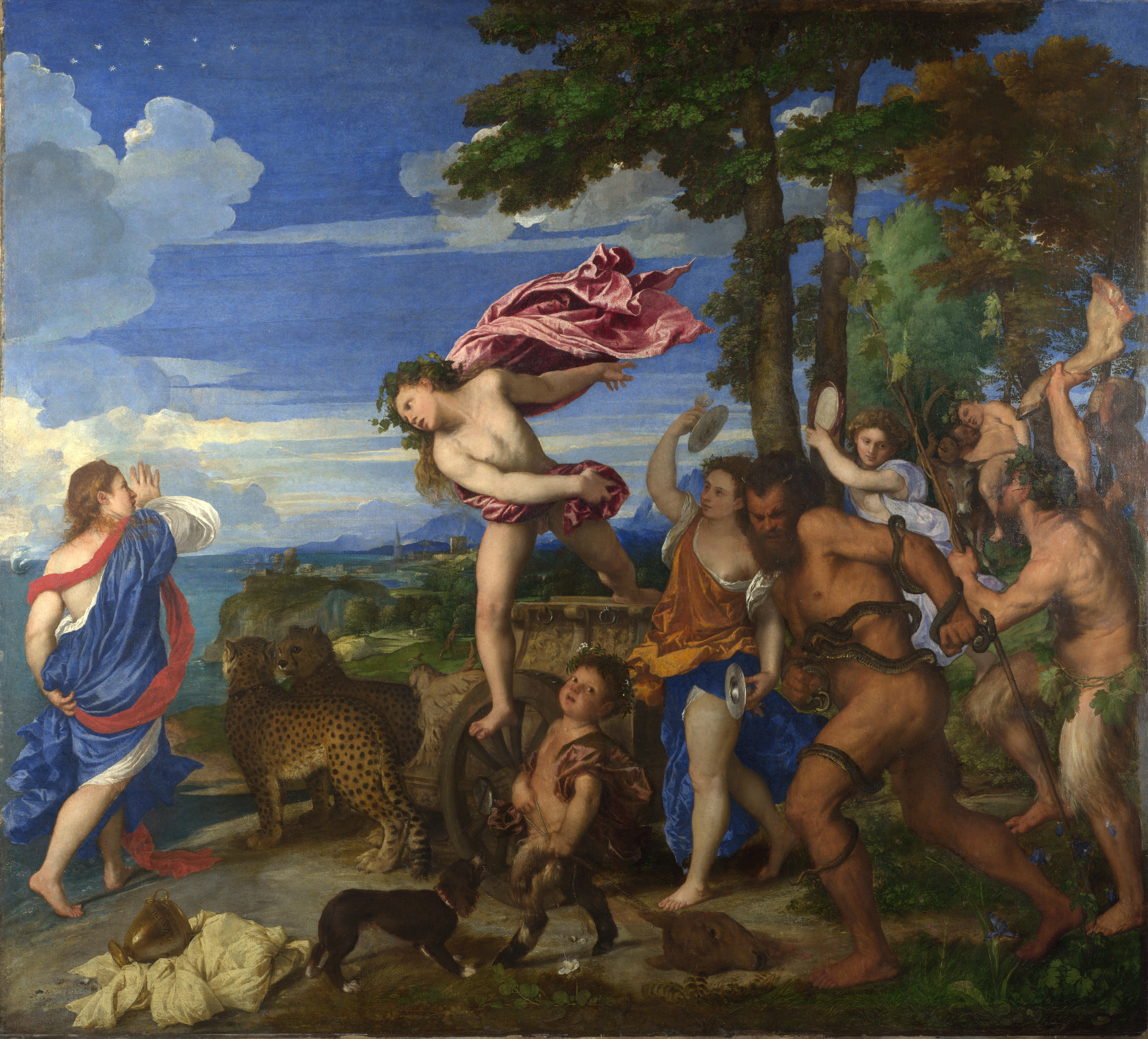
Bacchus and Ariadne by Titian

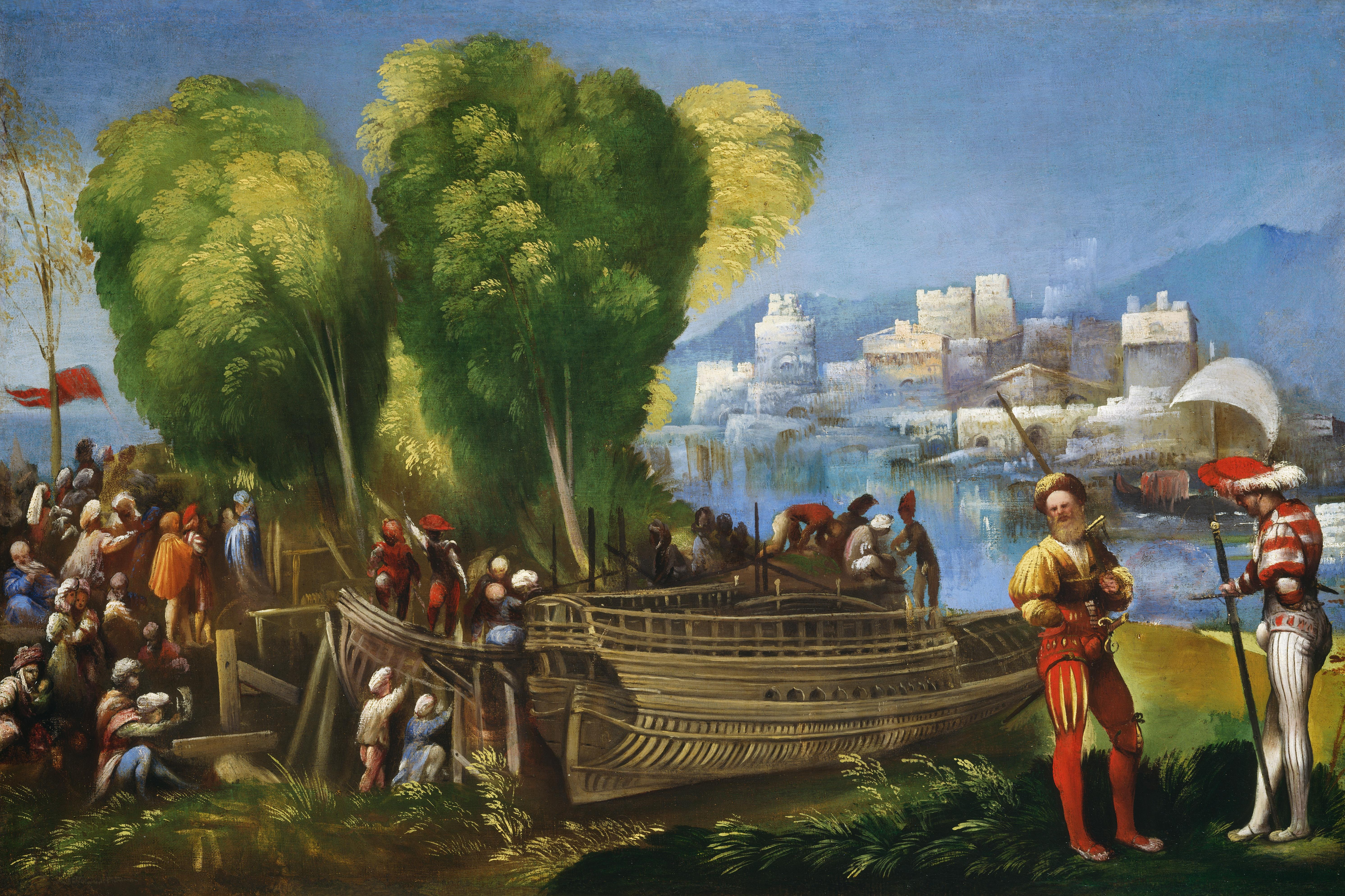
Aeneas and Achates on the Libyan shore, painted by Dosso Dossi for Alfonso's camerino d'alabastro (National Gallery of Art, Washington).

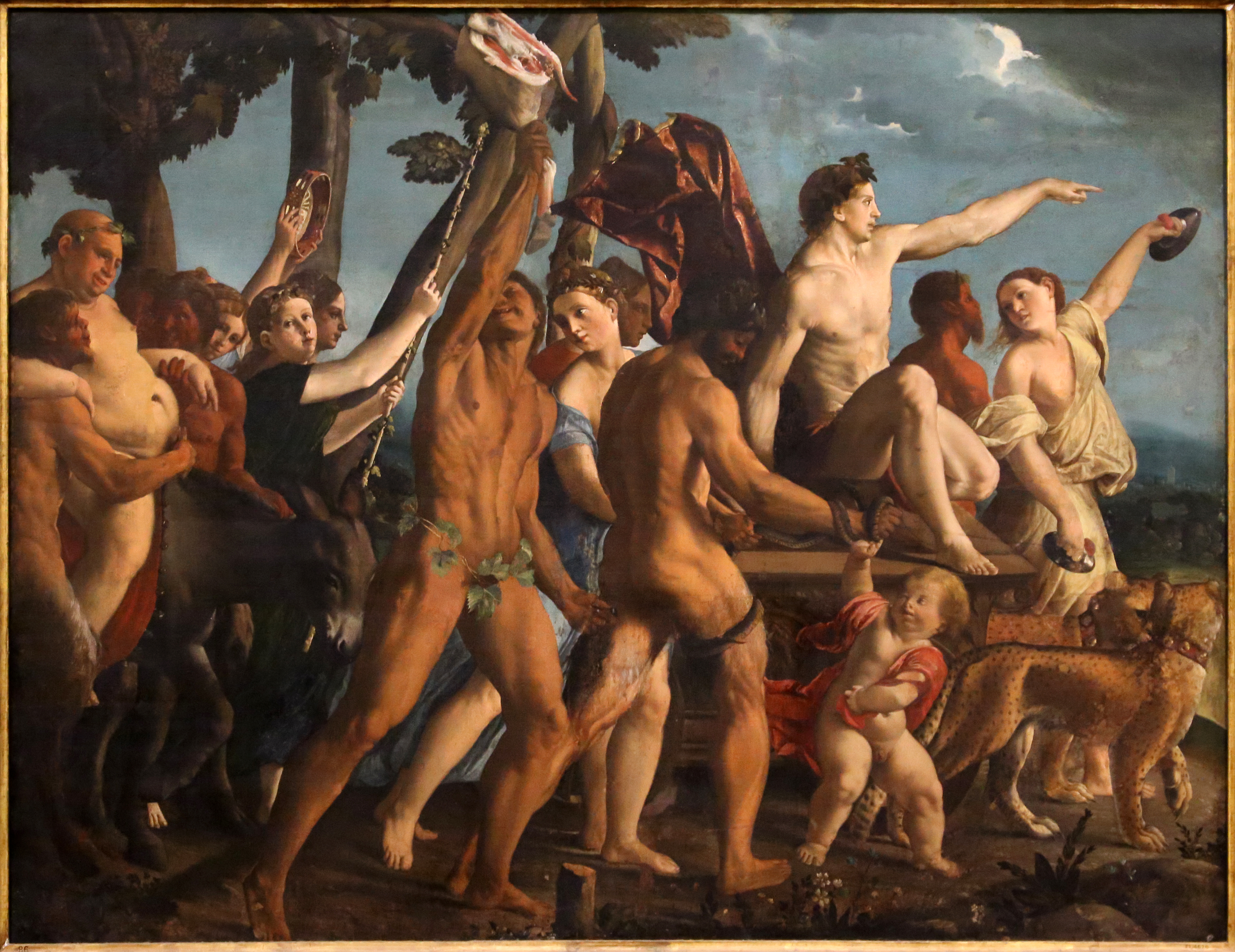
Trimph of Baccus by Dosso Dossi for Alfonso's camerino d'alabastro

== History ==
When Alfonso's grandson Alfonso II d'Este—Robert Browning's duke of "My Last Duchess"—produced no male heir, the main d'Este line died out. A grandson of Alfonso I and cousin of Alfonso II, Cesare d'Este had been born out of wedlock. He was recognized by the Emperor but not by the Pope, who took the Duchy of Ferrara by force. Nevertheless, the House of Este continued in Modena and Reggio.

== See also ==
- House of Este
- Italian Wars

== Bibliography ==
- Cadenas, Vicente (1978). La herencia imperial de Carlos V en Italia: el milanesado. Hidalguía. ISBN 9788400037284.
- Celati, Maria (2023). "Conflict and Reconciliation in Italian Renaissance Conspiracies: Literary Sources and Political Perspectives". In Kraye, Jill; Laureys, Marc; Lines, David A. (eds.). Management and Resolution of Conflict and Rivalries in Renaissance Europe. Bonn University Press. pp. 11–36. ISBN 9783847006282.
- Colantuono, Anthony (2010). "Estense Patronage and the Construction of the Ferrarese Renaissance, c.1395-1598". In Rosenberg, Charles M. (ed.). The Court Cities of Northern Italy: Milan, Parma, Piacenza, Mantua, Ferrara, Bologna, Urbino, Pesaro, and Rimini. Cambridge University Press. pp. 196–243. ISBN 9780521792486.
- Marchi, Cesare (1982). Giovanni dalle Bande Nere (in Italian). Rizzoli. ISBN 978-88-17-36450-8.
- Osborne, Toby (2026). Popes and Papal Rome, 1503-1655: The Theatre of the World. Bloomsbury Academic. ISBN 9781472579744.
- Prignano, Gaia (2020). "Music Theories and Identity Issues: Depicting Canons chez Alfonso I d'Este". Music in Art: International Journal for Music Iconography. 45 (1–2): 53–71. ISSN 1522-7464.
- Taylor, Frederick Lewis (1973). The Art of War in Italy, 1494–1529. Westport: Greenwood Press. ISBN 0-8371-5025-6.

Alfonso I d'Este House of Este Born: 21 July 1476 Died: 31 October 1534
Regnal titles
Preceded by Ercole I	Duke of Ferrara, Modena and Reggio; 1505–1534 forfeit 1510–1530	Succeeded by Ercole II
