= Eleanor of Naples, Duchess of Ferrara =

Ferrarese duchess and political figure (1450–1493)

Eleanor of Naples
- Duchess of Ferrara, of Modena and Reggio
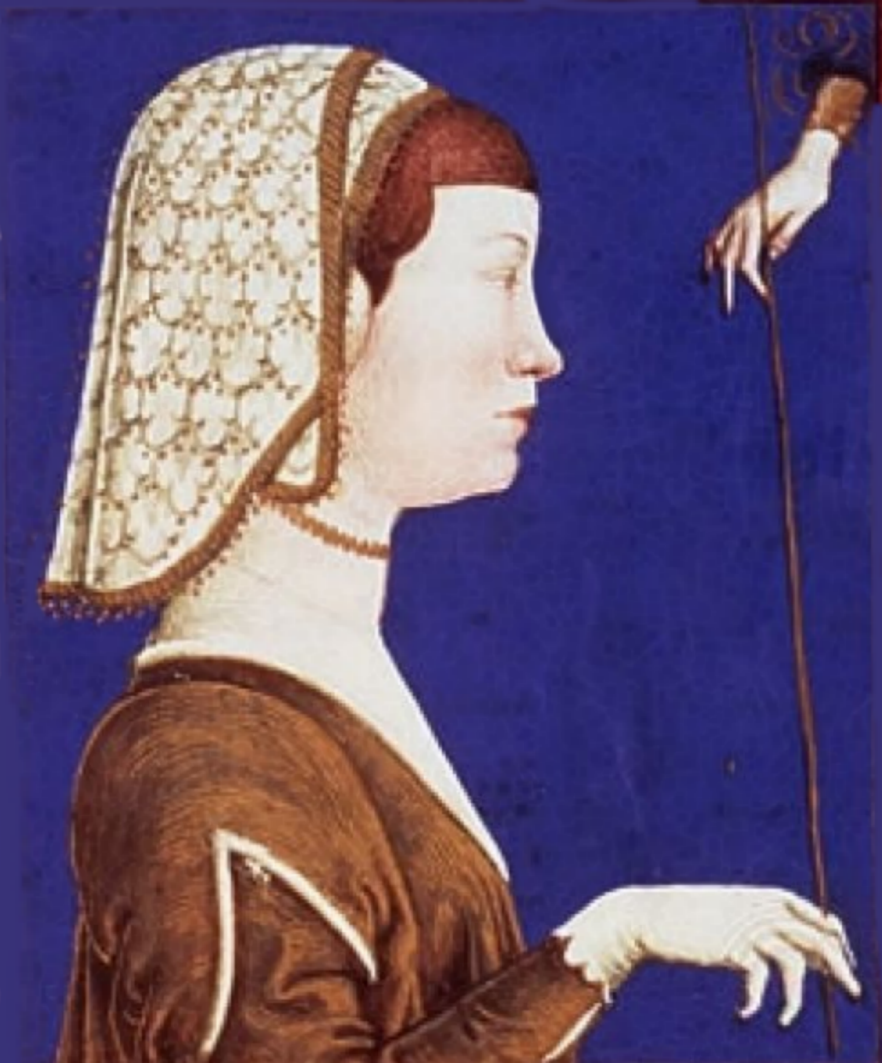
- Portrait from a manuscript Il modo di regere e di regnare by Antonio Cornazzano.
- Born: 22 June 1450; Naples, Kingdom of Naples
- Died: 11 October 1493 (aged 43); Ferrara, Duchy of Ferrara
- Spouse: Sforza Maria Sforza, Duke of Bari; Ercole I d'Este, Duke of Ferrara
- Issue: Isabella; Beatrice; Alfonso; Ferrante; Ippolito; Sigismondo
- House: Trastámara
- Father: Ferdinand I of Naples
- Mother: Isabella of Clermont

Eleanor of Naples (Leonora or Eleonora of Aragon; 22 June 1450 – 11 October 1493) was Duchess of Ferrara by marriage to Ercole I d'Este. She was the first duchess of Ferrara, and mother of many famous Renaissance figures. She was a well known political figure, and served as regent of Ferrara during the absence of her spouse.

== Life ==
Born on 22 June 1450, Eleanor was the daughter King Ferdinand I of Naples and Isabella of Clermont. Born into wealth, she was the first daughter, and second child, born into her family of six brothers and sisters.

Not much is known of Eleanor's childhood or early life growing up as the first princess of Naples but she was betrothed to Sforza Maria Sforza, Duke of Bari, son of Francesco Sforza I and Bianca Maria Visconti, at the age of five. In 1465 she was married by proxy to Sforza Maria but because of his father's death and his brother Galeazzo's succession and subsequent refusal to honour the marriage settlements, the marriage was never consummated. Her father, after trying to break the marriage contract so that Eleanor could marry someone else, only succeeded in doing so after reaching an agreement where Eleanor's niece Isabella of Aragon would marry Galeazzo's son and heir.

=== Duchess of Ferrara ===
Eleanor would go on to marry Ercole d’Este (26 October 1431 – 15 June 1505) in July 1473, her supposed second husband. It is claimed that this marriage was met with much celebration. Ercole was said to be, “…an unscrupulous and devious ruler.” He came to be Duke of Ferrara in 1471, taking the title upon the death of his half-brother, Borso d'Este, and would rule until his death in 1503.

When she was passed through Rome in June 1473, on her way to marry Ercole d’Este, Duke of Ferrara, she was received grandly (she would go on to marry him a month later). Two nephews of Rodrigo Borgia, who was a cardinal at the time, were there to greet her. They wanted to make a good and lasting impression on the Neapolitan Princess. She wrote to her father that she was given a lavish apartment, stating that even her chamber pot was made of gilded silver. In her correspondence with her father, she spoke of the banquet thrown for her, organized by Pietro Riario, nephew of Pope Sixtus IV, which lasted six hours, and it was an endless succession of food, accompanied by music, dancing and poetry. “The treasures of the Church, is being put to such uses,” she wrote in astonishment in her letter. This has been suspected to be a political power play by the Borgias, and by their Riario and della Rovere political rivals, in attempt of gaining favor with royalty and gaining more political power.

Despite her husband's ill temper, Eleanor was said to have been an active and dedicated spouse. She ruled in her husband's stead when he was absent. He was absent in 1482–1484, when he fought a war with the Republic of Venice. Due to growing up in the Aragonese court of Naples, she brought with her much political knowledge and advice, and was said to show an extreme amount of common sense. Eleanor undertook the modernisation of the Castello Estense in Ferrara, transforming its Torre Marchesana in new lodgings and first constructed the terrace garden now known as the Garden of Oranges.

=== Death ===
Eleanor died on 1493, at the age of 43. The circumstances are unknown. Her eldest son Alfonso viewed his mother as one of the women he cared for the most, and he was deeply affected when he lost her at the age of seventeen. Due to the fact that his mother and sister, Beatrice, whom he also loved deeply, died at such a young age, Alfonso viewed marriage as merely a painful duty, viewing his new bride Lucrezia with little interest.

== Legacy ==
With her entrance as a political figure, governing in her husband's place, she was a great influence to many. She was the inspiration for works such as Antonio Cornazzano's Del modo di regere et di regnare, which he dedicated to her. Da Ladibus Mulierum (In Praise of Women) by Bartolomeo Goggio was also dedicated to her. Having these works dedicated to her, could heavily suggest that she was a patron, someone with much money and high status who will commission an artist or writer for a work. Most times these works were an attempt to gain more political favor.

She was an eloquent writer and showed a great amount of political prowess when she wrote letters. It is through this that we can see the court of Ferrara had a more positive attitude towards women, with many influences coming from highly educated women. It is considered rare for women during this period to be praised highly for their political prowess. Her more gentle nature and need for more intellectual conversations, led her to a more subtle political rule, making it difficult to find much on her ruling, when compared to, for example, Caterina Sforza, who ruled Forlì in her husband's stead as well. There is a connection between the two women, as Eleanor's daughter, Beatrice, married into the Sforza family. Eleanor, along with her daughters, in particular her daughter Isabella, was considered to be a new representation of status amongst women.

== Children ==
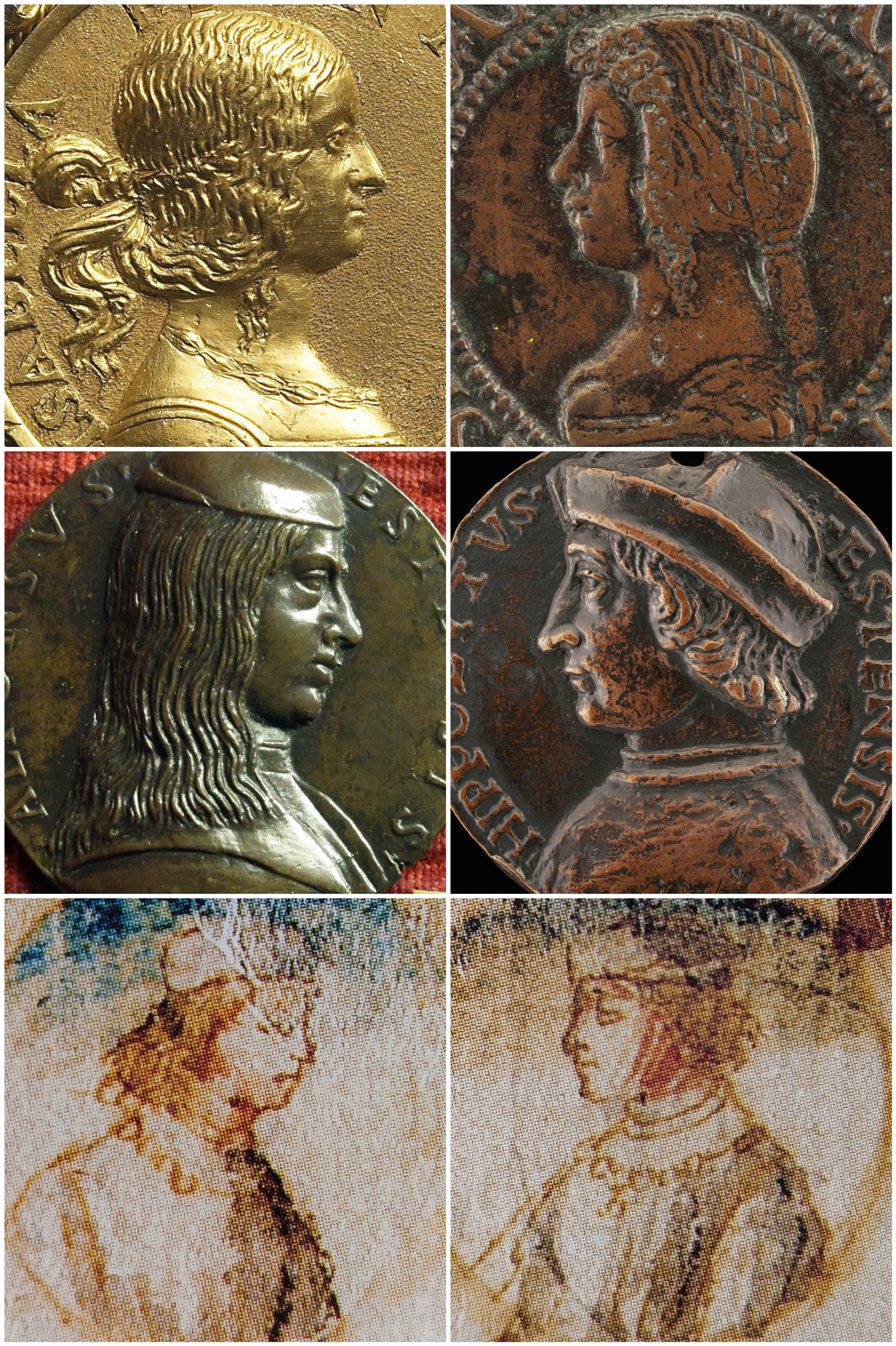
Legitimate children of Hercules and Eleanor: Isabella, Alfonso, Ferrante, Ippolito and Sigismondo had inherited the typical Este nose of their father; Beatrice the slightly upturned one of her mother. Furthermore, all were dark-haired, except Ferrante and Sigismondo, who had recovered, as it seems, the traditional blond of the Este.

Ercole I d'Este and Duchess Eleanor had seven children:

- Isabella (1474–1539), married Francesco II Gonzaga, Marquess of Mantua, and became one of the most famous women of the Renaissance. Her style of dress made her a fashion icon, and she would soon be copied by numerous French women. When her brother, Alfonso, married Lucrezia Borgia, Isabella viewed her as a rival, and quickly snubbed all her attempts at friendship. It was in 1502 that Lucrezia, her brother's wife, would start an intense and passionate affair, said to be more sexual than loving, with Isabella's husband. It is stated, and heavily assumed, that Isabella was the model for Leonardo da Vinci's famous painting, The Mona Lisa.
- Beatrice (1475–1497), who married Ludovico Sforza, Duke of Milan. She, along with her sister was stated to be one of the most influential women of the Renaissance. They were known particularly for their fashionable state of dress. It is said that during her marriage with Ludovico, Leonardo da Vinci conducted the orchestra at the wedding.
- Alfonso (1476–1534), who married as his second wife, Lucrezia Borgia. He was to be her final husband; they had ten children. It was during this marriage that Lucrezia greatly supported her husband and stood up in her role of Duchess of Ferrara, ruling in Alfonso's stead when he was away fighting Julius II. It was during the pregnancy of her tenth child, a daughter born prematurely, that Lucrezia fell ill and would die. Alfonso was said to grieve her death so heavily, that he fainted at her funeral. He wrote that he found it hard not to weep, when he thought of himself being separated from such a dear wife. This marriage was said to be reluctantly agreed upon by Alfonso's father, in hopes that it would improve his relation with the Papal States.
- Ferrante (1477–1540)
- Ippolito (1479–1520), cardinal and patron of the arts. Educated for a life in the Church, he was said to have been head of abbacy by the age of six. He would benefit greatly from his brother's marriage to Lucrezia Borgia.
- Sigismondo (1480–1524),
- Alberto (1481-1482), who died in early infancy.

== Sources ==
- Hibbert, Christopher. The Borgias and Their Enemies: 1431-1519. Orlando: Harcourt, 2008.
- "DIOMEDE CARAFA (1406?-1487), De Boni Principis Officiis [De Regentis Et Boni Principis Officiis], Translation from the Italian by BATTISTA GUARINI." Carafa Renaissance Manuscripts Guarini. http://www.textmanuscripts.com/medieval/carafa-boni-guarini-60675.
- Marek, George R. The Bed and the Throne: The Life of Isabella D'Este. New York: Harper & Row, 1976
- Lewis, Francis-Ames: Isabella and Leonardo. Yale University Press (New Haven) 2012
- Franklin, Margaret Ann. Boccaccio's Heroines: Power and Virtue in Renaissance Society. Burlington: Ashgate, 2006.
- Bizzarri, Claudia. "Il principe umanista". Medioevo
- Commire, Anne; Klezmer, Deborah, eds. (1999). "Leonora of Aragon (1450-1493)". Women in World History: A Biographical Encyclopedia. Vol. 9:Laa-Lyud. Yorkin.

Eleanor of Naples, Duchess of Ferrara House of Trastámara Born: 22 June 1450 Died: 11 October 1493
Royal titles
Vacant Title last held by Maria of Aragon as Marquise of Ferrara; Lady of Modena and Reggio	Duchess consort of Ferrara, Modena and Reggio; 3 July 1473 – 11 October 1493	Vacant Title next held by Lucrezia Borgia
