= Pellegrino Prisciani =

Italian astrologer

Pellegrino Prisciani (1435 – 1518) was an Italian astrologer, architect, historian and humanist scholar.

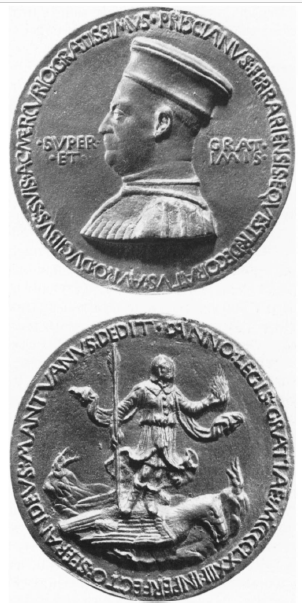
Coin showing Pellegrino Prisciano by Sperandino

He was active as a diplomat, archivist and personal advisor for Leonello d'Este and Borso d'Este, both leading figures of the Italian nobility, marquis and duke of Ferrara. In their service, he took the position of an ambassador in Venice and Rome.

At court, he was especially cherished for his astrological research. His most noticed publication was the history of the d'Este, called Historiae Ferrariensis. Most of his works were not published, but preserverd in various archives of Northern Italy.

A medal showing Pellegrino Prisciano in profile located at the British Museum today.

== Writings ==
- Historiae Ferrarienses or Annales ferrarienses
- Collectanea
- Ortopasca
- Spectacula
