= Ippolito d'Este =

Italian cardinal (1479–1520)

His Eminence Ippolito d'Este
- Cardinal-Deacon
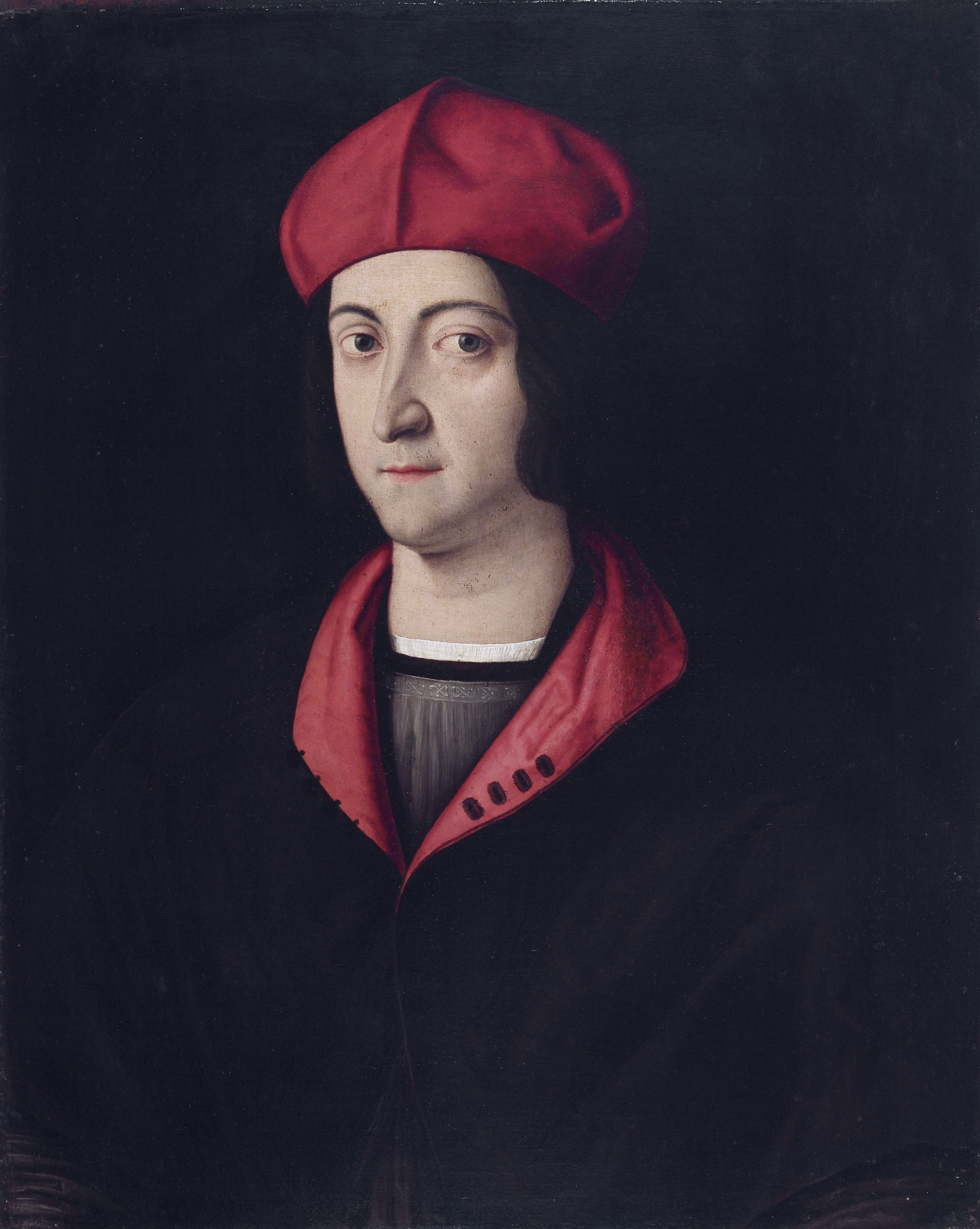
- Portrait by Bartolomeo Veneto
- Church: S. Lucia in Silice (1493–1520)
- Diocese: Esztergom (1487–1497); Milan (1497–1519); Eger (1497–1520); Capua (1502–1520); Ferrara (1503–1520)

Orders
- Ordination: none
- Consecration: none
- Created cardinal: 20 September 1493 by Pope Alexander VI

Personal details
- Born: 20 March 1479 Ferrara, Duchy of Ferrara
- Died: 3 September 1520 (aged 41) Ferrara, Duchy of Ferrara
- Buried: Ferrara Cathedral
- Residence: Esztergom, Ferrara, Rome
- Parents: Ercole d'Este; Eleanor of Aragon
- Occupation: courtier, politician
- Profession: cleric
- Education: home schooled, tutors
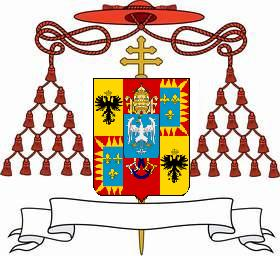
- Coat of arms

Ippolito (I) d'Este (Hungarian: Estei Hippolit; 20 March 1479 – 3 September 1520) was an Italian cardinal, and Archbishop of Esztergom. He was a member of the ducal House of Este of Ferrara, and was usually referred to as the Cardinal of Ferrara. Though a bishop of five separate dioceses, he was never consecrated a bishop. He spent much of his time supporting the ducal house of Ferrara and negotiating on their behalf with the Pope.

== Biography ==
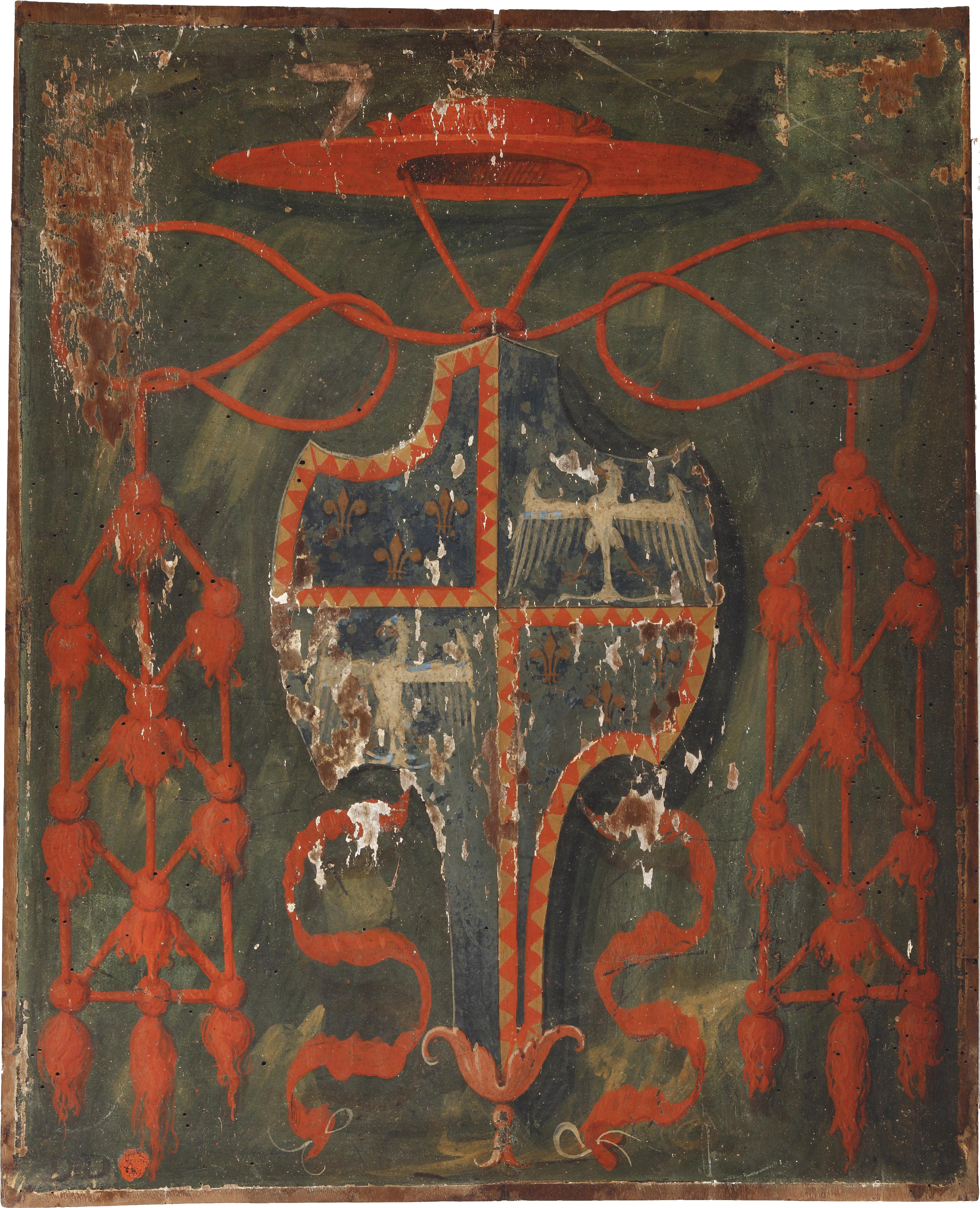
Coat of Arms of Cardinal Ippolito d'Este.

Born in Ferrara, Ippolito was the son of Duke Ercole I d'Este, Duke of Ferrara, and Eleanor of Naples, daughter of Ferdinand I of Naples. His eldest brother, Alfonso became duke in 1505, and married Lucrezia Borgia. He had another brother, Ferdinando, a brother Sigismondo, and two sisters, Beatrice (who married Ludovico Sforza) and Isabella (who married Duke Francesco of Mantua). He also had a half-brother, Giulio, and a half-sister, Lucrezia.

=== Youth ===
From infancy Ippolito was destined for a career in the Church, and at the age of three he was named Abbot Commendatory of Casalnovo. In December 1485, at the age of six, he received his first tonsure, and was named Abbot Commendatory of S. Maria di Pomposa (Ferrara). Two years later, on 27 May 1487, thanks to his aunt Beatrice of Aragon, who had married King Matthias Corvinus of Hungary, he was named archbishop of Esztergom in Hungary. The appointment by Pope Innocent VIII did not take effect, however, until he was eighteen. Ippolito nonetheless departed Ferrara for Hungary on 18 June 1487, accompanied by his cousin, Bishop Nicolò Maria d'Este of Adria; the departure was noted by Marino Sanuto in his Diarii, who traces his journey through Rovigo and Padua. Ippolito joined King Matthias and Queen Beatrice, his mother's sister, in Hungary.

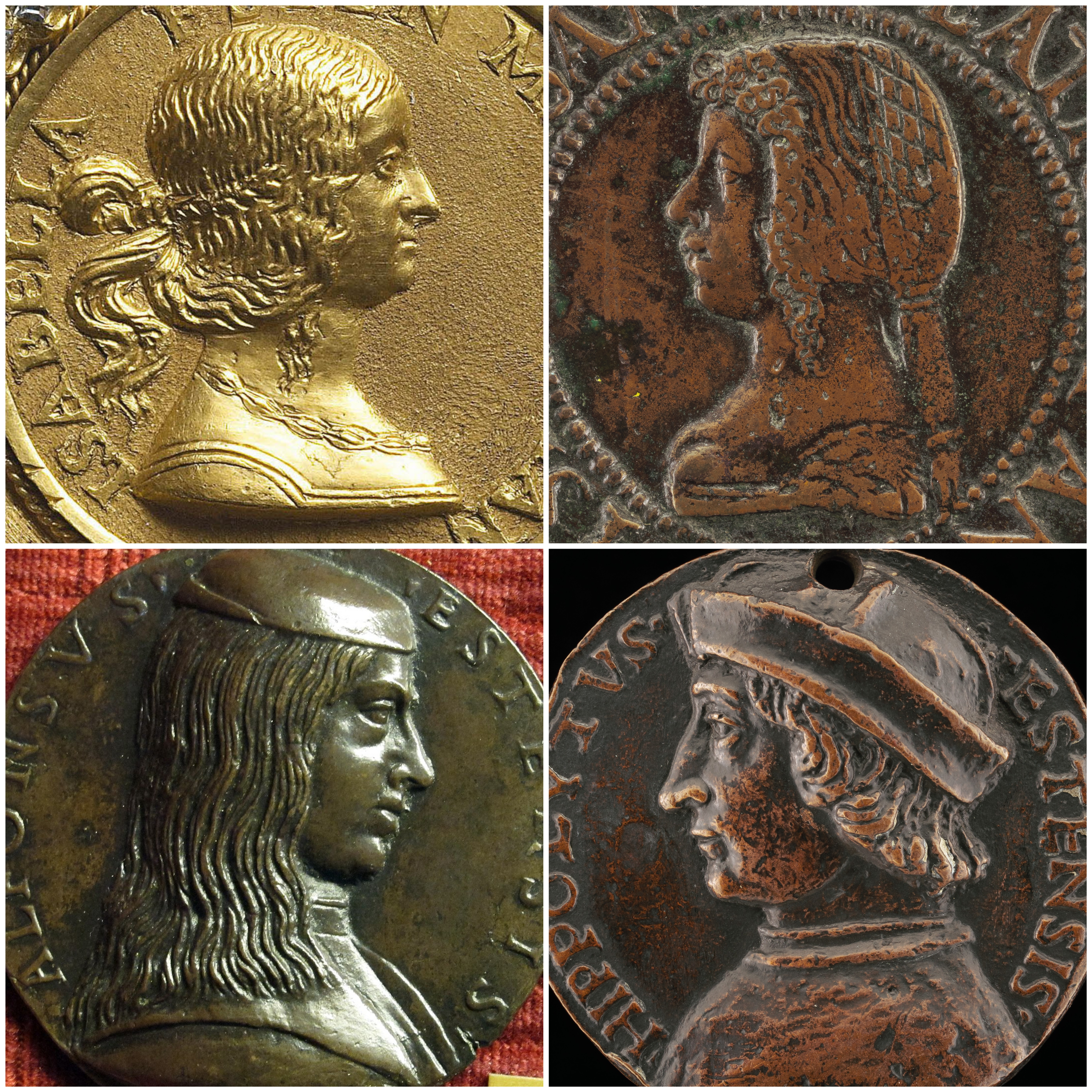
The Este siblings' medals: Isabella, Beatrice, Alfonso, and Ippolito.

=== Archbishop-elect of Esztergom ===
For the next seven years, as Administrator of Esztergom, Ippolito studied at the Hungarian court, and at his own princely court in Esztergom, which was made up of some 245 persons. He had brought with him volumes of Virgil's Aeneid and Plautus' comedies, and an Italian preceptor, Sebastiano da Lugo. He enjoyed the Episcopal Palace in Esztergom, but also had houses in Buda, Pressburg, and Vienna; he had houses built for himself at Érsekújvár and Aranyosmarót. He brought a French tailor with him from Ferrara.

After Matthias' death (6 April 1490), the atmosphere surrounding the Prince-Archbishop changed. He was no longer the nephew of the King, but was more and more looked on as a foreigner who enjoyed the fruits of his Hungarian archbishopric. His aunt married her late husband's competitor and successor, Vladislaus Jagiellon, King of Bohemia, who brought different policies and different personnel into the kingdom. Three years later Ippolito returned to Italy to escape the plague that was striking Hungary; he arrived in Rome with a following of 250 people.

=== Cardinal d'Este ===
D'Este was created cardinal by Pope Alexander VI on 20 September 1493, and named Cardinal-Deacon of S. Lucia in Silice three days later, after which he resided in Rome. He was only fourteen years old.

He was appointed archbishop of Milan on 8 November 1497, though he could only serve as Administrator, since he had not been consecrated a bishop. He governed the archdiocese of Milan through a vicar. According to the tax reports of the Curia for the year 1500, he was the fifth richest member of the College of Cardinals, in terms of annual income. His influence grew further when his brother Alfonso married Lucrezia Borgia, daughter of Alexander VI, who granted him the title of archipresbyter of St. Peter's on 11 August 1501. The bride and bridegroom were escorted from Ferrara to Rome by a large company, headed by Cardinal Ippolito, which left the city on 9 December, and arrived in Rome on 23 December. Cardinal Ippolito was granted a palazzo for his use next to the Vatican Basilica. On 20 July 1502 Pope Alexander appointed Cardinal Ippolito Archbishop of Capua, though, since he still had not been consecrated a bishop, he could only be Administrator, enjoying the income from the diocese and the patronage that went with being the Archbishop, but unable to carry out any episcopal functions. But since Capua had been besieged and sacked by a French army under Cesare Borgia in 1501, there cannot have been much of an immediate gain in income.

It was not a safe time to be a cardinal. In April 1502, King Louis XII sent a French army, under the command of Louis d'Armagnac, Duke of Nemours, to invade Apulia. In his service was Cesare Borgia, Duke of the Romagna and Lord of Piombino, the Pope's son, who had commanded French troops in 1501 at the siege of Naples and the siege of Capua. Many rulers in Italy preferred to deal with the French rather than the Spanish, who had been favored for a decade. On 21 June 1502 Pope Alexander took the extraordinary step of sending a cardinal and one of his secretaries to Savona to attempt to kidnap and bring to Rome Cardinal Giuliano della Rovere, a consistent supporter of the French cause. The trick failed. On 12 July Cardinal Orsini sought an audience with Pope Alexander to get permission to go to Milan to negotiate with King Louis XII. When he was refused the audience, he left Rome anyway and headed for Milan. When he came back to Rome, Orsini was arrested and sent to the Castel S. Angelo, where he died on 22 February 1503. Cardinal d'Este remained in Rome, though his relations with Pope Alexander were said in the first week of November 1502 to have deteriorated due to Duke Ercole's failure to send aid to the Pope. It was reported to Venice on 24 November that the Cardinal's maestro di casa and three other persons had come from Rome in disguise; one was said to have been the Cardinal, because he was in disaccord with the Pope. On 15 February 1503, after he had participated in the day's papal Consistory, Ippolito was compelled to flee from the wrath of Cesare Borgia, with whose sister-in-law both Este and Borgia were engaged in illicit affairs. Fortunately, Alexander VI died on 18 August. Cardinal Ippolito was not able to return to Rome until 28 October, and then with a broken leg from a fall from his horse, because of which he had been absent from the Conclave of 16–22 September 1503.

While Cardinal Ippolito was recuperating, one of his old friends was engaged in an operation against his interests. Cardinal Tamás Bakócz, Archbishop of Esztergom and Chancellor of Hungary (on account of which he did not attend the conclaves), wrote a letter to the Signoria of Venice, which Marino Sanuto saw on 23 November 1503. In his letter, which was purely concerned with benefices, he wanted the Signoria to get Cardinal d'Este to resign the Bishopric of Eger. The Doge replied that they had already tried to do so, and that he did not want to acquiesce. Bakócz certainly had a point in canon law, in that Cardinal Ippolito had been bishop for nearly sixteen years and was not yet consecrated, and yet there seems to be a case of ingratitude, since Bakócz, who had been educated at Bologna and Ferrara, had once been Cardinal d'Este's private secretary.

=== Julius II ===
After Alexander's death, on 8 October 1503 Pius III appointed Cardinal Ippolito bishop of Ferrara. When Pius III died on 18 October, d'Este was able to participate in the second Conclave of 1503, at which Cardinal Giuliano della Rovere was elected Pope Julius II on 1 November. One of Cardinal Ippolito's conclavists was his half-brother Giulio d'Este. Julius' pro-French policies ought to have made life easier for Ferrara, but his determination to humble the power of Milan and Venice placed Ferrara in the exact center of what would become a major war. The Cardinal of Ferrara, therefore, endured a rough and dangerous relationship with Pope Julius.

After the Conclave and the Coronation (26 November), Cardinal Ippolito was reported to be ill and did not attend the papal ceremonies of taking possession of his cathedral church of Saint John Lateran on 5 December 1503. He returned to Ferrara on 10 December 1503, and he was still in Ferrara when he was present at his father's deathbed on 15 June 1505. In 1506 a plot was discovered in Ferrara against the new duke, Alfonso, and his brother Cardinal Ippolito. The leaders, their brother Ferrante and their half-brother Giulio, were tried in September and sentenced to death. The sentence, however, was commuted to life imprisonment. Ferrante died in prison thirty-four years later, and Giulio was finally released after fifty-three years.

In 1507 Cardinal d'Este was named Bishop of Modena, but, still unconsecrated, he could only act as Administrator. Ippolito, however, was again at odds with Pius' successor Julius II (della Rovere), and in 1507 he left the Curia. On 24 May he was in Milan and took part in the formal reception of King Louis XII of France, along with Cardinals Georges d'Amboise, Clermont de Castelnau, Pallavicini, Caretto, San Severino, and Trivulzio. As Archbishop of Milan, he was only doing his duty, and Pope Julius had to suppress his annoyance. In September 1507, Duke Alfonso of Ferrara happened to be in Rome on his way to Naples, and, according to a report of 22 September, the Pope had named Cardinal Ippolito to the post of Apostolic Legate in Bologna. But in the following year Julius praised him for his conduct in the Bentivoglio plot.

In June 1509 Cardinal d'Este joined the King of France in his camp near Brescia. The King had sent the Duke of Ferrara a demand for 100,000 ducats for his campaign. The Cardinal successfully led a military contingent to regain the Polesine territories that the Este had lost in the war with Venice in 1484, winning the decisive battle of Polesella. On 27 July the pope recalled him to Rome, but, feeling his life was unsafe, trapped as he was between King and Pope, Ippolito fled to Hungary.

In May 1510, upon the death of Cardinal Giuliano Cesarini, the office of Abbot Commendatory of the Abbazia di Nonantola (diocese of Modena) became vacant. Cardinal Ippolito immediately rushed to the monastery and browbeat the six electors into electing him to the position. Pope Julius objected, and Cardinal Ippolito had to send his secretary, Ludovico Ariosto, to Rome to explain the circumstances to the Pope. The cardinal held the abbey until his death.

On 16 May 1511, the summons of the Pope to appear at the schismatic Council of Pisa was signed by four cardinals, led by Bernardino Carvajal, Bishop of Sabina; they claimed to have the mandates of five other cardinals, including Cardinal d'Este, but several of them denied that they were involved and protested vehemently at the misuse of their names. D'Este's brother Alfonso later convinced him to disassociate himself from the schism, and Pope Julius authorized him to return to Ferrara.

=== Leo X ===
In 1513 Ippolito moved again to Hungary but, when in his absence Cardinal Giovanni de' Medici was elected pope, taking the name Leo X, the Cardinal returned again to his native city. On 22 April 1514 he and his family were pardoned for all their past anti-papal acts.

From October 1517 to the Spring of 1520, Cardinal d'Este visited Hungary, Poland and Germany. On 7 April 1518, the Cardinal left Eger to go to Cracow for the marriage of King Sigismund and Bona, the daughter of Gian Galeazzo Sforza, who also happened to be a niece of the Emperor Maximilian. He was accompanied by the two Provosts and the entire body of Canons of the Cathedral of Eger. They stayed an entire month. In the winter and spring of 1519 he became involved in a struggle over the office of Count Palatine of Hungary, on the death of Emeric Perényi. Cardinal d'Este favored the candidacy of the Count of Temes, while Cardinal Bakócz favored that of John Zápolya, the Voivode of Transylvania. The party favored by d'Este prevailed.

On 12 January 1519 the Emperor Maximilian I died. Competition to be his successor developed between King Francis I of France, Frederick III, Elector of Saxony, Duke Charles of Burgundy, and King Henry VIII of England. Agents of each of the candidates descended upon Buda, to speak with Vladislaus, who was one of the Electors as King of Bohemia. Cardinal d'Este was consulted by all parties, and he also sent his representative, Celio Calcagnini, to the meeting of the Diet at Frankfurt. On 28 June 1519 Charles Duke of Burgundy became the Emperor Charles V.

On 20 May 1519 he resigned the archbishopric of Milan, and his nephew Ippolito II d'Este, the son of Lucrezia Borgia, Duchess of Ferrara, was appointed his successor in Consistory by Pope Leo X.

He returned home to Ferrara on Monday of Holy Week, 2 April 1520, entered the city on Holy Saturday, and celebrated the Easter festival in his cathedral.

On Friday 10 August the Cardinal took a long walk of some five miles (eight km) to a property of his at Baura, east of Ferrara. On Sunday he took a walk to his property at Sabioncello, a distance of twelve miles, but he felt troubled the whole day; he was advised to return to Ferrara and avoid the heat. The Duke made the Castel Nuovo on the Po available to Ippolito, where he remained ill until Friday, 31 August, when he got out of bed in the morning, feeling in much better spirits. He travelled to Piscalo (Pescara) for the sake of the fish, since he did not wish to eat meat, presumably due to the Friday fast. He asked for grilled fish and some Vernaccia, which his doctor permitted and which made him feel better. But in the evening his discomfort returned and he began to run a fever. On Saturday, 1 September, he was so much worse that the Duke summoned all his doctors, who indeed found the Cardinal much worse, and agreed to administer a dose of medicine at the seventh hour, if the fever had not gone down. But at that time it was impossible to administer medicine because Ippolito was already in extremis. Cardinal d'Este was reported to be ill by the Ferrarese Ambassador in Venice, Jacomo Tebaldo, who said he had had a letter of 2 September 1520 which stated that the Cardinal was seriously ill and in danger of death. He died in Ferrara on 3 September 1520, and was buried in the Sacristy of the Cathedral of Ferrara on the evening of his death.

His estate, inherited by his brother Alfonso I, amounted to some 200,000 ducati. In Rome, on 5 September, Pope Leo X was trying to divide up the late Cardinal's benefices, in the midst of three attacks of tertian fever. He made the announcement of the various distributions in the Consistory of 10 September.

Ippolito had two illegitimate children.

The Cardinal was a famous patron of the arts, as were other members of his family. Among his protegés were the poet Ludovico Ariosto and architect Biagio Rossetti. He also patronized the Flemish musician Adrien Willaert.

== See also ==
- Giulio d'Este
- Angela Borgia
- Alfonso I d'Este
- Castello Estense

== Bibliography ==
- Banfi, F. (1938). "Il cardinale Ippolito d'Este nella vita politica d'Ungheria," in: L'Europa orientale, XVIII (1938), pp. 61–77.
- Byatt, Lucy (1993), "ESTE, Ippolito d'". Dizionario Biografico degli Italiani Volume 43 (1993) (in Italian)
- Cardella, Lorenzo (1793). Memorie storiche de'cardinali della santa Romana chiesa (in Italian). Vol. Tomo Terzo. Roma: Pagliarini. pp. 258–262.
- Gerevich, Tiberio (1921). "Ippolito d'Este, Arcivescovo di Strigonio," Corvina Vol. 1 (1921), pp. 48–52. (in Italian)
- Hollingworth, Mary (2021). Conclave 1559: Ippolito d'Este and the Papal Election of 1559 (Hardcover). New York: Apollo. ISBN 978-1800244733.
- Hollingworth, Mary (2000). "Ippolito d'Este: A Cardinal and his Household in Rome and Ferrara in 1566". The Court Historian. 5 (2). London: Taylor & Francis: 105–126. doi:10.1179/cou.2000.5.2.002. S2CID 162281410.
- Kun Enikő: Estei Hippolit, Magyarország legfiatalabb érseke, National Geographic Magazine, 2008. február 7.
- Kovács Péter: Estei Hippolit püspök egri számadáskönyvei, 1500–1508, kandidátusi/PHD disszertáció, a Magyar Tudományos Akadémia Történettudományi Intézete, 1992. [1], letéve a Heves Megyei Levéltárban.
- Marcora, C. (1958), "Il cardinale Ippolito I d'Este," in Memorie Storiche della diocesi di Milano V, Milano 1958, pp. 325–520.
- Monferrato de'Calcagnini, Giovanni Girolamo (1843). Vita del cardinale Ippolito I. d'Este scritta da un anonimo, con annotazioni (in Italian). Milan: Ripamonti-Carpano.
