= List of Modenese consorts =

== Lady of Modena ==
=== House of Este, 1288–1452 ===
Picture	Name	Father	Birth	Marriage	Became Consort	Ceased to be Consort	Death	Spouse
	Constanza della Scala	Alberto I della Scala, Lord of Verona (Scaliger)	-	28 July 1289		20 February 1293 husband's death	after 27 April 1306	Obizzo II
	Giovanna Orsini	Bertoldo Orsini (Orsini)	-	1282	20 February 1293 husband's accession	1302/04		Azzo VIII
	Beatrice of Anjou	Charles II of Naples (Anjou)	1295	April 1305		31 January 1308 husband's death	1335	Azzo VIII
	Alda Rangoni	Tobia Rangoni (Rangoni)	-	1289	20 February 1293 husband's accession	September 1321		Aldobrandino II
	Orsina Orsini	Bertoldo Orsini (Orsini)	-	-	23 August 1312 husband's accession	20 February 1293 husband's death	-	Francesco
	Gigliola da Carrara	Francesco II da Carrara, Lord of Padua (Carraresi)	1379/82	June 1397		1416		Niccolò III
	Parisina Malatesta	Andrea Malatesta, Lord of Cesena (Malatesta)	1404	1418		21 May 1425		Niccolò III
	Ricciarda of Saluzzo	Thomas III, Margrave of Saluzzo (Aleramici)	1410	1429/31		26 December 1441 husband's death	16 August 1474	Niccolò III
	Margherita Gonzaga	Gianfrancesco I Gonzaga, Marquis of Mantua (Gonzaga)	1418	January 1435	26 December 1441 husband's accession	3 July 1439		Leonello d'Este
	Maria of Aragon	Alfonso V of Aragon (Trastámara)	1425	13 April/20 May 1444		9 December 1449		Leonello d'Este

== Duchess of Modena ==
=== House of Este, 1452–1796 ===
Picture	Name	Father	Birth	Marriage	Became Duchess	Ceased to be Duchess	Death	Spouse
	Eleanor of Naples	Ferdinand I of Naples (Trastámara)	22 June 1450	3 July 1473		11 October 1493		Ercole I
	Lucrezia Borgia	Rodrigo Borgia, Pope Alexander VI (Borgia)	18 April 1480	2 February 1502	15 June 1505 husband's accession	24 June 1519		Alfonso I
	Laura Dianti	Francesco Boccacci Dianti (Dianti)	1480	after 1519		31 October 1534 husband's death	25 June 1573	Alfonso I
	Renée of France	Louis XII of France (Valois-Orléans)	25 October 1510	28 June 1528	31 October 1534 husband's accession	3 October 1559 husband's death	12 June 1575	Ercole II
	Lucrezia de' Medici	Cosimo I de' Medici, Grand Duke of Tuscany (Medici)	7 June 1545	3 July 1558	3 October 1559 husband's accession	21 April 1562		Alfonso II
	Barbara of Austria	Ferdinand I, Holy Roman Emperor (Habsburg)	30 April 1539	5 December 1565		19 September 1572		Alfonso II
	Margherita Gonzaga	Guglielmo X Gonzaga, Duke of Mantua (Gonzaga)	27 May 1564	24 February 1579		27 October 1597 husband's death	6 January 1618	Alfonso II
	Virginia de' Medici	Cosimo I de' Medici, Grand Duke of Tuscany (Medici)	29 May 1568	6 February 1586	27 October 1597 husband's accession	15 January 1615		Cesare
	Maria Caterina Farnese	Ranuccio I Farnese, Duke of Parma (Farnese)	18 February 1615	11 January 1631		25 June 1646		Francesco I
	Vittoria Farnese	Ranuccio I Farnese, Duke of Parma (Farnese)	29 April 1618	12 February 1648		10 August 1649		Francesco I
	Lucrezia Barberini	Taddeo Barberini, Prince of Palestina (Barberini)	24 October 1628	14 October 1654		14 October 1658 husband's death	24 August 1699	Francesco I
	Laura Martinozzi	Girolamo Martinozzi (Martinozzi)	27 May 1639	27 May 1655	14 October 1658 husband's accession	16 July 1662 husband's death	19 July 1687	Alfonso IV
Image needing translation	Margherita Maria Farnese	Ranuccio II Farnese, Duke of Parma (Farnese)	24 November 1664	14 July 1692		6 September 1694 husband's death	17 June 1718	Francesco II
	Charlotte Felicitas of Brunswick-Lüneburg	John Frederick, Duke of Brunswick-Lüneburg (Brunswick-Lüneburg)	8 March 1671	11 February 1696		29 September 1710		Rainaldo III
	Charlotte Aglaé d'Orléans	Philippe II, Duke of Orléans (Orléans)	20 October 1700	21 June 1720	26 October 1737 husband's accession	19 January 1761		Francesco III
	Maria Teresa Cybo-Malaspina, Duchess of Massa	Alderano I Cybo-Malaspina, Duke of Massa (Cybo Malaspina)	29 June 1725	16 April 1741	22 February 1780 husband's accession	29 December 1790		Ercole III

=== House of Austria-Este, 1814–1859 ===
Picture	Name	Father	Birth	Marriage	Became Duchess	Ceased to be Duchess	Death	Spouse
	Maria Beatrice of Savoy	Victor Emmanuel I of Sardinia (Savoy)	6 December 1792	20 June 1812	1814 husband's accession	15 September 1840		Francis IV
	Adelgunde of Bavaria	Louis I of Bavaria (Wittelsbach)	19 March 1823	20 March 1842	21 January 1846 husband's accession	11 June 1859; Conquest by Sardinia	28 January 1914	Francis V
