= List of Ferrarese consorts =

== Lady of Ferrara ==
=== House of Este, 1187–1264 ===
Picture	Name	Father	Birth	Marriage	Became Consort	Ceased to be Consort	Death	Spouse
	Sophia da Landinara	-	-	-	1187 granted title	25 December 1193 husband's accession	-	Obizzo I
	Sophie of Maurienne	Umberto III, Count of Savoy (Savoy)	1167/72	before 1192	25 December 1193 husband's accession	3 December 1202		Azzo VI
	Alix of Châtillon	Raynald of Châtillon (Châtillon)	-	22 February 1204		November 1212 husband's death	1235, or after	Azzo VI
	Mabilla Pallavicini	Guido Pallavicini, Marquis of Boudonitza (Pallavicini)	-	1238	1240 reconquest of Ferrara	17 February 1264 husband's death	February 1264	Azzo VII

== Marchioness of Ferrara ==
=== House of Este, 1264–1471 ===
Picture	Name	Father	Birth	Marriage	Became Consort	Ceased to be Consort	Death	Spouse
	Giacomina Fieschi	Niccolo Fieschi di Lavagna (Fieschi)	-	1263	17 February 1264 husband's accession	December 1287		Obizzo II
	Constanza della Scala	Alberto I della Scala, Lord of Verona (Scaliger)	-	28 July 1289		20 February 1293 husband's death	after 27 April 1306	Obizzo II
	Giovanna Orsini	Bertoldo Orsini (Orsini)	-	1282	20 February 1293 husband's accession	1302/04		Azzo VIII
	Beatrice of Anjou	Charles II of Naples (Anjou)	1295	April 1305		31 January 1308 husband's death	1335	Azzo VIII
	Alda Rangoni	Tobia Rangoni (Rangoni)	-	1289	20 February 1293 husband's accession	September 1321		Aldobrandino II
	Orsina Orsini	Bertoldo Orsini (Orsini)	-	-	23 August 1312 husband's accession	20 February 1293 husband's death	-	Francesco
	Gigliola da Carrara	Francesco II da Carrara, Lord of Padua (Carraresi)	1379/82	June 1397		1416		Niccolò III
	Parisina Malatesta	Andrea Malatesta, Lord of Cesena (Malatesta)	1404	1418		21 May 1425		Niccolò III
	Ricciarda of Saluzzo	Thomas III, Margrave of Saluzzo (Aleramici)	1410	1429/31		26 December 1441 husband's death	16 August 1474	Niccolò III
	Margherita Gonzaga	Gianfrancesco I Gonzaga, Marquis of Mantua (Gonzaga)	1418	January 1435	26 December 1441 husband's accession	3 July 1439		Leonello d'Este
	Maria of Aragon	Alfonso V of Aragon (Trastámara)	1425	13 April/20 May 1444		9 December 1449		Leonello d'Este

== Duchess of Ferrara ==
=== House of Este, 1471–1598 ===
Picture	Name	Father	Birth	Marriage	Became Duchess	Ceased to be Duchess	Death	Spouse
	Eleanor of Naples	Ferdinand I of Naples (Trastámara)	22 June 1450	3 July 1473		11 October 1493		Ercole I
	Lucrezia Borgia	Rodrigo Borgia, Pope Alexander VI (Borgia)	18 April 1480	2 February 1502	15 June 1505 husband's accession	24 June 1519		Alfonso I
	Laura Dianti	Francesco Boccacci Dianti (Dianti)	1480	after 1519		31 October 1534 husband's death	25 June 1573	Alfonso I
	Renée of France	Louis XII of France (Valois-Orléans)	25 October 1510	28 June 1528	31 October 1534 husband's accession	3 October 1559 husband's death	12 June 1575	Ercole II
	Lucrezia de' Medici	Cosimo I de' Medici, Grand Duke of Tuscany (Medici)	7 June 1545	3 July 1558	3 October 1559 husband's accession	21 April 1562		Alfonso II
	Barbara of Austria	Ferdinand I, Holy Roman Emperor (Habsburg)	30 April 1539	5 December 1565		19 September 1572		Alfonso II
	Margherita Gonzaga	Guglielmo X Gonzaga, Duke of Mantua (Gonzaga)	27 May 1564	24 February 1579		27 October 1597 husband's death	6 January 1618	Alfonso II
	Virginia de' Medici	Cosimo I de' Medici, Grand Duke of Tuscany (Medici)	29 May 1568	6 February 1586	27 October 1597 husband's accession	1598; Duchy confisicated by the Papal State	15 January 1615	Cesare
