= Parisina (disambiguation) =

Parisina Malatesta was the wife of Niccolò III d'Este, who beheaded her with her lover and stepson Ugo d'Este. Her tragic story has inspired writers and musicians:

- Parisina, an 1816 poem by Byron
- Parisina (Donizetti) by Donizetti
- Parisina (Mascagni), opera by Mascagni after Gabriele D'Annunzio's libretto
- 1878 opera by Tomás Giribaldi
- Tragedy by Antonio Somma
- La Parisina, a Mexican department store
