= Portrait of Leonello d'Este =

Painting by Pisanello

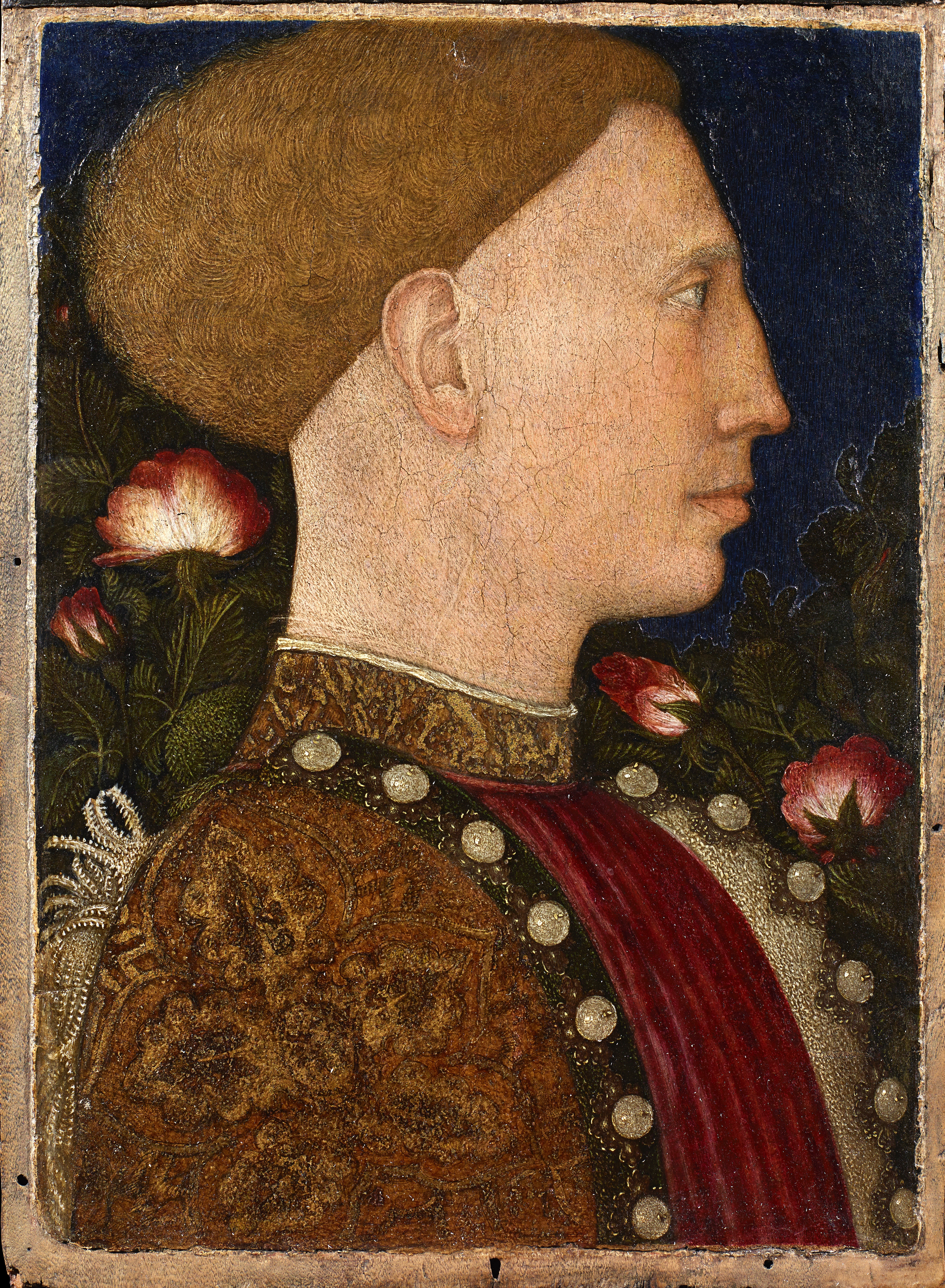
Portrait of Leonello d'Este (c. 1441) by Pisanello

Portrait of Lionello d'Este is a c.1441 tempera on panel painting by Pisanello, now in the Accademia Carrara in Bergamo. The work was recorded in the Costabili collection in Ferrara in 1841.

== Description ==
This colorful portrait in profile depicts the Marquis of Ferrara, Leonello d'Este, also known as "little lion."

== Origin ==
The work's origins may lie in an artistic contest between Pisanello and Jacopo Bellini in the first half of 1441, instigated by Niccolò III d'Este and with Niccolò's son Leonello offering himself as the subject. Bellini won according to the poet Ulisse degli Aleotti, but Pisanello still proved a success at the Este court, particularly with the six noted medallions commissioned from him by Leonello. His sister has also been painted.

== Bibliography (in Italian) ==
- AA.VV., L'opera completa di Pisanello, Rizzoli, Milano 1966
- Pierluigi De Vecchi ed Elda Cerchiari, I tempi dell'arte, volume 2, Bompiani, Milano 1999.
- Cecilia Frosinini e Maria Cristina Rodeschini, ed. (2016). Il ritratto di Leonello d'Este del Pisanello. Edifir, Opificio delle pietre dure. ISBN 978-88-7970-544-8.
