= Ugo d'Este =

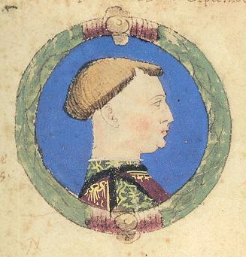
Ugo d'Este in the Genealogia dei principi d'Este (1470s)

Ugo d'Este (1405 – May 21, 1425), also known as Hugh Aldobrandino, was the son and planned successor of Niccolò III d'Este, Marquess of Ferrara. Ugo and his stepmother Parisina Malatesta had an affair and were both executed for it.

== Early life ==
Ugo was born to Niccolò III d'Este and his lover Stella de' Tolomei. Although he was illegitimate, he was to succeed his father as his eldest son.

His father never married his mother; but in 1418 married Parisina Malatesta, nearly twenty years his junior. At first, Ugo treated his stepmother coldly, who was almost his own age.

== Fatal relationship ==
In 1424, during a trip with his stepmother, they developed a sexual relationship that went on even when the two returned to Ferrara. Other sources report a different beginning to the affair: to escape the plague of 1423, they took refuge in the castello di Fossadalbero and there in the small castle their relationship was born.

A maid reported the affair to Niccolò, who spied on the lovers and had them imprisoned in the castle in Ferrara where they were sentenced to death by decapitation.

The tragic story has inspired several writers and musicians. The Renaissance Italian author Matteo Bandello wrote on it the novel 44 of the 1st part of his Novelle (Lucca, Busdrago, 1554); on this text the Spanish playwright Lope de Vega took inspiration to compose his most famous tragedy, El castigo sin venganza (Punishment Without Revenge, first published 1631); Edward Gibbon told this story in his Miscellaneous Works, and George Byron wrote the poem Parisina in 1816. A libretto by Felice Romani after the English poem was set to music by Gaetano Donizetti in 1833 as Parisina. Pietro Mascagni composed a tragic opera Parisina based on the lyric tragedy written by Gabriele D'Annunzio in 1912 as another adaptation of Byron's poem. There is also a lesser-known opera by Tomás Giribaldi (1878) and a tragedy by Antonio Somma.

After Ugo's death, his younger brother Leonello, also a son of Stella, succeeded his father. Another younger brother, Borso, also later became ruler of Ferrara.
