= Ricciarda of Saluzzo =

Italian noblewoman

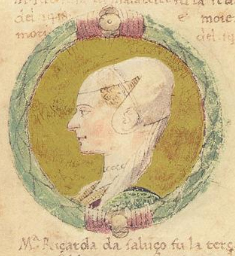
Ricciarda in the Genealogia dei principi d'Este (1470s)

Ricciardia, Marchioness of Saluzzo (1410 – 16 August 1474, Ferrara) was an Italian noblewoman. She was the daughter of Thomas III, Marquess of Saluzzo and his French wife Marguerite de Pierrepont, daughter of Ugo II de Pierrepont, count of Roncy and Braine.

In 1429 she married Niccolò III d'Este - she was his third wife, after Gigliola da Carrara and Parisina Malatesta. They had two children:

- Ercole (1431 – 1505), future duke of Ferrara;
- Sigismondo (1433 – 1507), lord of San Martino in Rio.

After Niccolò's death in 1441, the ten-year-old Ercole could in theory have succeeded his father as his eldest legitimate child. However, her father instead left the title to his illegitimate son Leonello, who exiled Ricciardia and her two children to Naples.

Leonello reigned for nine years, and then was succeeded by his brother Borso, who reigned for a further 21 years. However, in the meanwhile Ricciarda had forged alliances that meant that on Borso's death she succeeded in getting Ercole made duke of Ferrara.
