= Giovanni da Oriolo =

Italian painter

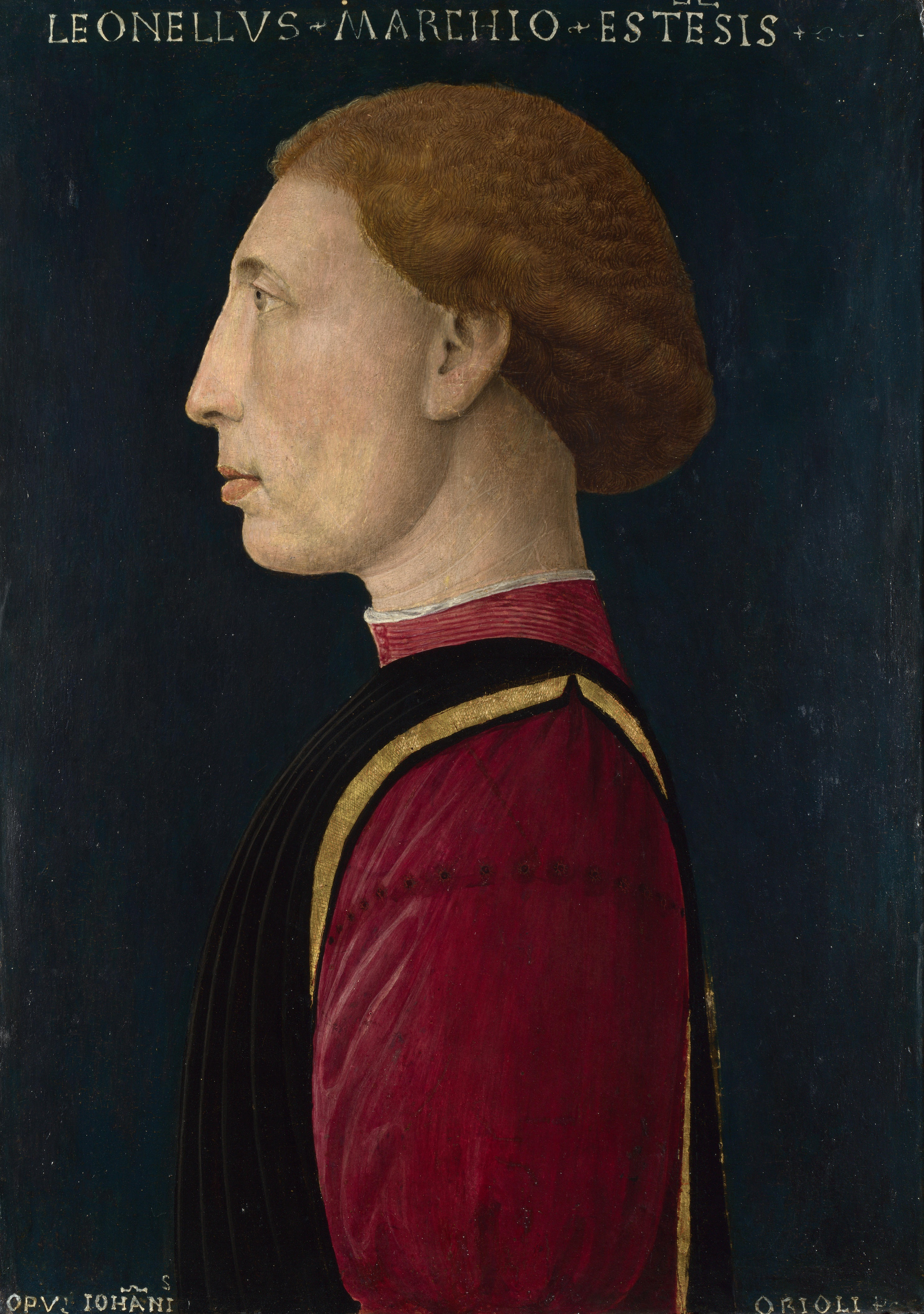
Leonello d'Este by Giovanni da Oriolo, National Gallery, 1447

Giovanni da Oriolo (active 1439; died by 1474) was an Italian painter of the Quattrocento, active in Northern Italy, including Faenza.

Only one confirmed painting by the artist is known: the profile portrait of Leonello d'Este, painted c. 1447, and now in the National Gallery of Art in London.
