= Stella de' Tolomei =

Italian courtier and royal mistress

Stella de’ Tolomei (died 1419) was an Italian noblewoman and the official mistress of Niccolò III d'Este, Marquis of Ferrara. Although never married to Niccolò, she held a prominent position at the Este court and bore him several children, including Leonello d'Este, who later became Marquis of Ferrara, and Borso d'Este, the first Duke of Ferrara. Her relationship with Niccolò granted her significant status and influence during her lifetime.

== Issue ==
Stella de’ Tolomei had several children with Niccolò III d’Este, many of whom were acknowledged and later legitimized:

- Ugo d'Este (1405–1425) – Executed by his father for allegedly engaging in an affair with his stepmother, Parisina Malatesta.
- Leonello d'Este (1407–1450) – Ruled as Marquis of Ferrara from 1441 to 1450; noted for his humanist education and patronage of the arts.
- Borso d'Este (1413–1471) – First Duke of Ferrara; known for his political consolidation and cultural patronage.

All three sons played significant roles in the Este dynasty, and both Leonello and Borso ascended to rulership despite their illegitimate birth.
