= Gigliola da Carrara =

Italian noblewoman

- Marchioness of Ferrara
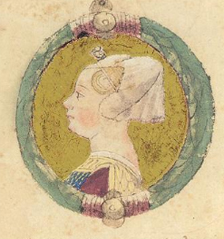
- Gigliola in the Genealogia dei principi d'Este (1470s)
- Reign: 1394 - 1416
- Born: 1379
- Died: 23 February 1416 (aged 36–37); Ferrara
- Noble family: Carraresi
- Spouse: Niccolò III d'Este
- Father: Francesco Novello da Carrara
- Mother: Taddea d'Este

Gigliola da Carrara (1379–23 February 1416) was the Marchioness of Ferrara, daughter of Francesco Novello da Carrara, lord of Padua, son of Francesco I da Carrara, and Taddea d'Este.

== Life ==
In 1386, marriage negotiations between Gigliola and a son of Albert II, Duke of Austria begun, with her dowry Feltre and Cividale de Belluna. The marriage never materialized however as Gian Galeazzo Visconti, Lord of Milan paid bribes to not make the betrothal go through.

Gigliola's father owing a debt of 10.000 ducats to Gian Galeazzo was proposed if he would marry his daughter to Gian Galeazzos illegitimate son Gabriele Visconti, the lord of Vincenza and Verona.

Visconti was most likely hoping to help strengthen his son's claims to the cities; since Gigliola through her maternal grandmother Verde della Scala she was a descendant of Mastino II della Scala, who had once been lord of Vincenza and Verona. Gian Galeazzo also promised to marry Gigliolas oldest brother Francesco to a daughter of his cousin Alvise Visconti.

The last legitimate heir, Canfrancesco had died mysteriously in 1392 (most likely poisoned).

Gigliolas father distrustful of Gian Galeazzos promises, betrothed her instead to her cousin Niccolò III d'Este, son of Alberto V d'Este (and enemy of Gian Galeazzo). The 13 years old Marchioness of Ferrara married, Niccolò III d'Este, in 1394. As a wedding gift the couple were gifted with the books De viris illustribus by Francesco Petrarca and De Mulieribus Claris by Giovanni Boccaccio. Gigliola's husband was frequently unfaithful to her and fathered many illegitimate children.

After the Battle of Casalecchio in 1402, her brother Francesco Giacomowho were captured by enemy forces and was being taken to Pavia and Gian Galeazzo Visconti. Francesco managed to escape to the territory of his brother-in-law and husband to Gigliola. She supplied him with a horse and guards to get him home safely to Padua.

In 1405 her father and two brothers were executed by Venetian officials after their capture during the War of Padua.

== Death ==
Gigliola died of the plague in 1416, leaving no children. Nicholò then married Parisina Malatesta whom he condemned to death for adultery with Ugo d'Este, and then Ricciarda di Saluzzo, with whom he had his children Ercole I d'Este and Sigismondo d'Este.
