= Parisina (Donizetti) =

Opera by Gaetano Donizetti

- Opera by Gaetano Donizetti
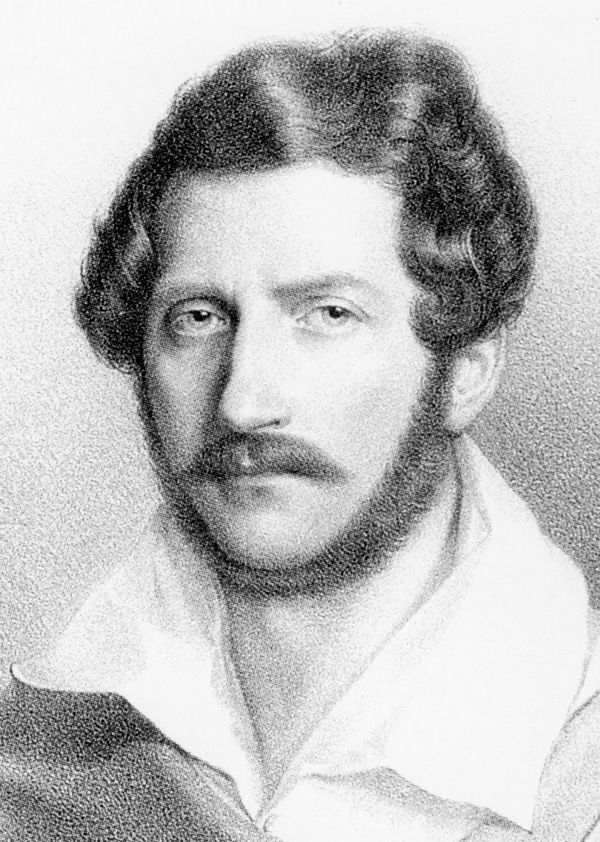
- Gaetano Donizetti c. 1835
- Librettist: Felice Romani
- Language: Italian
- Based on: Byron's Parisina
- Premiere: 17 March 1833; Teatro Valle, Rome

Parisina (also known as Parisina d'Este) is an opera (tragedia lirica), in three acts by Gaetano Donizetti. Felice Romani wrote the Italian libretto after Byron's 1816 poem Parisina.

The characters of Parisina and Duke Azzo in both Byron's poem and Donizetti's opera are very loosely based on the historical figures of Parisina Malatesta (the daughter of Andrea Malatesta) and Niccolò III d'Este.

Parisina premiered on 17 March 1833 at the Teatro della Pergola in Florence. A performance at the Teatro Argentina in Rome is the setting for a key scene in chapter 34 of the 1844 novel The Count of Monte Cristo by Alexandre Dumas.

== Roles ==
Role	Voice type	Premiere cast, 17 March 1833 (Conductor: – )
Parisina, wife of Duke Azzo	soprano	Carolina Ungher
Ugo, Parisina's lover	tenor	Gilbert Duprez
Duke Azzo	baritone	Domenico Cosselli
Ernesto, Duke Azzo's minister	bass	Carlo Ottolini Porto
Imelda, Parisina's handmaid	mezzo-soprano	Teresa Zappucci
Knights, handmaids, gondoliers, squires, soldiers

== Synopsis ==
Place: Ferrara

Time: the 15th century

=== Act 1 ===
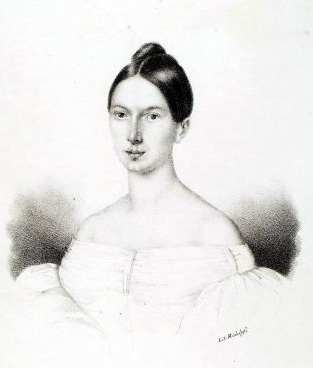
Carolina Ungher, who created the role of Parisina

In Duke Azzo's palace, Ernesto and other nobles await his arrival (È desto il duca?). Azzo appears and tells Ernesto about his fear that his wife, Parisina, has betrayed him for another man, as had his first wife, Matilde. When Azzo leaves, Ugo arrives. Ugo, who was raised by Ernesto, was once a favourite of Azzo but was later exiled. Ernesto is overcome by fear when he sees his foster son, knowing that his exile had not ended and Azzo was still angry at him. His fear worsens when Ugo reveals his love for Parisina to him.

Meanwhile, Parisina with her faithful Imelda and her other handmaids are resting in the garden. They hear knights arriving for the festivities, amongst whom is Ugo. When Parisina and Ugo are alone, she urges him to flee. They are interrupted by the arrival of the Duke. In a fury, he demands to know what Ugo is doing there. Parisina defends Ugo which only increases the Duke's anger (Il difende! E in sua difesa tanto adopra).

By the shores of the River Po. Azzo tells Ugo he may remain for the festivities, just as Ugo and his men are about to get on their boat. Parisina follows her husband and courtiers to the palace for the banquet (Vieni, vieni, e in sereno sembiante). Ernesto, Ugo, and Parisina are consumed by fear, while Azzo is consumed by his anger (Ma divoro nel cor tremante un timor/furor che non posso frenar).

=== Act 2 ===
In Parisina's room, Imelda and the other handmaids are talking about the banquet (Lieta era dessa). They express their joy at Parisina's happiness and Azzo's apparent tranquillity. Imelda, however, is fearful of what may happen. Parisina enters. She is tired and falls asleep. Her maids leave her alone, but Azzo enters the room to spy on her. In a dream, Parisina, believing that Ugo is in the room calls out to him and tells him they must flee together. Azzo shouts in fury waking Parisina, and he accuses her of being unfaithful. Parisina, now desperate, admits her love for Ugo. Azzo is about to kill her, but then holds back (Non pentirti, mi ferisci).

In another room in the palace and waiting for the banquet to begin, Ugo is troubled that Parisina has not yet appeared. Soldiers enter and order Ugo to follow them to the Duke who asks him if Parisina's confession is true. Azzo is about to condemn Ugo to death when Ernesto intervenes. He reveals that Ugo is Duke Azzo's son by his first marriage. His mother had entrusted him to Ernesto after she had been banished from the court. Azzo recognizes Ugo as his son, and appears to rescind the order for his death.

=== Act 3 ===
In the palace chapel a choir is heard (Muta, insensibile). Parisina prays that Ugo will be saved. Imelda arrives bringing a letter from Ugo, asking Parisina to escape with him. Parisina hesitates, but then decides to join him. Funeral music is heard. Azzo appears, blocks Parisina's way, and then shows her Ugo's corpse. Parisina is overcome by horror (Ugo è spento! A me si renda!) and falls dead.

== Recordings ==
Year	Cast (Azzo, Ugo, Parisina, Imelda)	Conductor, Opera house and orchestra	Label
1974	Louis Quilico, Jerome Pruett, Montserrat Caballé, Eleanor Bergquist	Eve Queler, Carnegie Hall, NY 1974	Myto MDCD 0002,2007
1997	Ramon De Andrès, Amedeo Moretti, Alexandrina Pendachanska, Daniela Barcellona	Emmanuel Plasson, Orchestra della Svizzera Italiana and Coro della Radio Televisione Svizzera Italiana	CD: Dynamic; Cat: CDS 277/1-2
2008	Dario Solari, José Bros, Carmen Giannattasio, Ann Taylor	David Parry, London Philharmonic Orchestra and Geoffrey Mitchell Choir	CD: Opera Rara; Cat: ORC 40
