= Margherita Gonzaga, Marquise of Ferrara =

Italian noblewoman

Margherita Gonzaga
- Marquise of Ferrara
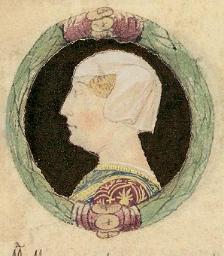
- Margherita in the Genealogia dei principi d'Este (1470s)
- Born: 1418; Mantua
- Died: 7 July 1439 (aged 20–21); Governolo
- Buried: Mantua
- Noble family: Gonzaga
- Spouse: Leonello d'Este, Marquis of Ferrara
- Issue: Niccolò d'Este (Niccolò di Leonello)
- Father: Gianfrancesco I Gonzaga, Marquess of Mantua
- Mother: Paola Malatesta

Margherita Gonzaga, Marquise of Ferrara (1418–1439) was a noblewoman of the House of Gonzaga, from Mantua in modern-day Italy. She was the daughter of Gianfrancesco I Gonzaga, Marquess of Mantua and Paola Malatesta. In 1435, she became the first wife of Leonello d'Este, Marquess of Ferrara, making her the Marquise of Ferrara and creating an alliance between the House of Gonzaga of Mantua and the House of Este of Ferrara. The artist Pisanello gave them a painting of Julius Caesar as a wedding gift. The couple had a son, Niccolò, who is also known as Niccolò di Leonello to avoid confusion with his grandfather, Niccolò III d'Este.
