= Tomás Giribaldi =

Uruguayan composer

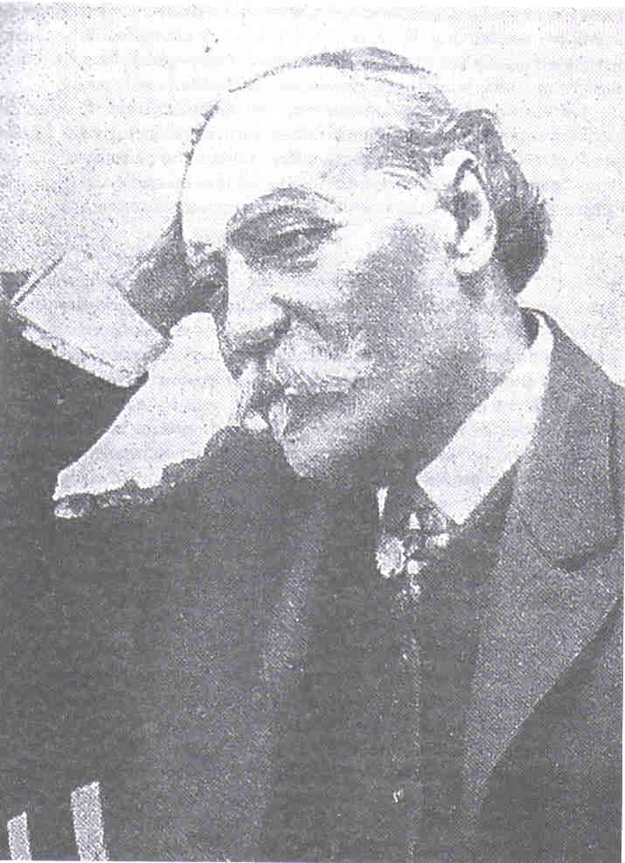
Portrait of Tomás Giribaldi

Tomás Giribaldi (c. 1847-April 11, 1930) was an Uruguayan composer. His opera La Parisina, premiered at the Solís Theatre in Montevideo on September 14, 1878, is considered the first Uruguayan national opera. It was composed in Italian, and set to a modified libretto by Felice Romani which had previously been used for Gaetano Donizetti's Parisina. Based upon its success, Giribaldi was sent to Italy for further study, but he had to return home before he could begin. He continued to compose operas, but never with the same success.
