= Borso d'Este =

Duke of Ferrara and Modena from 1452 to 1471

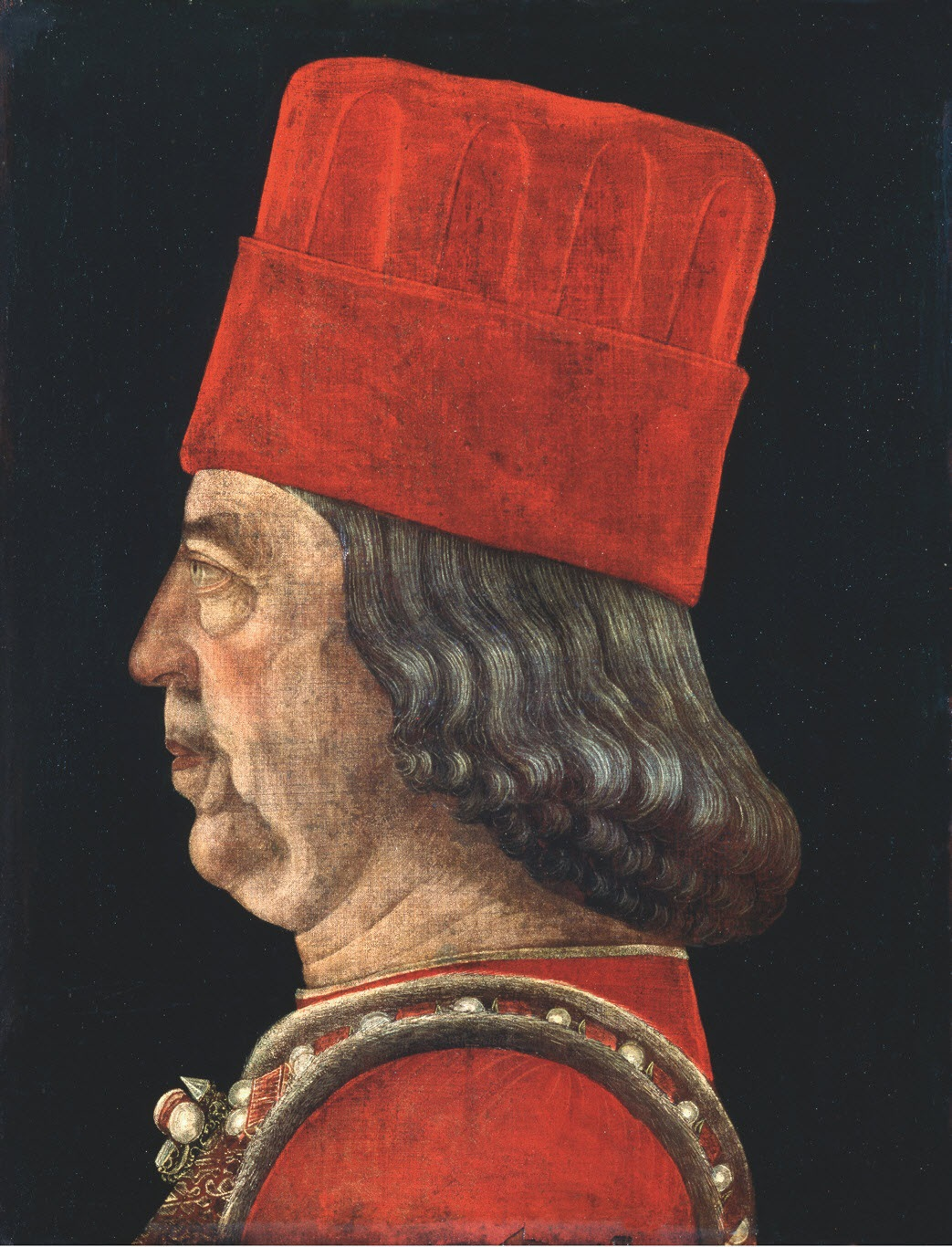
- Borso d'Este, attributed to Vicino da Ferrara, Pinacoteca of the Sforza Castle in Milan, Italy.

Duke of Ferrara, Modena and Reggio
- Reign: 1450 – 20 August 1471
- Predecessor: Lionello d'Este
- Successor: Ercole I d'Este
- Born: 1413; Ferrara, Marquisate of Ferrara
- Died: 20 August 1471 (aged 57); Ferrara, Duchy of Ferrara
- House: Este
- Father: Niccolò III d'Este
- Mother: Stella de' Tolomei (concubine)

Borso d'Este (1413 – 20 August 1471) was the first Duke of Ferrara and Modena, ruling from 1450 until his death. A member of the House of Este, he secured his titles from both Emperor Frederick III in 1452 and Pope Paul II in 1471, strengthening the political status of the Este state.

Borso was an illegitimate son of Niccolò III d'Este, Marquess of Ferrara, Modena, and Reggio, by his mistress Stella de' Tolomei. He is best known for his patronage of the arts and the lavish cultural life at his court in Ferrara. His most famous commission was the Bible of Borso d'Este, an illuminated manuscript regarded as a masterpiece of Renaissance book art. He supported the early Ferrarese School of painting and helped establish Ferrara as an important center of Renaissance culture in northern Italy.

== Reign ==
Borso succeeded his brother Leonello d'Este as marquess on 1 October 1450. On 18 May 1452 he received confirmation over his fiefs, as Duke of Modena and Reggio, by Emperor Frederick III. On 12 April 1471, in St. Peter's Basilica, he was also appointed as Duke of Ferrara by Pope Paul II.

Borso followed an expansionist policy for his state, and one of ennobling for his family. He was generally allied with the Republic of Venice, and enemy both to Francesco I Sforza and the Medici family. These rivalries led to the indecisive Battle of Molinella. He was in general appreciated by his subjects. One cause of grievance was his project to build a mountain from scratch in 1471 – a folly he was later forced to abandon.

== Patron of culture ==
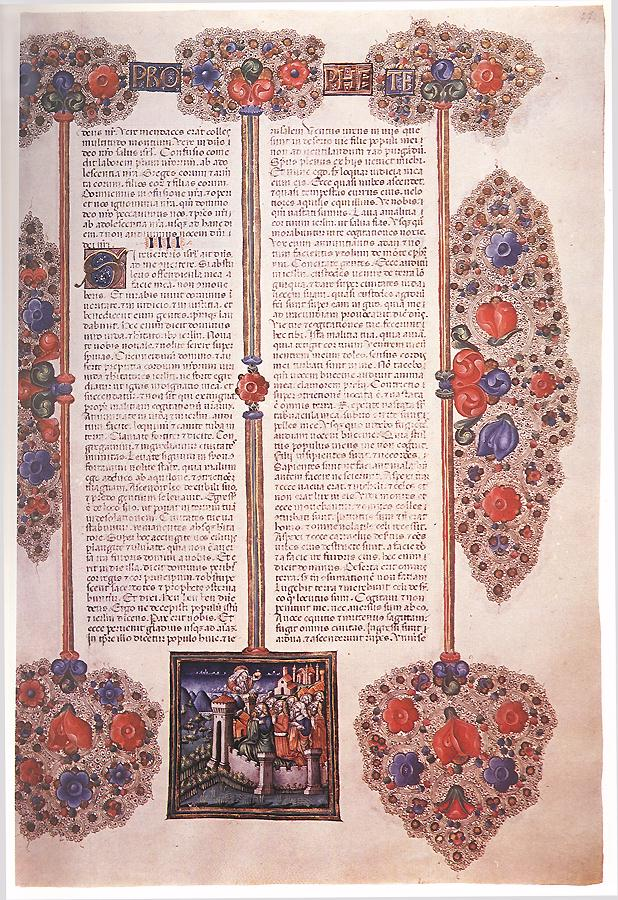
A page of Borso d'Este's Bible.

Borso's court was the center of the so-called Ferrarese school of painting, whose members include Francesco del Cossa, Ercole dei Roberti and Cosimo Tura. Their most important commission during Borso's rule were the frescoes in the Palazzo Schifanoia and the Borso D'Este Bible.

A man of little education (unlike his brother Leonello), he had a pragmatic view of the arts as a powerful propaganda tool to promote his political ambitions by projecting an image of personal magnificence. He liked to portray himself as an ideal ruler, as for example in the frescoes in Palazzo Schifanoia. His traditional image as a magnanimous patron of arts, as later proclaimed in Ludovico Ariosto's poem Orlando Furioso, is also an idealized representation. While spending extravagantly on culture and spectacle to promote his political image, he was far from generous with the artists he patronized, whom he did not consider worthy of any special consideration. A notorious example of this attitude was his miserly treatment of Cossa, who consequently abandoned Ferrara for Bologna. His personal Bible (commissioned in 1455) is one of the most magnificent illuminated manuscripts of Renaissance Italy and a fabulously costly work of art; (Note: Production of the Bible cost exactly twice the amount paid to Domenico Ghirlandaio for the entire Tornabuoni Chapel in Santa Maria Novella in Florence. The illumination work alone cost five thousand lire, which at the time represented a colossal sum of money.) however, its principal illuminator, Taddeo Crivelli, appears to have pawned parts of other manuscripts he was working on to alleviate financial instability.

Borso never married and left no heirs. His successor was his half-brother Ercole I d'Este.

== Sources ==
- Bartlett, Kenneth R. (2013). A Short History of the Italian Renaissance. University of Toronto Press. ISBN 978-1-4426-0014-0.
- Dean, Trevor (1985). "Lords, Vassals and Clients in Renaissance Ferrara". The English Historical Review. 100 (394 (Jan.)): 106–119.
- Pius II (2003). Meserve, Margaret; Simonetta, Marcello (eds.). Commentaries, vol. I. Cambridge: Harvard University Press. p. 121.

Preceded by Leonello	Duke of Ferrara, Modena and Reggio (Marquess until 1452); 1450–1471	Succeeded by Ercole I
