= Albert V d'Este =

Marquis of Ferrara and Modena

Alberto V d'Este
- Marquis of Ferrara
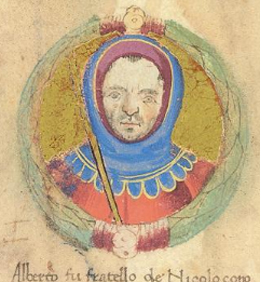
- Alberto V depicted in the Genealogia dei principi d'Este (1470s)
- Born: 27 February 1347
- Died: 30 July 1393 (aged 46)
- Noble family: House of Este
- Spouses: Giovanna de' Roberti; Isotta Albaresani
- Issue: Niccolò III d'Este (illeg.)
- Father: Obizzo III d'Este
- Mother: Jacopa Pepoli

Albert (V) d'Este (27 February 1347 – 30 July 1393) was Lord of Ferrara and Modena from 1388 until his death.

He was associated in the lordship of the House of Este by his brother Niccolò in 1361, becoming the sole ruler of Ferrara and Modena after the latter's death in 1388. He was the son of Obizzo III d'Este, who had ruled in Ferrara from 1317 to 1352.

Albert founded the University of Ferrara in 1391. In the same year he married Giovanna de' Roberti (d. 1393). After her death, Albert married his mistress Isotta Albaresani. They had Niccolò III d'Este. He was succeeded by his legitimated son Niccolò (III).

== Sources ==
- Bestor, Jane Fair (1996). "Bastardy and Legitimacy in the Formation of a Regional State in Italy: The Estense Succession". Comparative Studies in Society and History. 38 (3 (Jul.)): 549–585.
- Brown, Jason Aaron; Cossar, Roisin (2025). Telling Tales: Clerics, Concubines, and an Inquisitor in Late Medieval Ferrara: A Primary Source Study. University of Toronto Press. ISBN 978-1487560676.
- Commire, Anne; Klezmer, Deborah, eds. (2000). "Este, Isotta d'". Women in World History: A Biographical Encyclopedia. Vol. 5: Ead-Fur. Yorkin Publications. ISBN 0-7876-4064-6.
- Saletti, Beatrice (2020). "Loyalty to the church, loyalty to the duke: conflicts of power in late medieval Ferrara". In Fuller, Amy; McCallum, John; Hodgson, Natasha; Morton, Nicholas (eds.). Religion and Conflict in Medieval and Early Modern Worlds: Identities, Communities and Authorities. Taylor & Francis. pp. 223–238. ISBN 9780429836008.

Albert V d'Este House of Este Born: 27 February 1347 Died: 30 July 1393
Preceded by Niccolò II	Marquess of Ferrara; 1361–1393	Succeeded by Niccolò III
