= Francesco Novello da Carrara =

Lord of Padua from 1388 (1359–1406)

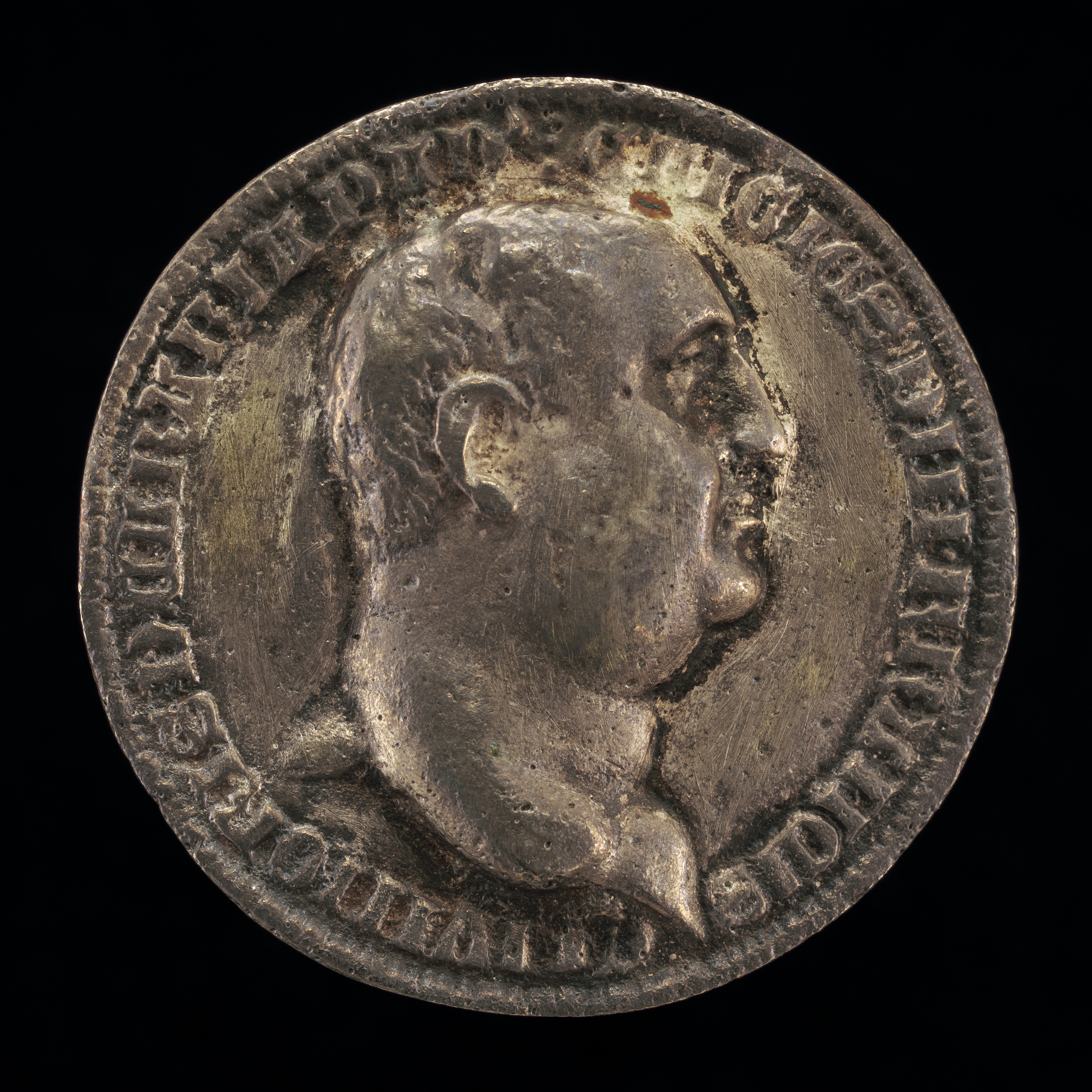
- Medal with the bust of Francesco Novello, 1390

Lord of Padua
- Reign: 6 October 1393 - 16 January 1406
- Predecessor: Francesco I da Carrara
- Successor: None (annexed by Venice)
- Born: 19 May 1359; Padua
- Died: 16 January 1406 (aged 46)
- Noble family: Carraresi
- Spouse: Taddea d’Este
- Father: Francesco I da Carrara
- Mother: Fina Buzzaccarini

Francesco II da Carrara (19 May 1359 – 16 January 1406), known as Francesco il Novello ('Francesco the Younger'), was Lord of Padua after his father, Francesco I il Vecchio, renounced the lordship on 29 June 1388; he was a member of the family of Carraresi. He married Taddea, daughter of Niccolò II d'Este, Lord of Modena.

He fought in the Battle of Castagnaro (1387) for Padua.

He was executed by Venetian officials after his capture during the war between Venice and Padua (see War of Padua). Burckhardt writes: "when the last Carrara could no longer defend the walls and gates of the plague-stricken Padua, hemmed in on all sides by the Venetians, the soldiers of the guard heard him cry to the devil 'to come and kill him.'" His sons Francesco and Giacomo who had also been captured were executed the following day. In Francesco's extensive familia, or ducal household, the painter Cennino Cennini imbibed the humanist culture expressed in his celebrated Libro dell'arte.

== Family ==
Francesco II had several legitimate children:

- Francesco III, was strangled a few days after his father. Married Alda Gonzaga, daughter of Francesco I Gonzaga and Agnese Visconti.
- Jacopo, taken prisoner after the surrender of Verona, strangled a few days after his father. Married to Costanza da Varano.
- Ubertino
- Marsilio
- Nicolò, died in childhood
- Gigliola da Carrara
- Valpurga, abbess of Saint Agatha in Padua

He also had a number of illegitimate offspring:

- Stefano
- Gionata
- Milone
- Agnese, married Ognibene da Mantova

== Sources ==
- Ganguzza Billanovich, Maria Chiara (1977). "CARRARA, Francesco da, il Novello". Dizionario Biografico degli Italiani (in Italian). Vol. 20: Carducci–Carusi. Rome: Institute of the Italian Encyclopaedia. ISBN 978-88-12-00032-6.
- Kohl, Benjamin G. (1998). Padua under the Carrara, 1318–1405. Baltimore and London: Johns Hopkins University Press. ISBN 0-8018-5703-1.

Preceded by Francesco I	Lord of Padua; 1388–1405	Venetian conquest
