= Parisina Malatesta =

Italian marchioness

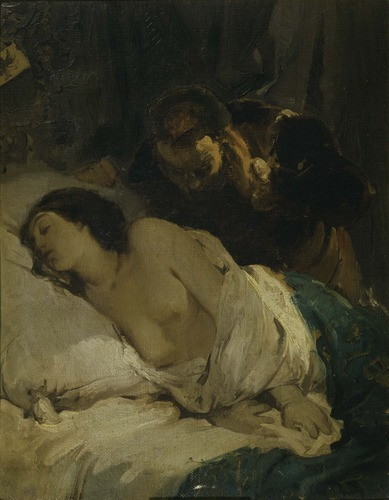
Giuseppe Bertini, Parisina, 1854

Laura Malatesta (1404 – 21 May 1425), better known as Parisina Malatesta, was an Italian marchioness. She was the daughter of Andrea Malatesta, lord of Cesena, and his second wife, Lucrezia Ordelaffi. She had an affair with her illegitimate stepson, Ugo d'Este, and both were beheaded by her husband, Marquis Niccolò III d'Este of Ferrara.

Edward Gibbon acquainted English readers with the story in 1796, after which Lord Byron wrote the poem Parisina, which was followed by operas of the same name by Donizetti and Mascagni.

== Biography ==
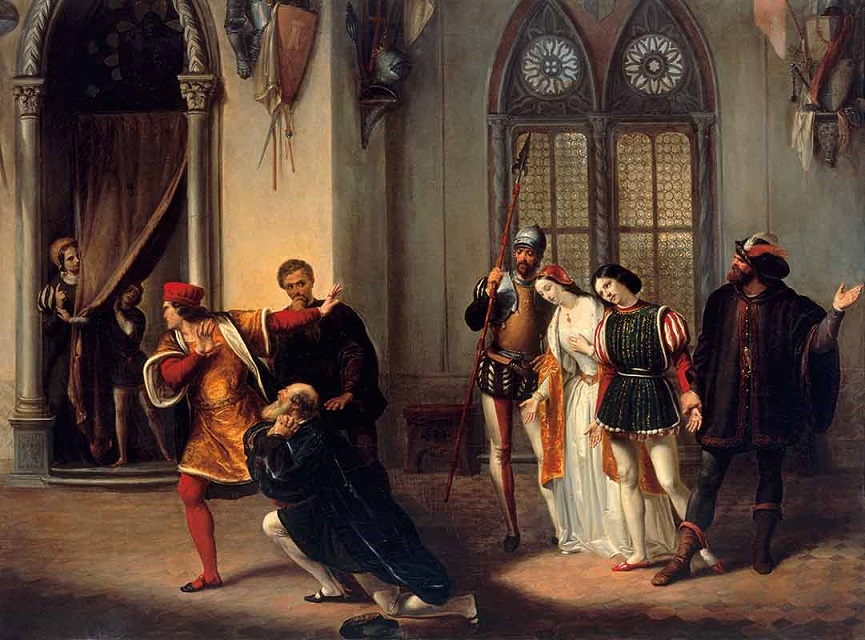
Girolamo Domenichini, La condanna di Ugo e Parisina (1836), Museo dell'Ottocento, Ferrara.

Parisina was only a few days old when her mother was poisoned by her father, Cecco Ordelaffi. She grew up in the court of her uncle, Carlo Malatesta, in Rimini.

In 1418 in Ravenna, at the age of 13, she married Niccolò III d'Este, Marquis of Ferrara, whose first wife Gigliola da Carrara had died a few years before, and moved to Ferrara, which was ravaged by plague. She resided in the tower of Rigobello, in rooms under the library, and also in the Delizia di Consandolo, built by Niccolò.

In 1419 she gave birth to twin daughters, and in 1421 to a son, who lived only a few months.

According to some sources, during a trip in 1424 to visit her family, Parisina was accompanied, according to her husband's wishes, by Ugo d'Este, illegitimate son of Niccolò by his lover, Stella de' Tolomei. The two young people got to know each other in Ravenna and became lovers. The relationship continued secretly after they returned to Ferrara. They met in the delizie di Belfiore, Fossadalbero e Quartesana.

Other sources report that to escape the plague of 1423 she took refuge in the castello di Fossadalbero accompanied by her stepson, and it was there that relationship started.

Putting the couple under the surveillance of one of her maids, Niccolò discovered the affair. He imprisoned his wife and son in the castle's dungeon, and both were beheaded.

== In culture ==
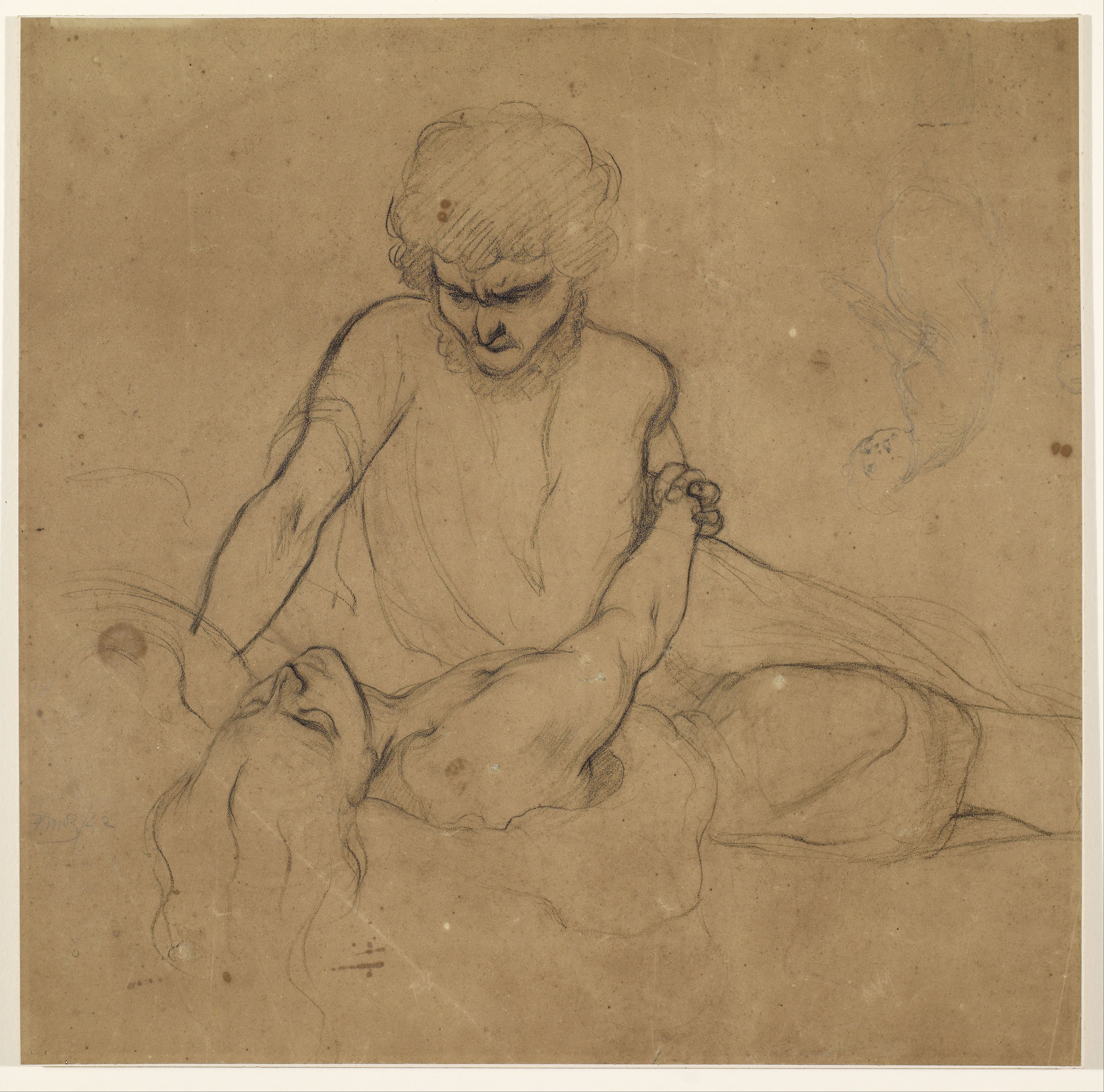
Azo and the sleeping Parisina, study for a lost painting by Ford Madox Brown.

Her tragic story has inspired writers, musicians, and painters. The Renaissance Italian author Matteo Bandello wrote the novel Ugo and Parisina.

Edward Gibbon briefly told the story in his Miscellaneous Works in 1796:

By the testimony of a maid, and his own observation, the Marquis of Este discovered the incestuous love of his wife Parisina, and Hugo his bastard son, a beautiful and valiant youth. They were beheaded in the castle, by the sentence of a father and a husband, who published his shame, and survived the execution. He was unfortunate, if they were guilty : if they were innocent, he was still more unfortunate : nor is there any possible situation in which I can sincerely approve the last act of the injustice of a parent.

Lord Byron published the 586-line poem Parisina in 1816. In Byron's poem, Azo (his version of Niccolò) learns of the affair when Parisina mutters the name of Hugo (Ugo) in her sleep. In another embellishment by Byron, Parisina and Hugo were engaged to be married before Azo decided to marry her. Also, Azo sentences only Hugo to death; Parisina's fate is unknown, except for the fact that she is forced to witness Hugo's execution and utters a shriek that indicates approaching madness. Azo is tormented by his decision.

A libretto by Felice Romani inspired by Byron's poem was set to music by Gaetano Donizetti in 1833 as Parisina. Pietro Mascagni composed a tragic opera Parisina based on the lyric tragedy written by Gabriele D'Annunzio in 1912 as another adaptation of Byron's poem.

There is also a lesser-known opera by Tomás Giribaldi (1878) and a tragedy by Antonio Somma.

The story has been the subject of paintings by Girolamo Domenichini, Thomas Jones Barker, Ford Madox Brown (a lost work), Giuseppe Bertini, Gaetano Previati, Bartolomeo Giuliano, Domenico Morelli, Maria Orsola Castelnuovo, and Achille Funi.

== Descendants ==
Parisina had twin daughters and a son:

- Lucia d'Este (1419–1437), who married Carlo Gonzaga and died young;
- Ginevra d'Este (1419–1440), who married Sigismund Malatesta and perhaps was killed by him;
- Alberto (1421), who died a few months after birth.
