= Andrea Malatesta =

Italian condottiero

Andrea Malatesta (30 November 1373 – 20 September 1416) was an Italian condottiero, a member of the Malatesta family of Romagna. He is also known as Malatesta da Cesena, a city he had inherited in 1385 from his father, Galeotto, together with Cervia and Bertinoro. In 1388 he was also recognized lord of Fossombrone.

In 1397 he fought for the Bolognesi, who sent him with 200 knights to support the Florentines against Gian Galeazzo Visconti, Duke of Milan. He pushed back Alberico da Barbiano's troops, and then moved to the defence of Mantua; he was however defeated by Jacopo dal Verme, who captured the city. The following year he sided with Braccio da Montone, who was leading a party of exiles from Perugia, in the attempt to retake Mantua, which was now under Biordo dei Michelotti; Biordo hired him for some operations in the Val Nocera.

In 1398 Malatesta was made Senator of Rome by Pope Boniface IX, a position he held for some one year driving some attacks on the Colonna family's lands. In 1399, as the Ghibelline party in the city had organized a plot against him, he confiscated their lands, including Verucchio. In 1402, together with his brother Pandolfo, he went into the service of Galeazzo Maria Visconti, fighting in the expedition against Bologna and in the victorious battle of Casalecchio. After the duke's death, he was hired again by the pope, and in 1403 he was able to expel the Visconti from Bologna, capturing a large booty in the following campaigns in the neighborhood. In 1404 he fought against Alberico da Barbiano, and in 1406 he seized Forlì.

In 1408 Malatesta was hired by Giovanni Maria Visconti of Milan, with the task of countering Facino Cane in the territory of Pavia. Back in Cesena, he allied with Niccolò III d'Este of Ferrara against the lord of Parma, Ottobono Terzi, taking part in the latter's defeat at Modena by Muzio Attendolo. Returned to Cesena, in 1413 he warred against Antipope John XXIII, who was backed by the aggressive new King of Naples, Ladislaus. After a failed attempt to conquer Bologna, he sided with Ladislaus in his capture of Rome. He shortly took part in the siege of Spoleto, which he quit to help Sforza against Paolo Orsini (1369-1416).

After other minor operations, Malatesta was hired by Perugia, which named him capitano generale, against Braccio da Montone. However, he fell ill and was replaced by his brother Carlo Malatesta; he died in September 1416.

== Marriage ==
Malatesta married in 1391 his first marriage Ricciarda or Rengarda Aldosi,daughter of Bertrando Alidoso with whom he had;

- Galeotto Malatesta, married to Nicolina Fortebraccio, da Camerino
- Antonia Malatesta of Cesena (b. 1393-d.1416), married to Gian Maria Visconti, Duke of Milan.
- Elisabetta Malatesta, married to Obizzo da Polenta of Ravenna

Secondly, Malatesta was married to Lucrezia Ordelaffi daughter of Francesco III Ordelaffi

Lucrezia died young and was said to have been poisoned by her father for conspiring against her illegitimate brother Antonio becoming her fathers successor, or by her husband for committing adultery. She died just days after giving birth to their daughter Laura Malatesta (called Parisina)

Thirdly Malatesta married Pollisena Sanseverino with no issue.

== Sources ==
Notes

Bibliography

- Massera, Aldo Francesco (1911). Note Malatestiane. Florence: Galileiana.

Preceded by Joint rule of the Malatesta family	Lord of Cesena; 1389–1416	Succeeded by Carlo I Malatesta
