= Leonello d'Este =

Marquess of Ferrara, Modena and Reggio from 1441 to 1450

- Marquis of Ferrara and Duke of Modena and Reggio Emilia
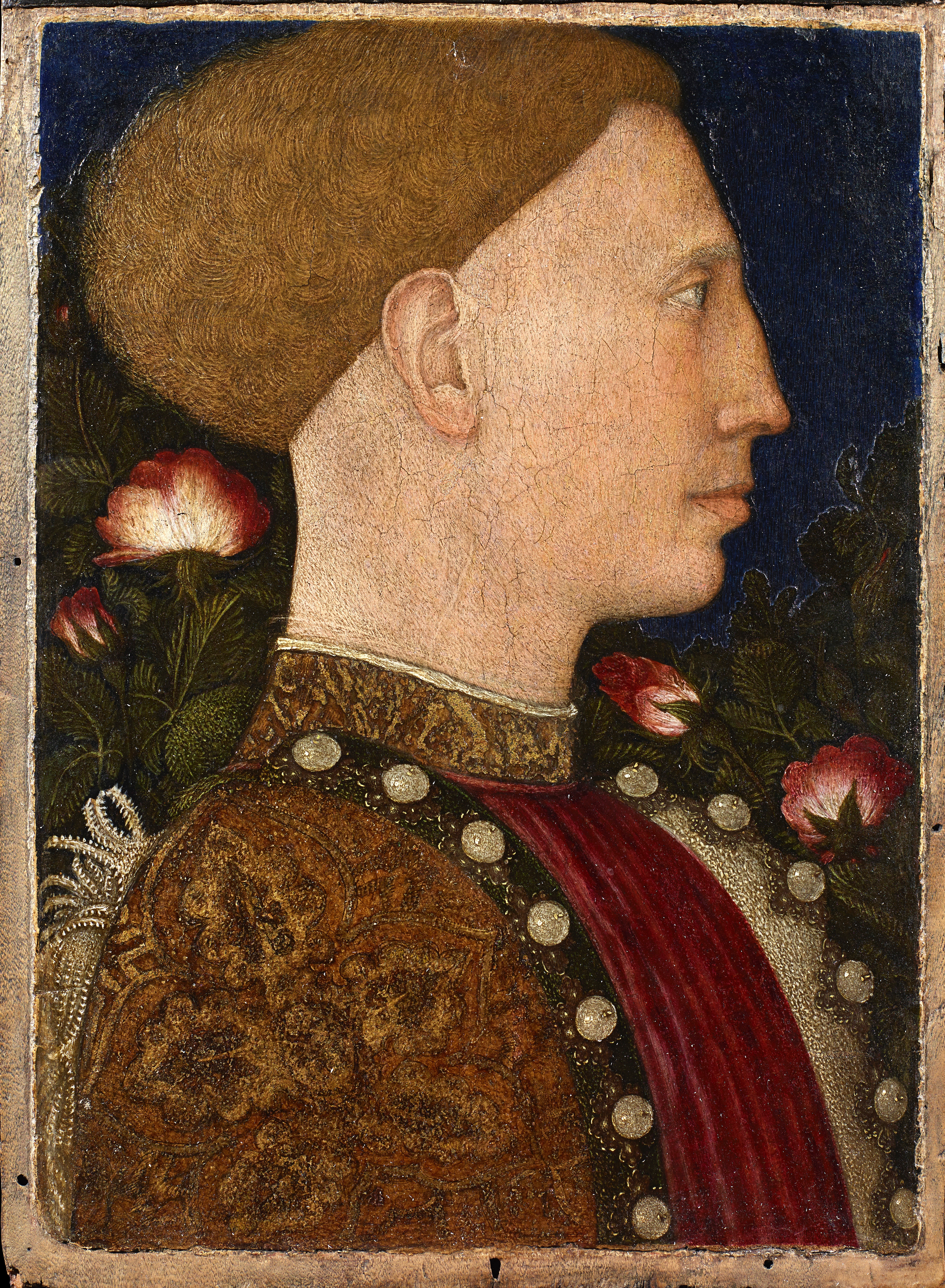
- Portrait of Leonello d'Este (c. 1444), painted by: Antonio di Puccio Pisanello

- Coat of arms
- Born: 21 September 1407; Ferrara
- Died: 1 October 1450 (aged 43)
- Family: Este
- Spouse: Margherita Gonzaga: m. 1435–1439 Mary of Aragon: m. 1444–1450
- Father: Niccolò III d'Este
- Mother: Stella de’ Tolomei

Leonello d'Este (also spelled Lionello; 21 September 1407 – 1 October 1450) was Marquess of Ferrara, Modena, and Reggio Emilia from 1441 to 1450. Despite the presence of legitimate children, Leonello was favoured by his father as his successor. In addition, his virtuous qualities, high level of education, and popularity among the common people as well as his formal papal recognition ultimately made him the most suitable heir.

Leonello had little influence over the Italian political landscape and aristocracy in Ferrara. Contrary to other prior d’Este family leaders, such as Azzo VII, Niccolò III, and Isabella d’Este, who had a drive for power and control, Leonello is recognized principally for his sponsorship of the arts, literature, and culture. In 1441–1450, his learned courts and developing knowledge assisted him in transforming the city of Ferrara. Under the guidance of Guarino Veronese, his humanist teacher, and with the approval of the commune, Leonello began the reformation, particularly, the University of Ferrara.

Leonello not only elevated the humanistic cultural movements during his rule, but it also influenced the political and artistic advancements of his successors. Leonello d’Este served as the precursor of the achievements in the history of the House of Este.

== Biography ==
Map of Italy, Province of Ferrara

Leonello was one of three illegitimate sons of Niccolò d'Este III and Stella de' Tolomei. He received a military education under the condottiero Braccio da Montone, and was tutored by Guarino Veronese, later appointed professor at the University of Ferrara, who also instructed him on the traits of a desirable ruler and how to govern. In 1425, after the execution of his elder brother Ugo Aldobrandino, he was the sole heir of Niccolò. In 1435, he married Margherita Gonzaga on 6 February and was recognized as legitimate son by Pope Martin V. Margherita, who died in 1439, gave birth to a child, Niccolò, in 1438, who is also known as Niccolò di Leonello to avoid confusion with his grandfather Niccolò d'Este III. Niccolò the son died in 1476. In late December 1441, Leonello succeeded to his father's possessions after his death in northern Italy.

Coming from a strong academic background, Leonello brought significant unprecedented economic, political, and cultural changes to Ferrara right after he took over from Niccolò III. In May 1444, Leonello married Mary of Aragon who was at the age of 19, an illegitimate daughter of King Alfonso V of Naples. The marriage was a political one. To ensure the political stability within Ferrara, Leonello remained neutral in the political affairs between Milan and Venice. However, Leonello had a much broader picture for Ferrara, expanding its authority and power in its area. After the death of Margherita Gonzaga, Leonello saw the opportunity of forming alliances with neighboring regions through kinship to strengthen its power. The victory of Alfonso V in Naples, the father of Mary of Aragon, acted as a catalyst for such a diplomatic marriage for Leonello and an opportunity for Ferrara.

Not much progress was made during the rule of Niccolò III as he focused more on political matters and economic prosperity within Ferrara. Leonello was a skilled politician and was responsible for the construction of the first hospital of Ferrara. But he distinguished himself chiefly as a man of culture. Leon Battista Alberti wrote his De Re Aedificatoria at Leonello's commission, and at the Ferrarese court there worked artists such as Pisanello, Iacopo Bellini, Giovanni da Oriolo, Andrea Mantegna, Piero della Francesca and the Netherlandish Rogier van der Weyden. His personal breviary was sold in a fragmented state in 1958 by Baron Llangattock at Christie's. It has since then been known as the Llangattock breviary. It was created under the artistic direction of Giorgio d´Alemagna and painters like Matteo De Pasti and Jacopo Magnanimo contributed to it. Leaves from it are in the collections of museums such as the Louvre in Paris, the Danish National Library, and several private collections.

During his rule, the University of Ferrara gained a European prestige.

Leonello died in 1450, aged 43. He was succeeded by Borso d'Este, his father's illegitimate son.

== Family background and history ==
=== Parents and succession ===
Statue of Niccolò III d'Este
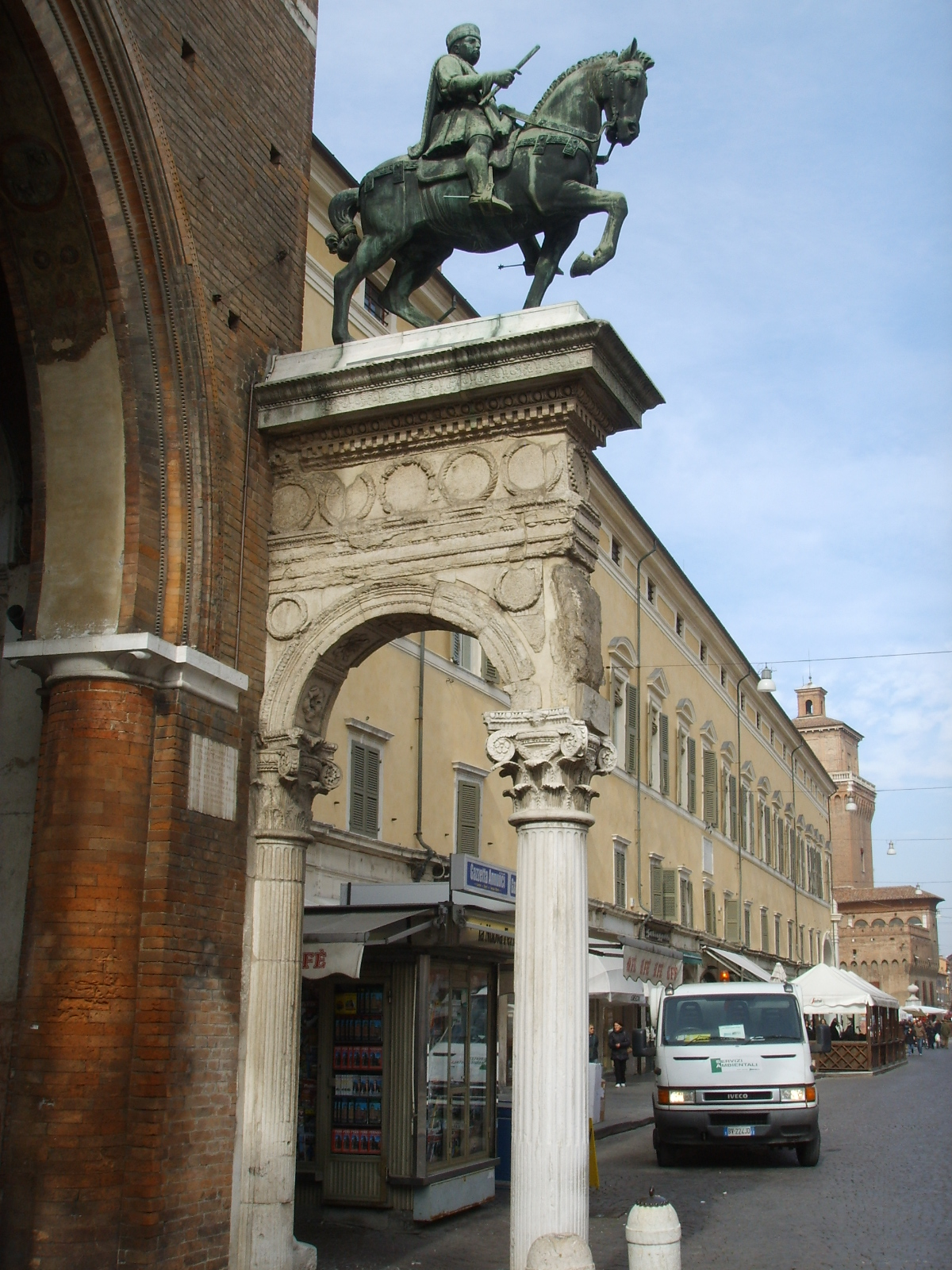
- A statue of Leonello's father, Niccolò III d'Este. It is a 20th-century replica, before the Town Hall of Ferrara (Palazzo Municipale), of the 15th century equestrian bronze monument to Niccolò III of Este. The original statue is attributed to Leon Battista Alberti.

Leonello d’Este's father, Niccoló d’Este III, was also an illegitimate son himself. At the age of nine, Niccoló became legitimated as the successor of Leonello's grandfather, Alberto. However, Leonello's circumstances for securing his rights to succession differed from his father's, primarily because Niccoló was Alberto's only son while Leonello was in a competition with his younger legitimate brothers.

In the presence of his legitimate sons from his later marriage, Niccoló needed to prove that Leonello was qualified to be chosen as his successor. Niccoló defended Leonello's rights to succession on three grounds: Leonello's personal attributes, popularity among his subjects, and official papal recognition. Leonello was often praised for exhibiting strong leadership skills and virtuous characteristics, which would make him a worthy heir and future ruler of Ferrara. In addition, Leonello was taught under esteemed humanist teachers such as Guarino da Verona. His father noted that this high level of education further distinguished Leonello from his siblings. Leonello was also popular among the people and his father recognized the wide support that Leonello would receive from his subjects, who approved of Leonello being chosen as Niccoló's successor. Furthermore, the papacy officially recognized Leonello as a legitimate heir. Thus, by 1434, Leonello was given a great deal of authority to co-rule with his father.

Leonello's succession and subsequent marriage would also serve an important role in relations with neighbouring city-states. Previously, the House of Este owed a great debt to Gianfrancesco Gonzaga, the ruler of Mantua. Instead of having this debt paid monetarily, Gonzaga agreed to have his daughter Margarita marry Leonello, in exchange for Niccoló promising his daughter's line of descendants the position of lords in Ferrara. Hence, the two rulers sought to use the marriage of their children to both their advantages, by resolving the issue of debt and also improving their relationship with the other city-state. This was also advantageous for Leonello, as he was guaranteed political support from another ruler through his marriage.

Meanwhile, Leonello's younger legitimate brothers were also vying for the same position. Because of the potential political conflict that could arise between these siblings, Leonello's father was very cautious of officially appointing Leonello as his successor. Although Leonello was able to co-rule with his father since 1434, Niccoló waited until his last will, which was written just before his death, to formally recognize Leonello as his heir. Niccoló's final will also protected the claims of his legitimate sons Ercole and Sigismondo and ensured that they were each given 10,000 ducats. Following his father's death in 1441, Leonello finally became recognized as the formal heir and the new Marquis of Ferrara.

=== Family context ===
The circumstances of Leonello's succession as an illegitimate son fit into the historical context of successions in the House of Este. The history of heirs in the House of Este was distinct from those of other Italian city-states because of the frequency of illegitimate sons being chosen as the future heirs. This also reflects the gender attitudes regarding the political successions in the House of Este during this time period. A greater preference was given for illegitimate sons to become successors, instead of legitimate daughters. Leonello himself was also succeeded by a man who had an illegitimate birth status. His brother, Borso, who was born from the same mother of Leonello, was later chosen to be Leonello's successor.

== Culture, art and literature ==
=== Culture ===
==== University ====
Palazzo dell'Università di Ferrara
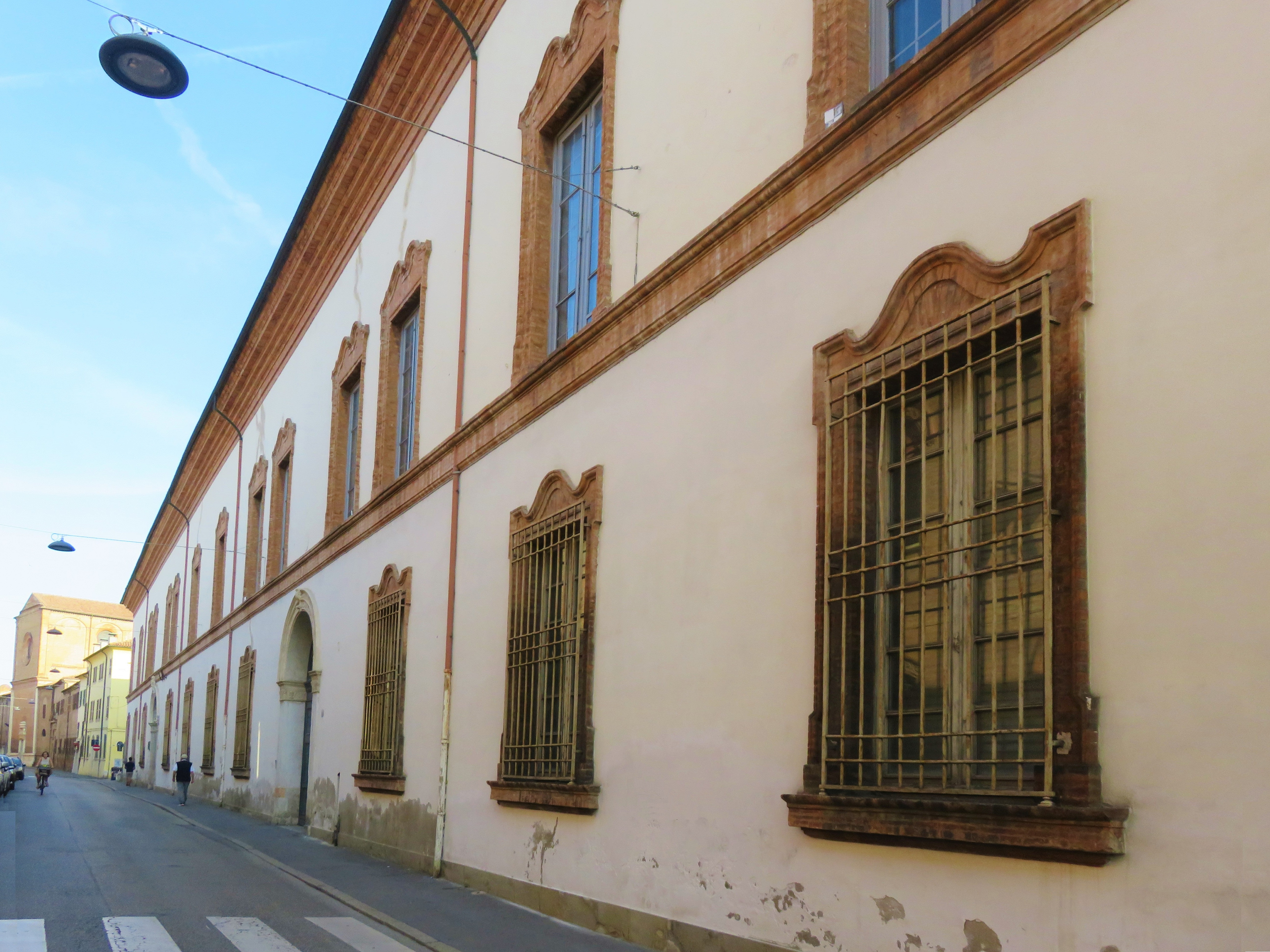
- The University of Ferrara Palace

La facoltà di lettere dell'Università di Ferrara.
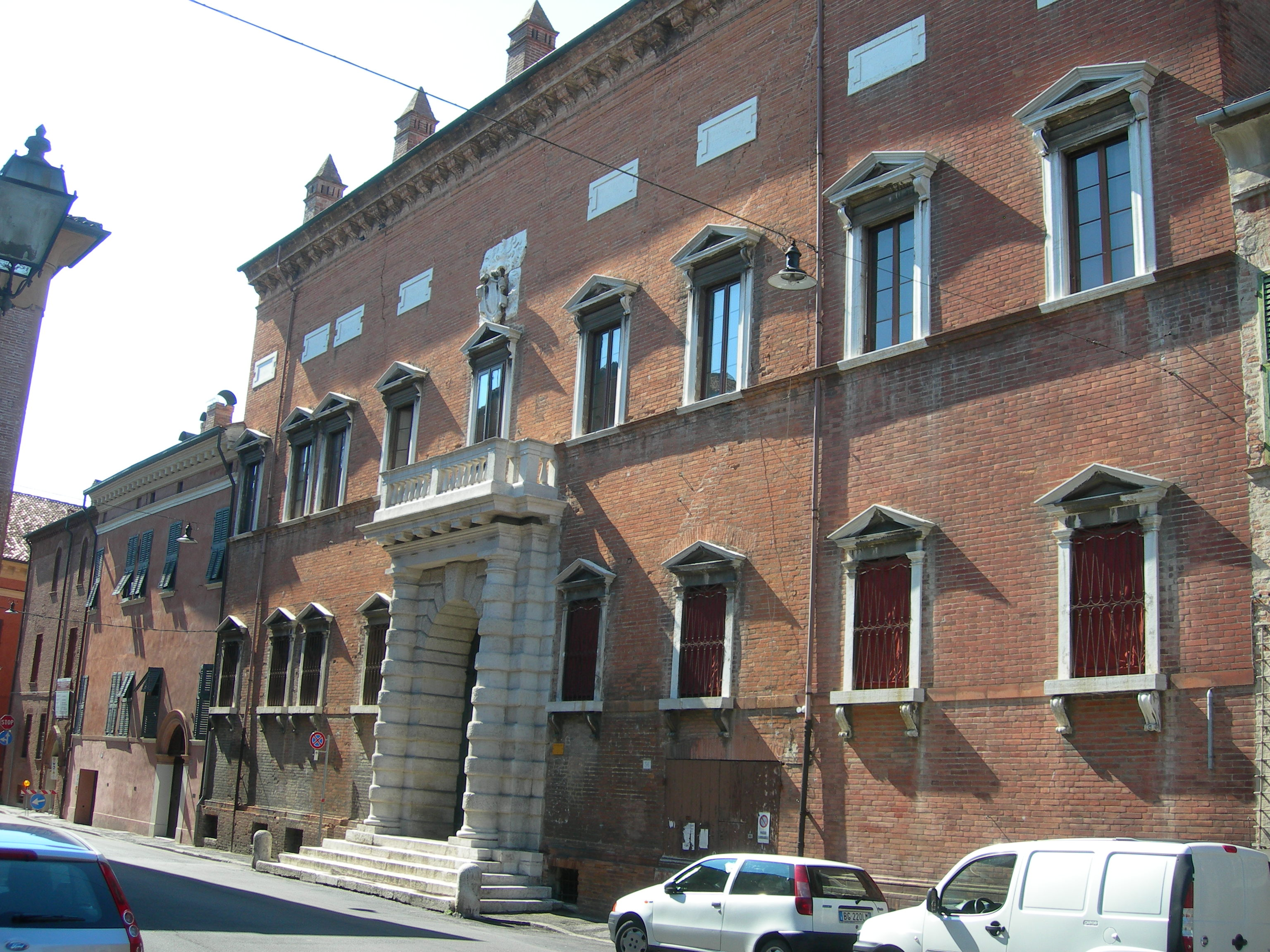
- The Liberal Arts College at the University of Ferrara

Polo Chimico Bio Medico dell'Università di Ferrara.
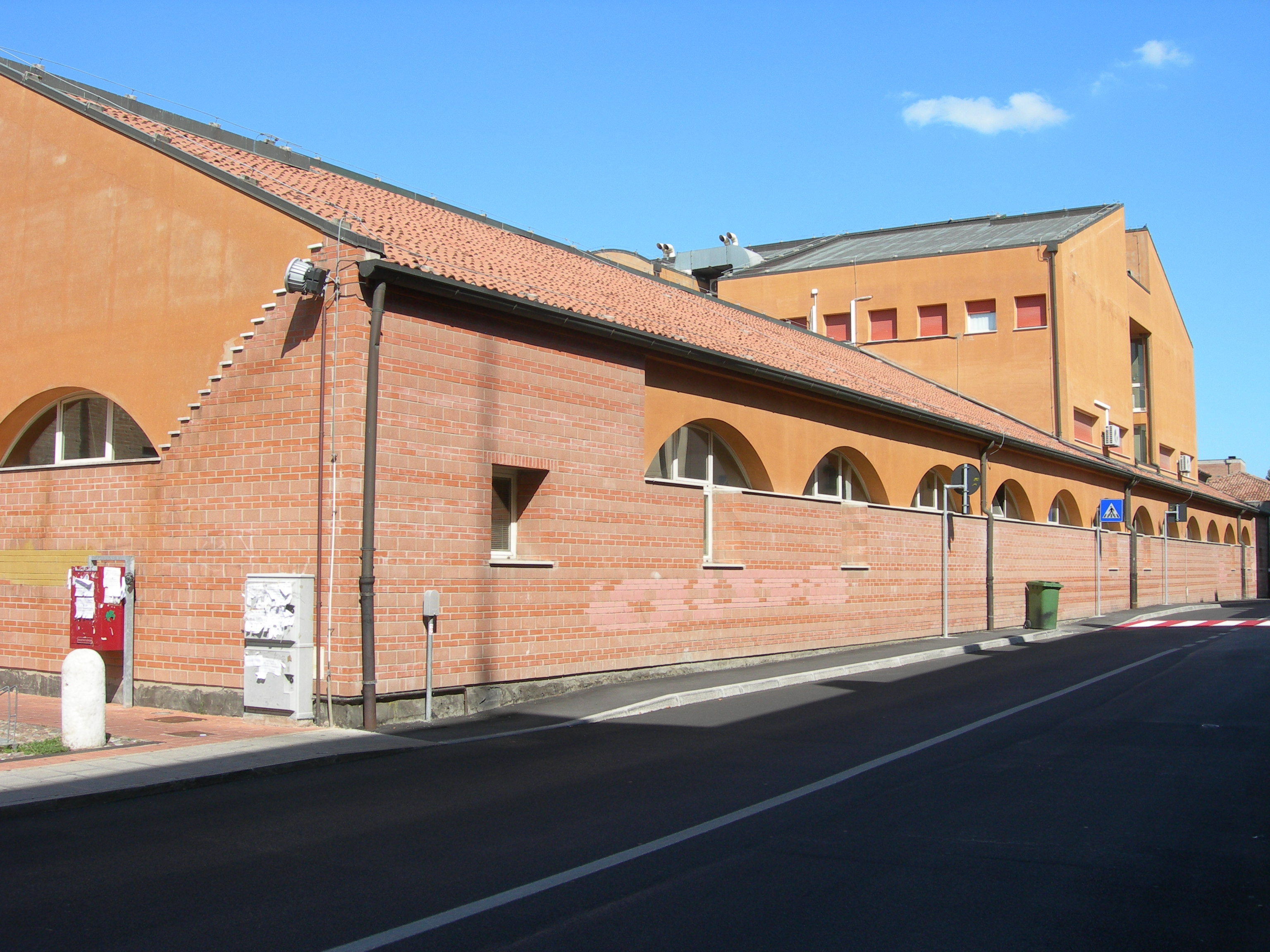
- The Faculty of Medicine Building at the University of Ferrara

La facoltà d'Architettura dell'Università di Ferrara
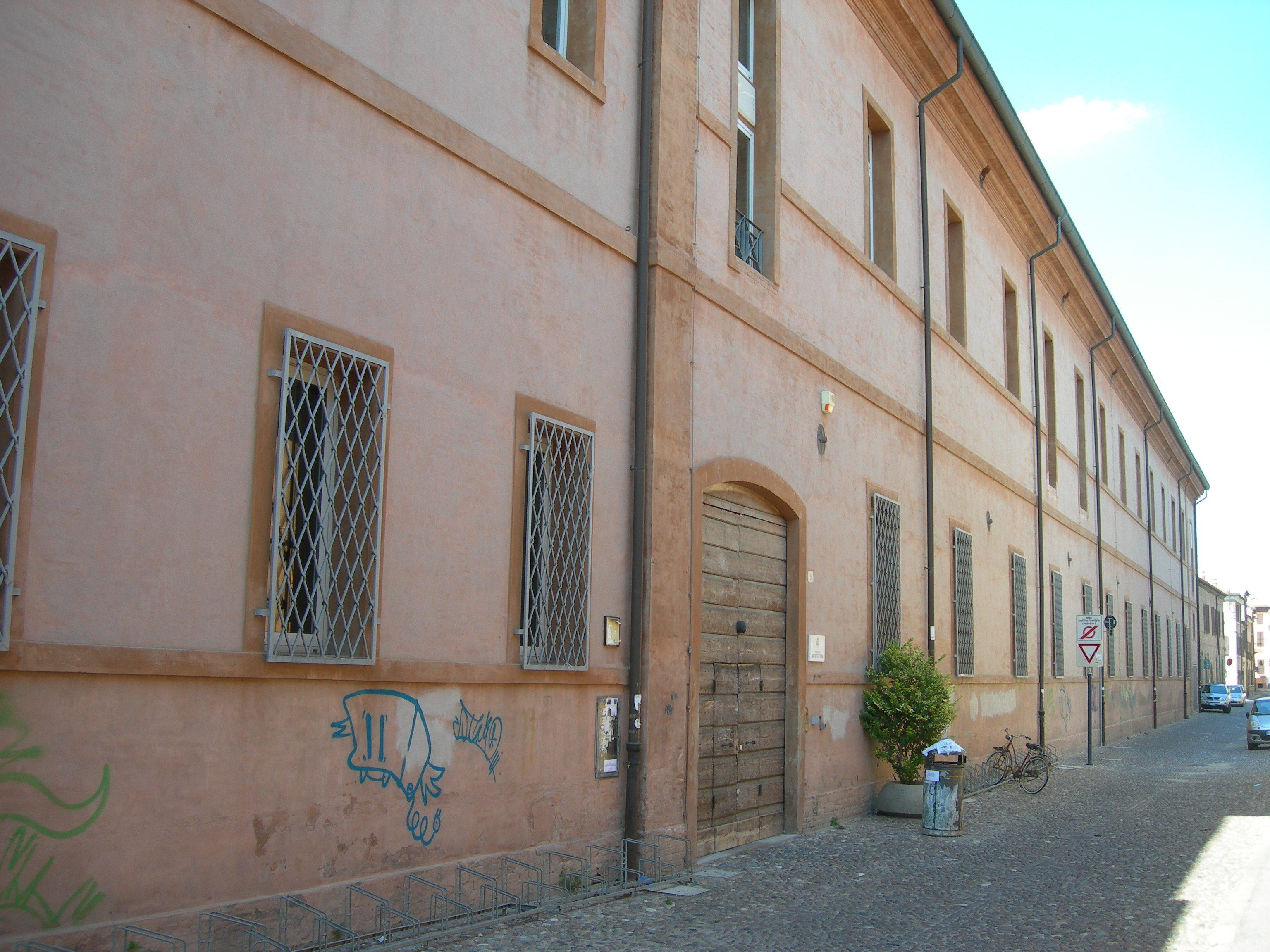
- The College of Architecture Building at the University of Ferrara

The University of Ferrara dates back to 1391. It was not until 1442—one year into the reign of Leonello d’Este—that it became a fully operational university with an adequate number of professors to instruct the major subjects of canon law (church law), logic, philosophy and medicine. Hence, while the traditional date for the beginning of the university is 1391, 1442 is now considered its true founding date, because that is when it grew in size and overall awareness within Ferrara and the surrounding towns. When the university was granted the charter to be allowed to grant degrees on 4 March 1391 in civil and canon law, arts, medicine and theology, the university had only two professors of law, and no evidence has been found of university-level arts and theology instruction. The university was closed down in 1394, less than three years after its opening. Due to wartime expenses, teaching ceased in 1404; in 1418 Niccolò III – the father of Leonello, who ruled from 1393 to 1441 – tried but was unsuccessful in reopening the university.

In 1442, Leonello d’Este and the commune of Ferrara agreed on the reestablishing of a university. The great humanists and Leonello's tutor, Guarino Guarini of Verona (1374–1460), most likely encouraged Leonello in developing a fully operational university for Ferrara.

A meeting in January 1442 between Leonello and the commune, resulted in the agreement for the need for a university, saying it would be "a distinguished center of learning [that] would bring renown to the city, local men would more easily obtain degrees, and an influx of students would bolster the city’s economy." In order to raise funds, the commune placed a sales tax on meats and through the money raised was able to pay a large portion of the faculty for the university; Leonello contributed financially in order to keep the university afloat. 18 October 1442 was the official date for the opening of the university. Guarino Guarini of Verona became a humanist professor at the university, and gave the inaugural oration praising humanistic and university subjects. By the end of Leonello's reign in 1450, surviving records state that within the faculty of law there were twelve professors and 13 in the faculty of arts. The university had become successful in what Leonello and the commune of Ferrara had hoped for.

==== Learned courts and humanism ====
De Politia litteraria illustration (Angelo Decembrio, 1540)
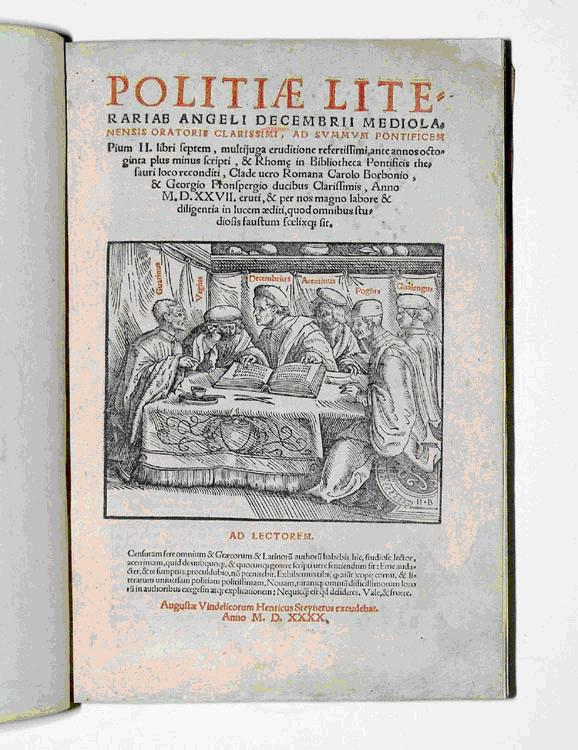
- An illustration from Angelo Decembrio's De Politia litteraria, it was first published in 1540 after he died.

Leonello was held in high regard by humanists who fantasized about him as being the patron and the defender of the arts; Leonello also symbolized the perfect model of a prince and a man of letters. Leonello's education of the new principles in the studia humanitatais and his bias for the arts were what allowed Leonello to develop a widespread cultural development in Ferrara. From this, he was able to decree the reformation and extension of the University of Ferrara and conveying of public and private conferences that brought scholars to come teach at the university such as Teodoro Gazs who was a master in Greek, and Basinio Basini, the Parmesan poet, who was well known from his Latin rhetoric. Leonello, for his successful peacemaking policy, was hailed as salus Italiae and specs Italum, and in 1448 the mythological poem "Melegridos" – about the mythical hunt for a ferocious boar – was used as an imaginative representation to demonstrate how Leonello dealt with the policy. Leonello d' Este became known as the patron of the arts in the eyes of such humanists as Angelo Decembrio.

Angelo was a humanist and Milanese scholar who moved to Ferrara in 1438. Decembrio's connection to Leonello comes from his work he wrote before 1447, the De Politia Litteraria Variisque Poetae Virgilli Laudbibus, which was a dialogue divided into three volumes; four more books were added around 1462. The treatise was about how to successfully sustain the refinement of literature/politia litteraria in a courtly environment. The work also focused on the description of Ferrara; Angelo also included his thoughts about Leonello within the overall depiction. The text description reads (in translation) that: "the city of Ferrara, with its streets, gardens and villas and, in the heart of the city, the d’Este court, whose greatest attribute is the enormous library. The library, with its sumptuous furnishings and judicious choice of volumes (with a distinct preference for classical literature) is the perfect image of what constitutes a vital sector of the prince’s investment in culture in the second half of the fifteenth century. The d’Este library, passionately and painstakingly supplemented by Leonello…[as it is a place] of authentic cultural reference, but above all…[enhances] the prestige of the prince as patron of the arts".

The court of Leonello d’Este could not be matched by his successor Borso d’Este concerning the immense cultural dynamics that Leonello's office had. This may be why many scholars and intellectuals left Ferrara. The Humanists Decembrio, Gaza and Basinio were three of the most prominent intellectuals to leave the court of Este upon the death of Leonello in 1450.

==== Music (Pietrobono) ====
Lute
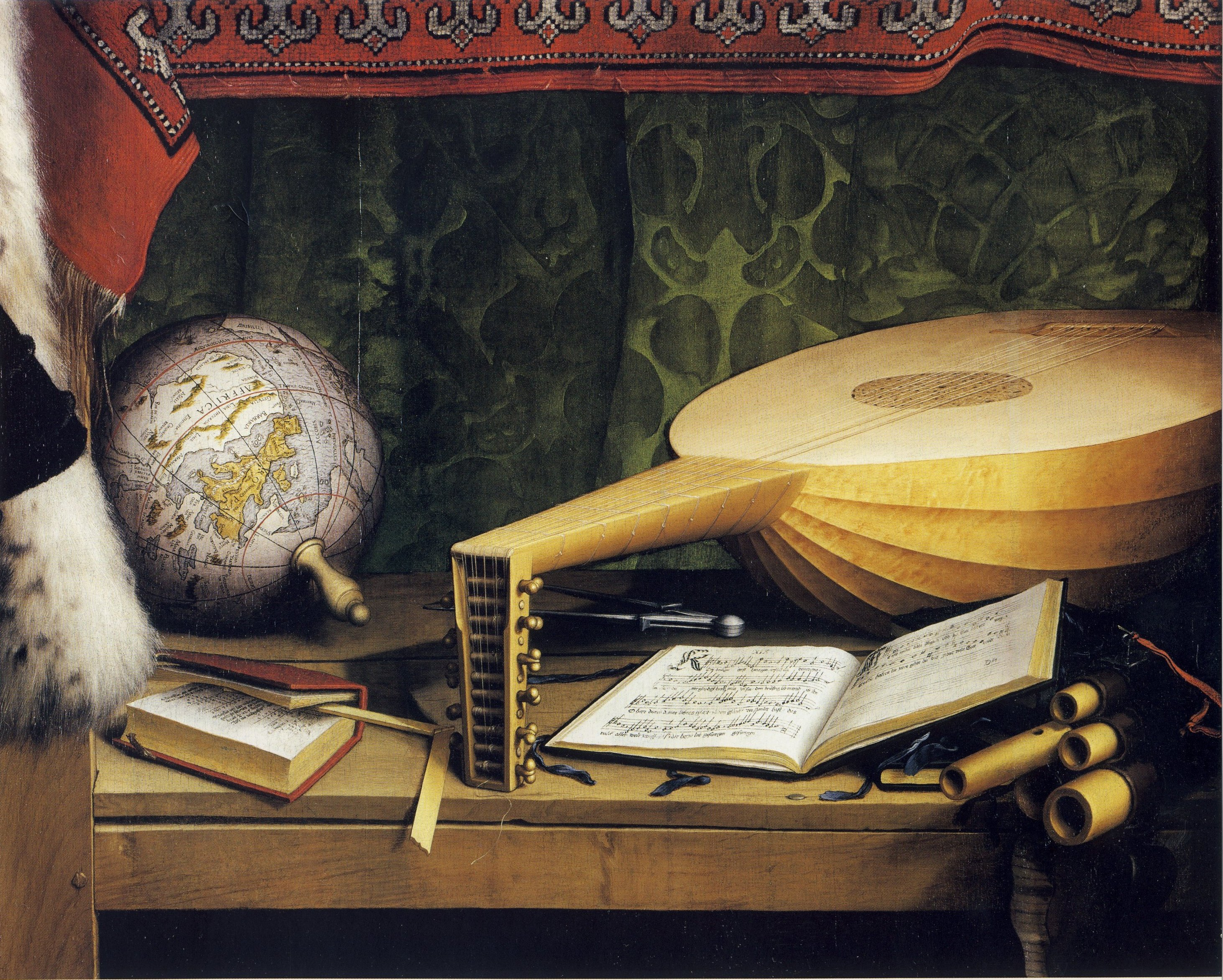
- The Ambassadors (1533), painting by Hans Holbein the Younger (1498–1543): this section of the painting depicts details of a globe and lute with two books.

Within the court of Leonello, Pietrobono became a successful musician and was favoured within the Ferrarese court, in the court of Leonello. He would perform his music on a lute. Pietrobono's first appearance was in the early court of Leonello d' Este of 1441. In terms of personal fame, Pietrobono stands above musicians such as Corrado and many other Ferrarese musicians. During the first year of Leonello's reign, Pietrobono-who was in his mid-twenties—was given the sum of twenty gold ducats/coins by Leonello which was the sum that was apparently the common payment that the Este family had use in the past, with such people as Dufay in 1437. By the mid-1440s Pietrobono had a substantial increase in pay and salary during the reign of Leonello.

=== Art ===
==== Piero della Francesca ====
Leonello commissioned Piero della Francesca to paint frescos of well known Roman battles, in particular the battles between the Roman general Scipio and the Carthaginian general Hannibal. Leonello's interest in Roman Antiquity had to do with his education and exposure to humanism under the instruction of his tutor Angelo Decembrio. Leonello would at times bring in artists from the Low Countries. The bringing in of Flemish artists has prompted a debate over whether Piero possibly appropriated from Flemish artists. Piero would have had contact with some of them, such as Rogier van der Weyden, who was in Ferrara in the 1440s, during the period of Leonello's reign.

==== The da Lendinara brothers ====
Leonello commissioned Cristoforo and Lorenzo Conozi da Lendinara, as they were specialists in the art of inlaid wood, intarsia. The brothers used to work for Piero Della Francesca, and when Leonello commissioned them and while the brothers were working in his palace; their friendship with Piero developed further as Piero was painting frescos close to Leonello's estate.

==== Antonio di Puccio Pisanello ====
The Singing Lion: Obverse Side
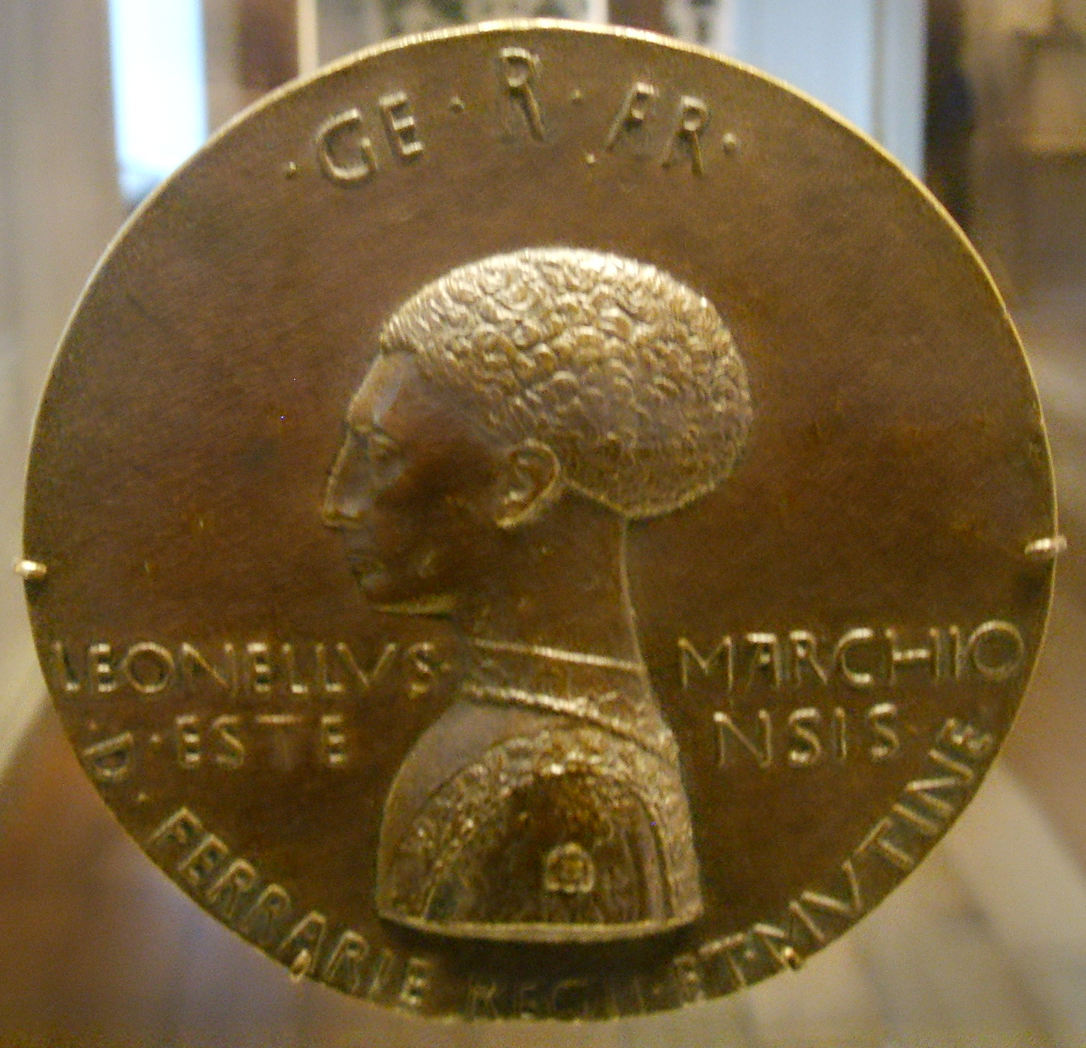
- The Singing Lion (1444), by Antonio di Puccio Pisanello.

The Singing Lion: Reverse Side
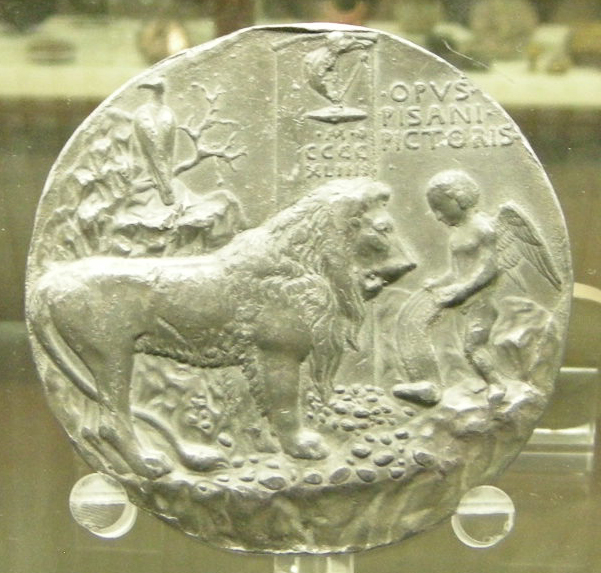
- The Singing Lion (1444), by Antonio di Puccio Pisanello.

Leonello went to Pisanello to get medallions made so that he would be remembered long after his death, and to demonstrate his fame and power for the present and the future people of Ferrara. The medals from 1441, 1444 and 1450 all demonstrate the characteristics of Leonello and/or his court. Each coin has on one side a portrait of Leonello in Roman emperor portraiture style, and has on the other side an image that represents Leonello and his court.

The coin of 1441, the Little Lion of Ferrara; was designed by Pisanello to look like a Greco-Roman style coin, since Leonello was a collector of them. The Feline image is a play on Leonello's name, which means little lion. The hair was also designed to look like a lion's mane, to represent Leonello's status and nature as marquis. The coin is in the British Museum.

The Singing Lion of 1444 also plays off Leonello's name The design with the lion and angels represented aspects of the Este family history, specifically with association to Leonello and his court. It is at the Victoria and Albert Museum in London, England.

The 1450 coin has the same bust style on the obverse side as the previous coins in order to emulate Roman currency while depicting the thirteenth Marquis of Ferrara. This coin is also in the Victoria and Albert Museum.

Some scholars, such as Alan Stahl, have looked back at descriptions of the coins by later writers, and comes to the conclusion that even though Leonello and Pisanello crafted and designed the coins to look like the currency of Roman antiquity, their makeup and metal were very much medieval. Stahl also mentions that the replication process was developed about a century after Leonello's death, so even though Pisanello's coins were for Leonello – according to Alan – it was the beginning of the development for replication within Ferrara, which would develop in the following centuries.

==== Giovanni da Oriolo ====
Leonello d'Este (Giovanni)
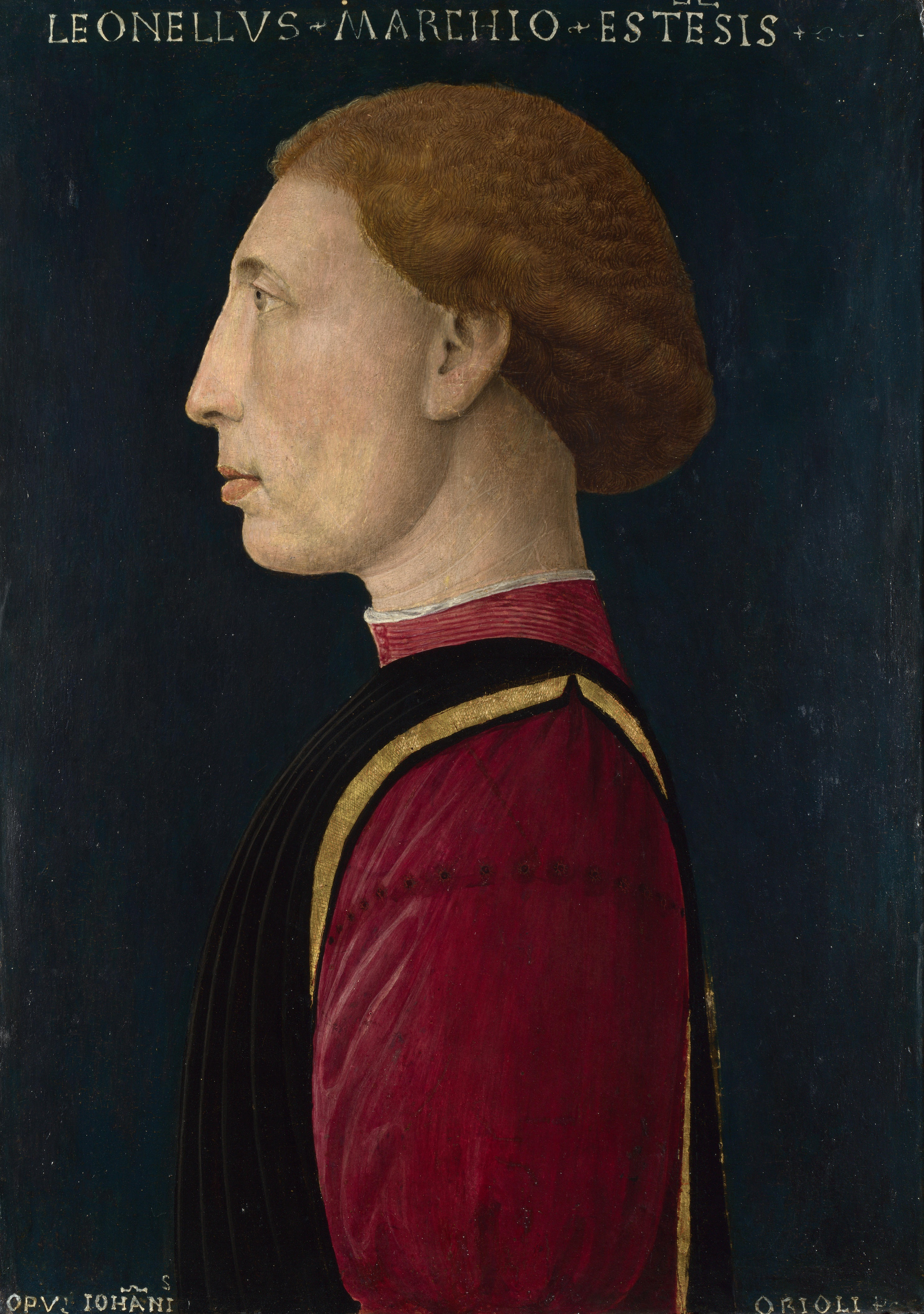
- Portrait of Leonello d'Este (1447), by Giovanni da Oriolo. This is Giovanni's only identifiable work.

Already in 1439, Giovanni da Oriolo had been an active artist in Faenza. Leonello d’Este employed him in 1447, and Giovanni's only identified picture is his portrait of Leonello. Oriolo's portrait of Leonello was painted to look like a Roman coin—like the coins of Pisanello —which was common in 15th century Italy. It is in the National Gallery in London, England.

=== Literature ===
==== De Re Aedificatoria, Leon Battista Alberti ====
De Re Aedificatoria
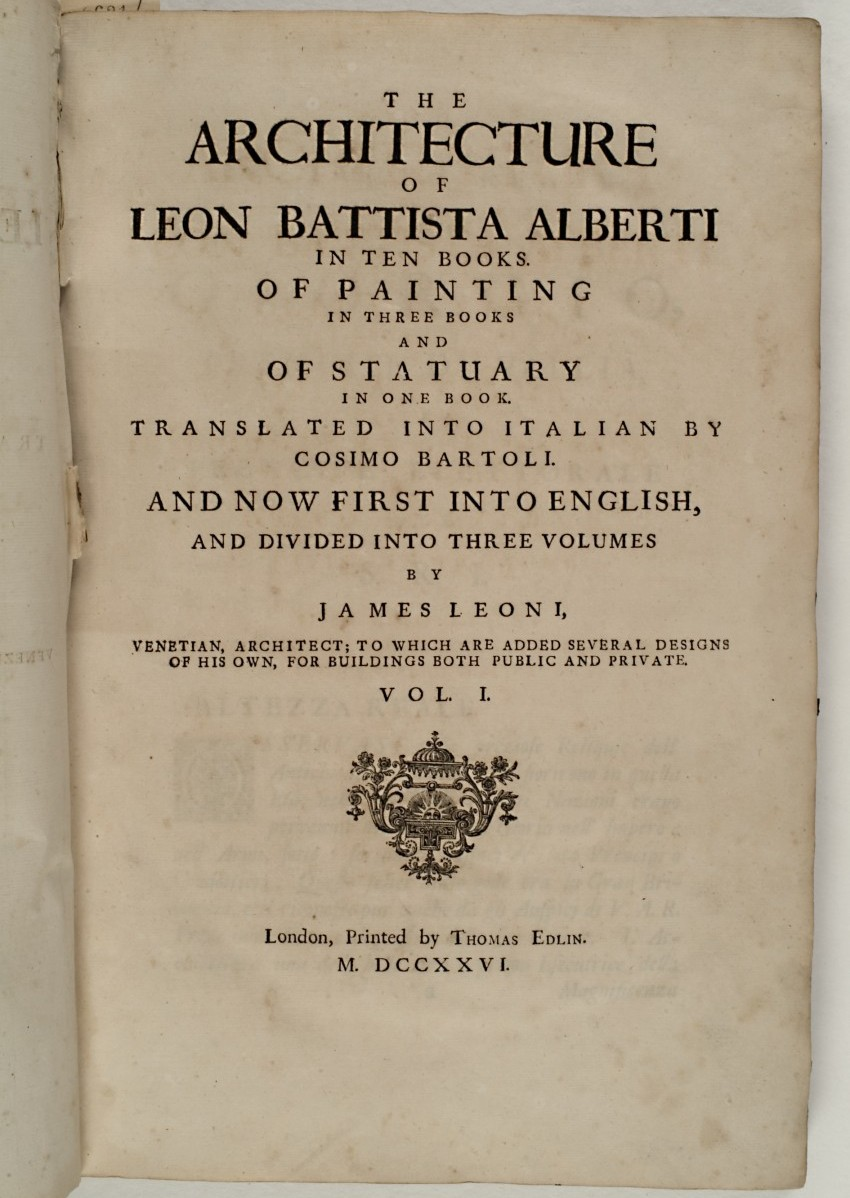
- The title page of Giacomo Leoni's 18th century English translation of Leon Battista Alberti's 15th Century Italian Architectural treatise, the De Re Aedificatoria.

Leon Battista Alberti was a famous mathematician and architect who had a connection with Leonollo d’Este through the development of the text the De Re Aedificatoria. The book detailed the concerns regarding materials, construction, overall principles and foundation of the overall design, and the ideas behind public and private buildings. It also spoke about the different types of building façades and discussed ways to fix construction errors. When Leonello was younger and his father was still in power, he would associate himself with people of great intellectual capacity; Alberti was one of his favourites. In 1441, Leonello invited Alberti to judge a competition to find an artist to create a sculpture of his father. It was thought that this particular treatise would be dedicated to Leonello since he was the one that prompted the writing of the De Re Aedificatoria to Alberti. However, due to Leonello's death in 1450, the treatise went to Pope Nicholas V for papal use in the construction of new buildings, since Rome was in a period of immense construction projects. Leonello's friendship and overall prompting to Alberti allowed for the architectural treatise to become a reality, as well as gave Alberti the opportunity to reintroduce the ideas of Vitruvius to the common person in the 15th century. Through his influence as Marquis and the family name of Este, Leonello was able to develop the De Re Aedificatoria under his reign.

== Political influence ==
Ercole I of Ferrara
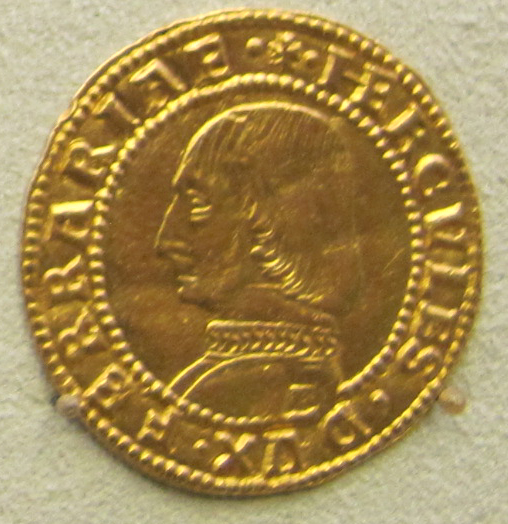
- Obverse side of gold coin with portrait of Ercole I of Ferrara

Portrait of Isabella d'Este
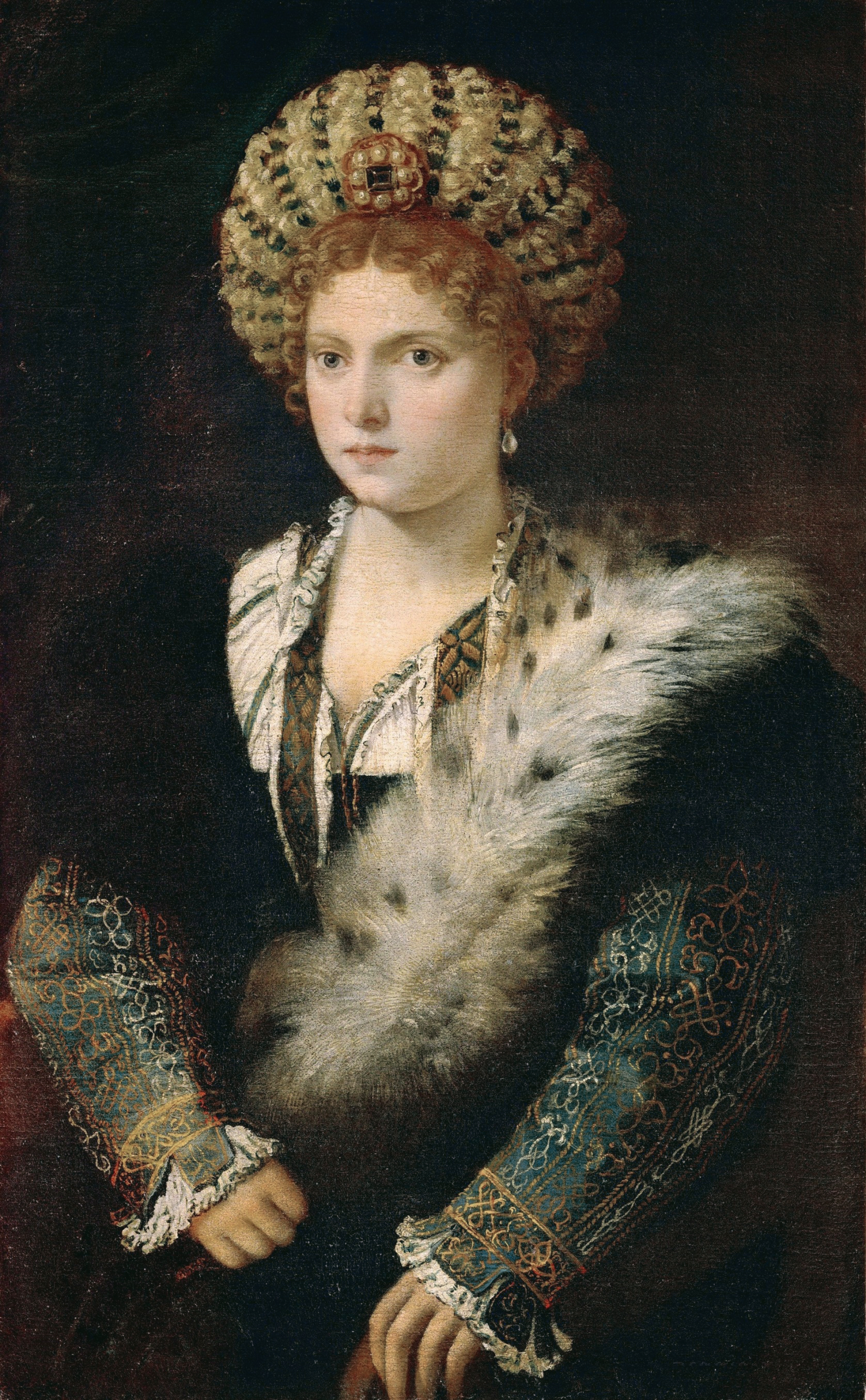
- Painted by artist Tiziano Vecellio (1490–1576). Painted between the years 1534–1536.

Portrait of Borso d'Este
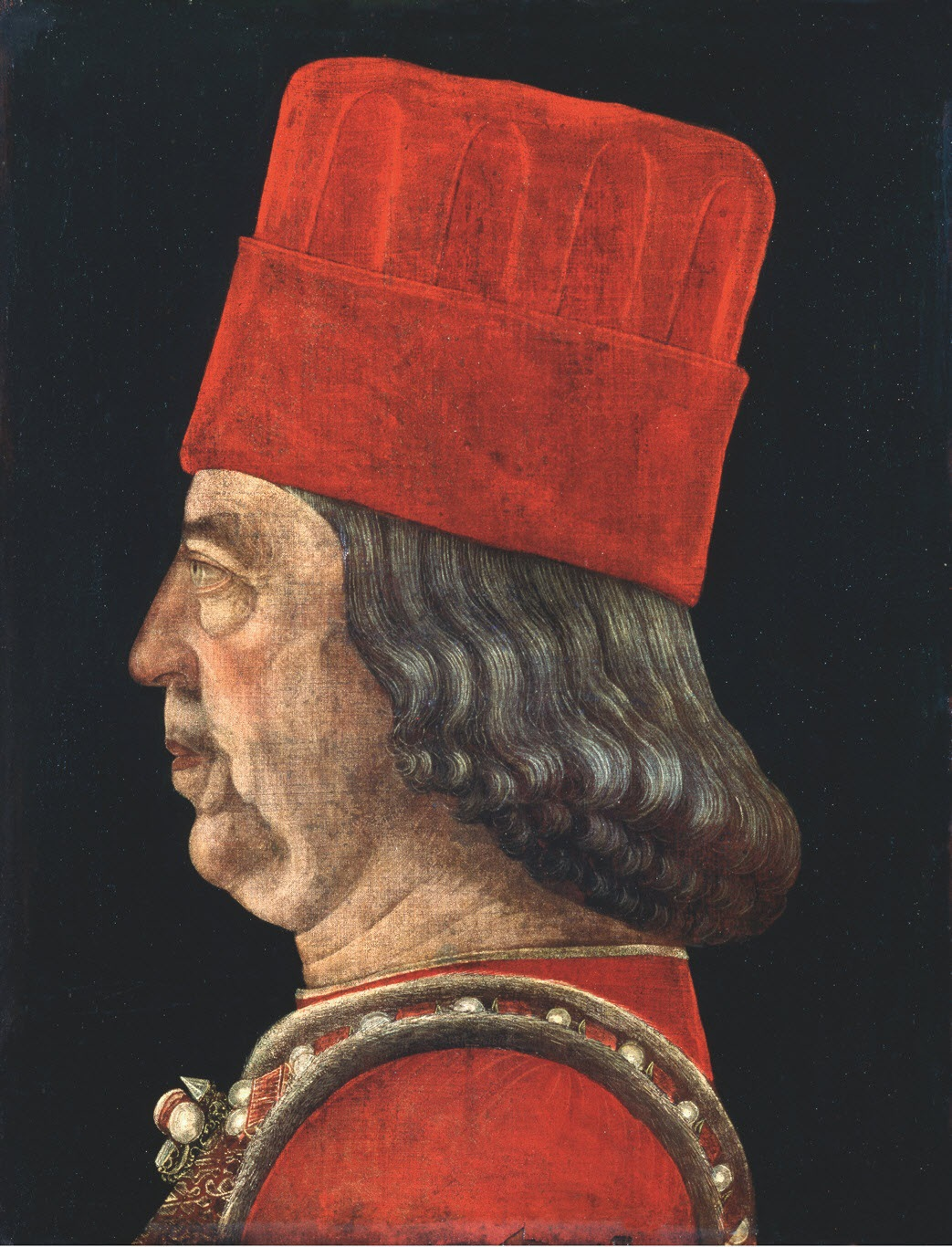
- Painted by Vicino da Ferrara (1432–1509). Painted in 1469 or 1471.

Unlike his politically driven father, Nicolo III, Leonello d’Este (1407 to 1450), exerted significant influence over the Italian political landscape and aristocracy by being a man of culture and giving support to the arts. Leonello's legacy would remain that of a man of culture, with other members of the d’Este family pursuing political leadership such as Nicollo III, Ercole I and Isabella d’Este.

=== Ferrara political background ===
The House of Este, a princely family of Lombardy ruling in Ferrara between the 13th and 16th centuries, contributed a great deal to Italy during this period. The Estense dynasty gained the Ferrara territory in 1240 in addition to their other lands. Over various periods of time, however, a considerable amount of their territory was lost to French papal and imperial forces. Dukes in Ferrara were elected through a formal voting process by the citizens. When appointed they were given a hereditary title. After the marriage of Azzo V to the heiress of a rival family and the successor of Obizzo I, grandson Azzo VII, bringing political prominence to Ferrara. By 1240, Azzo VII had control of Ferrara (in alliance with Pope Gregory IX), which marked the start of the Este rule. The Estense government was faced with papal opposition from the onset, however, by the start of the 14th century had recovered its political influence and strength under Nicolo II. His successor, Nicolo III is remembered for having further strengthened power in Ferrara and introducing the Estense political influence to Italy. Succeeding a Paduan attempt to gain authority in Ferrara, Nicolo III was commended as go-between in the political and military disputes in the Italian states, extending Ferrara's territory and domain. Nicolò III "raised the Estense state to a high position in Italian politics in spite of its territorial and financial limits".

=== Leonello political influence and the Papacy ===
Following the beheading of Leonello's elder brother by his father, the heir of the throne to Ferrara was vacant. As his father's chosen successor, Leonello (reigning from 1441 to 1450), provided Ferrara a leader with substantial merit in the fields of art and culture. Leonello's education by humanist Guarino Veronese directed his interest towards the humanism and art. Leonello was chosen to be the heir of the d’Este patrimony through papal sanction, by his father at the age of 21. After the passing of his first wife, Margherita Gonzana, Leonello married Maria d’Aragona, an illegitimate daughter of the King of Naples. This marriage was significant as it established a kinship with Naples, having influence both politically and culturally. Leonello's leadership did result in some minor improvements to the local economy in Ferrara, however, his major influence remained in the cultural sphere. Leonello reopened the university in Ferrara, establishing a new Faculty of Arts in commemoration of his humanist teacher Guarino Veronese. Leonello's governing also brought improvements to the court library, commissioning copyists to produce manuscripts in both French and Italian. Leonello's piety was indicated in local developments such as "poor-relief, hospital construction and improvement of local ecclesiastical institutions". The construction of a Chapel during Leonello's governing is demonstrative of this new concentration of the domestic domain of the Este court. Over time Leonello's rule in Ferrara has been defined by his cultural contributions.

=== Political influence following Leonello ===
Leonello's rule was followed in Ferrara by his half-brother Ercole I, who garnered substantial political support. Ercole I feared that France would desert Ferrara, and considered France as a danger and an "obstacle to overcome". Ercole I demonstrated his fear of the French through plotting an attack on his French bride Renée's entourage 1534. Succeeding Ercole I was another significant political player in the House of Este, Isabella d’Este, whom married Francesco Gonzaga in 1490. Isabella is remembered for her determination and unusual aptitude for a forward-thinking "political strategy". Isabella's fascination and involvement with political strategy and intelligence sparked the literary trend by women in 15th century Italy, being an influential aspect of the new "literary discourse" about women that occurred in the northern courts of Italy. Isabella was an advocate for female education, as she believed that it would construct masculine characteristics of practicality and strength, which are fundamental aspects of asserting political authority. The house of Este had many politically driven leaders in power, however Leonello d’Este remains primarily known and acknowledged for his involvement with humanism, the arts and culture.

== Death, legacy and successor ==
On 1 October 1450, Leonello suddenly died of unknown causes. Borso d'Este, his brother, succeeded the throne of Marquis of Ferrara. In stark contrast to his brother, Borso received little education and was more interested in political affairs. During the reign of Borso, the legacy of art and literature proceeded with a rather stagnant growth as they were mostly used for military propaganda and entertainment. Aside from cultural developments, however, Borso utilized the foundation laid down by his brother, Leonello, to assist him in reforming the structure and organization of the state. In particular, the diplomatic relationship previously built up by Leonello served as a basis for Borso to further leverage its alliance with other cities. The impact of Leonello, however, was much greater and lasted much longer than the reign of Borso. The ties between the Kingdom of Naples and Ferrara carried on to the realm of Ercole, who succeeded Borso d’Este as Duke of Ferrara. Ercole married with Eleonora d’Aragona, Maria's niece, under the same contract Leonello signed in 1444 with Naples. Because of this, the strong alliance between the Este family and Naples kept Ferrara safe during the struggles between Milan and Venice in the 15th century.

The flourishing of cultural movements later in Ferrara was mainly attributed to the efforts of Leonello. Today, the University of Ferrara continues to be one of the top universities in Europe. Compared with the three main divisions in the 15th century – arts, law, and medicine – the university now offers eight distinct fields of studies ranging from liberal arts to sciences. With the push of Leonello and the contribution of the Este family, the intellectual and cultural movements defined the history of Ferrara in the 15th century.

The building activities of Leonello essentially made Ferrara into a humanistic center as the reformation of the University of Ferrara not only attracted students, scholars, and philosophers from all over Europe, but the burgeoning of artistic advancements in art and architecture also allowed artists to fully develop themselves within the city. Its environment naturally became an artistic center for later artists, which led to further developments in art and music in the 15th century. The gradual series of reformation ultimately turned Ferrara into a significant heritage site in Europe and now Ferrara is listed as one of UNESCO World Heritage Sites.

== Sources ==
- Banker, James R. Piero della Francesca: Artist and Man, United Kingdom: Oxford University Press, 2014.
- Baxandall, Michael. "A Dialogue on Art from the Court of Leonello d'Este: Angelo Decembrio's De Politia Litteraria Pars LXVIII." Journal of the Warburg and Courtauld Institutes 26, no. 3 – 4 (1963): 304 – 326.
- Bayer, Andrea (2008). Art and Love in Renaissance Italy. Metropolitan Museum of Art.
- Bestor, Jane Fair (1996). "Bastardy and Legitimacy in the Formation of a Regional State in Italy: The Estense Succession". Comparative Studies in Society and History. 38 (3): 549–585. doi:10.1017/s0010417500020053. S2CID 143587444.
- Blaisdell, Charmarie Jenkins. 1975. Politics and heresy in Ferrara, 1534–1559. The Sixteenth Century Journal 6, (1): 67–93.
- Carroll, Linda L. "'Fools of the Dukes of Ferrara': Dosso, Ruzante, and Changing Este Alliances." MLN 118, no. 1 (2003): 60–84.
- Cavallo, Jo Ann (2004). The Romance Epics of Boiardo, Ariosto, and Tasso: From Public Duty to Private Pleasure. University of Toronto Press.
- da Oriolo, Giovanni. Leonello d’Esta (Portrait) 1447, The National Gallery. Trafalgar Square, London WC2N 5DN, United Kingdom. Visited: 23 March 2015. http://www.nationalgallery.org.uk/
- Dean, Trevor (2002). Land and Power in Late Medieval Ferrara: The Rule of the Este, 1350–1450. Cambridge University Press.
- Ferrara, City of the Renaissance, and Its Po Delta. UNESCO World Heritage Centre. Retrieved from https://whc.unesco.org/en/list/733 on 26 March 2015.
- Fry, Roger (1911). "A Portrait of Leonello d'Este by Roger van der Weyden". The Burlington Magazine for Connoisseurs. 18 (94): 200–202.
- Grendler, Paul F. The Universities of the Italian Renaissance, Baltimore: The Johns Hopkins University Press, 2002.
- Hourihane, Colum (2012). The Grove Encyclopedia of Medieval Art and Architecture. Oxford University Press.
- James, Carolyn. "Machiavelli in Skirts." Isabella d'Este and Politics. Netherlands: Springer, 2007.
- Kantorowicz, Ernst. "The Este Portrait by Roger van der Weyden." Journal of the Warburg and Courtauld Institutes 3, no. 3 – 4 (1940): 165 – 180.
- Lockwood, Lewis. Leonello's rule, 1441–50; the court chapel. England: Oxford University Press, 2009.
- Lockwood, Lewis (2009). Renaissance Ferrara 1400–1505: The Creation of a Musical Center in the Fifteenth Century. Oxford University Press.
- Pisanello, Antonio di Puccio. Cast bronze medal of Leonello d’Este Marchese of Ferrara (Medal) 1441, The British Museum. Great Russell Street London WC1B 3DG, United Kingdom. Visited: 9 February 2015. https://www.britishmuseum.org/
- Pisanello, Antonio di Puccio. Leonello d’Este (Medal) 1444, Victoria and Albert Museum. Cromwell Road, London SW7 2RL, United Kingdom. Visited: 7 February 2015. http://www.vam.ac.uk/.
- Pisanello, Antonio di Puccio. Bust of Leonello, Marquess of Este (Medal) 1450, Victoria and Albert Museum. Cromwell Road, London SW7 2RL, United Kingdom. Visited: 7 February 2015. http://www.vam.ac.uk/.
- Shephard, Tim. Echoing Helicon: Music, Art and Identity in the Este Studioli, 1440–1530, United Kingdom: Oxford University Press, 2014.
- Tavernor, Robert. On Alberti and the Art of Building, Yale University Press, 1999.
- Tuohy, Thomas. Herculean Ferrara: Ercole D'Este (1471–1505) and the Invention of a Ducal Capital. England: Cambridge University Press, 2002.

| Preceded by Niccolò III | Marquess of Ferrara; Modena and Reggio; 1441–1450 | Succeeded by Borso |
