= Niccolò III d'Este =

Marquis of Ferrara (1383–1441)

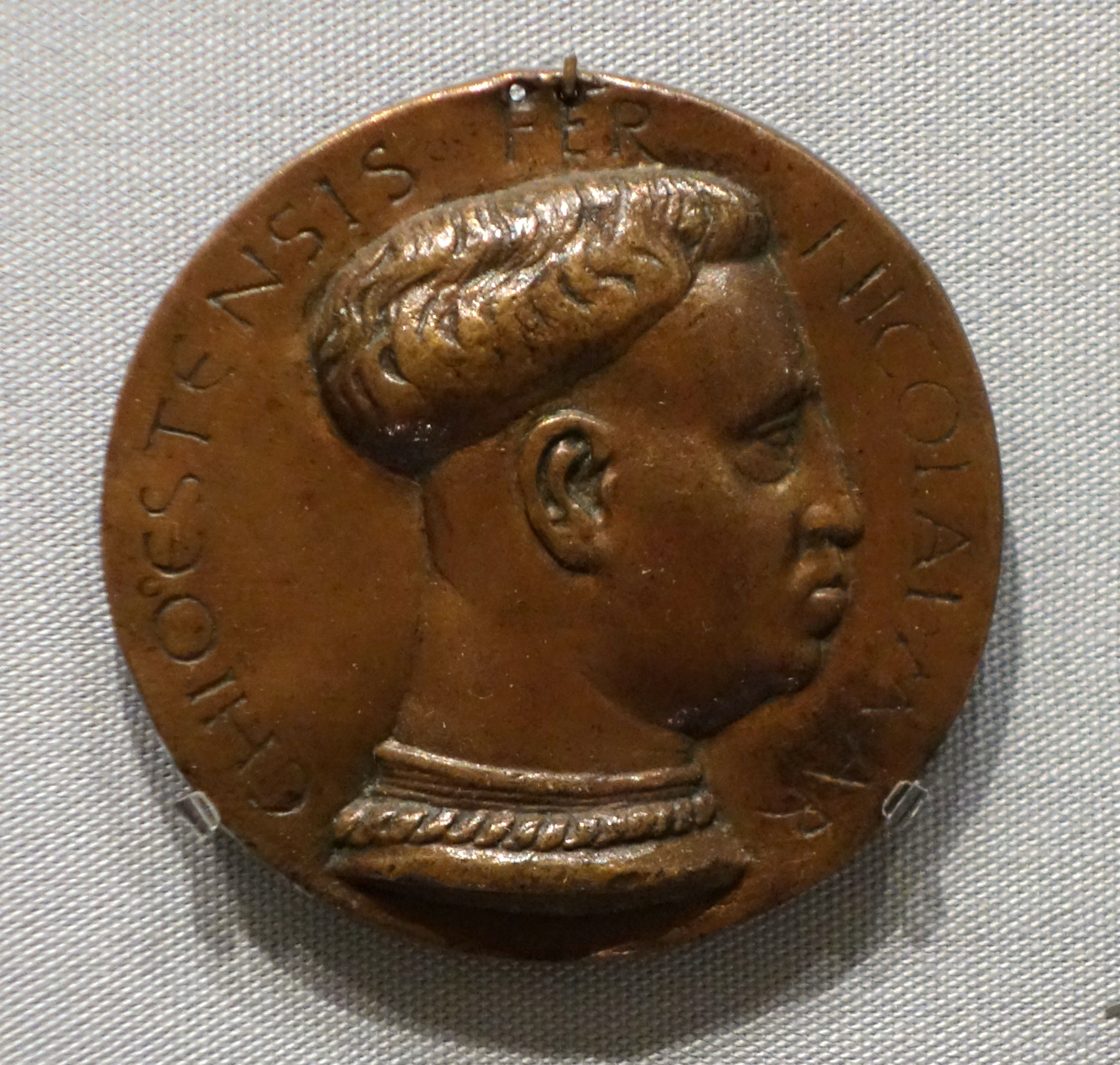
- Medal attributed to Amadio da Milano, after 1431 or c. 1441
- Born: 9 November 1383; Commune of Ferrara
- Died: 26 December 1441 (aged 58); Milan, Duchy of Milan
- Noble family: Este
- Spouses: Gigliola da Carrara; Parisina Malatesta; Ricciarda of Saluzzo
- Issue: Ugo; Leonello; Borso; Ercole
- Father: Alberto d'Este
- Mother: Isotta Albaresani

Niccolò III d'Este (9 November 1383 – 26 December 1441) was Marquess of Ferrara from 1393 until his death. He was also a condottiero.

== Biography ==
Born in Ferrara on 9 November 1383, Niccolo was the son of Alberto d'Este and Isotta Albaresani. He inherited the rule of the city in 1393 when only 10 years old. As a minor he was guided by a Regency Council supported by the Republics of Venice, Florence and Bologna.

Niccolò's uncle Azzo X d'Este, a descendant of Obizzo II d'Este, contested Niccolò's right to rule in Ferrara due to his illegitimate birth, even though Niccolò had been legitimated by his father. In 1395 Azzo invaded Ferrara with a mercenary army, but was defeated and captured in the Battle of Portomaggiore by the troops of the Regency Council.

In 1397 Niccolò married Gigliola da Carrara, daughter of Francesco II da Carrara, lord of Padua.

In 1403 he joined the league formed against Gian Maria Visconti, Duke of Milan, being appointed Captain General of the Papal Army by Pope Boniface IX. In 1405 he ceded the ancestral family lands near Este to Venice.

In 1410, the fencing master Fiore dei Liberi dedicated his treatise Fior di Battaglia to him. In 1413 he made a pilgrimage to the Holy Land. In 1418 he remarried, to Parisina Malatesta, daughter of Andrea Malatesta. Two years later, fearing the ambitions of Filippo Maria Visconti, he ceded Parma to him.

In 1425 Niccolò had both his wife Parisina and his illegitimate son Ugo executed on charges of adultery, and also decreed that all women within his domains found to be guilty of adultery were to be put to death. He had to rescind this order once it was determined that this action would depopulate Ferrara. In that year he was again commander-in-chief of the anti-Visconti league. In 1429, he named his illegitimate son Borso as heir of the Marquisate.

The role of Niccolò as a prestigious leader in Italy was confirmed when his city was chosen as the seat of the Council of Ferrara in 1438.

== Marriages and children ==
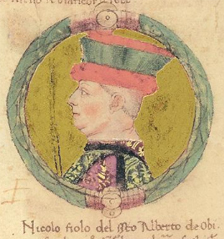
Niccolò III in the Genealogia dei principi d'Este (1470s)

Niccolò had children with at least eleven different women.

Niccolo married first Gigliola da Carrara, daughter of Francesco II da Carrara, lord of Padua in June 1397. She died of the plague in 1416. They had no known children.

Niccolo married secondly Parisina Malatesta, daughter of Andrea Malatesta. He had her executed on 21 May 1425 for allegedly having an affair with his illegitimate son Ugo d'Este. They had:

- Ginevra d'Este (24 March 1419 – 12 October 1440). Married her maternal relative Sigismondo Pandolfo Malatesta.
- Luzia d'Este (24 March 1419 – 28 June 1437). Married Carlo Gonzaga of Milan, Lord of Sabbioneta.
- Alberto Carlo d'Este (born and deceased in 1421).

He married thirdly Ricciarda of Saluzzo in 1429. She was a daughter of Thomas III of Saluzzo and Marguerite of Pierrepont. They had two children:

- Ercole I d'Este (26 October 1431 – 15 June 1505)
- Sigismondo d'Este (1433 – 1 April 1507)

He also had 12 illegitimate children:

- Ugo d'Este (1405–1425). Son by Stella de' Tolomei. Executed by his father on 21 May 1425 for allegedly having an affair with his stepmother Parisina Malatesta
- Meliaduse d'Este, Abbot of Pomposa and Ferrara, (1406–1452). Son by Caterina di Taddeo.
- Leonello d'Este (1407–1450). Son by Stella de' Tolomei.
- Margherita d'Este (1411–1452). Married Galeotto Roberto Malatesta (1411–1432). Married Galassio II Pio.
- Borso d'Este (1413–1471). Son by Stella de' Tolomei.
- Alberto d'Este (1415 – 8 April 1502). Son by Filippa della Tavola.
- Isotta d'Este (1425–1456). Daughter by Filippa della Tavola. Married first Oddantonio da Montefeltro, Duke of Urbino and secondly Stjepan III Frankopan Modruški (Stephen Frangipani), Prince of Krk, Senj and Modruš
- Beatrice d'Este (1427–1497). Married in her first marriage to Niccolò of Correggio, and in her second marriage Tristano Sforza son of Francesco Sforza
- Rinaldo d'Este, Lord of Ostellato (c. 1435 – 1535). Son by Anna de Roberti.
- Bianca Maria d'Este (18 December 1440 – 12 January 1506). Daughter by Anna de Roberti. Married Galeotto I Pico, Lord della Mirandola.
- Gurone d'Este (d. 1484). An Abbot.
- Camilla d'Este. Married Rodolfo da Varano of Camerino.

== Sources ==
- Bartlett, Kenneth R. (2013). A Short History of the Italian Renaissance. University of Toronto Press.
- Giunta, Claudio (2002). Versi a un destinatario: saggio sulla poesia italiana del Medioevo (in Italian). Il mulino.
- Kohl, Benjamin G. (1998). Padua Under the Carrara, 1318-1405. Johns Hopkins University Press. ISBN 9780801857034.
- Zaho, Margaret Ann (2004). Imago Triumphalis: The Function and Significance of Triumphal Imagery for Italian Renaissance Rulers. Peter Lang. ISBN 9780820462356.

Niccolò III d'Este House of Este Born: 9 November 1383 Died: 26 December 1441
Preceded by Alberto	Marquess of Ferrara; 1393–1441	Succeeded by Leonello
