= March of Ancona =

Administrative subdivision of the Papal States (1210-1798)

March of Ancona Marca Anconitana
- 1100–1798
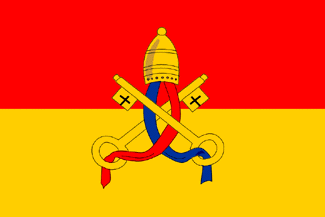
- Flag

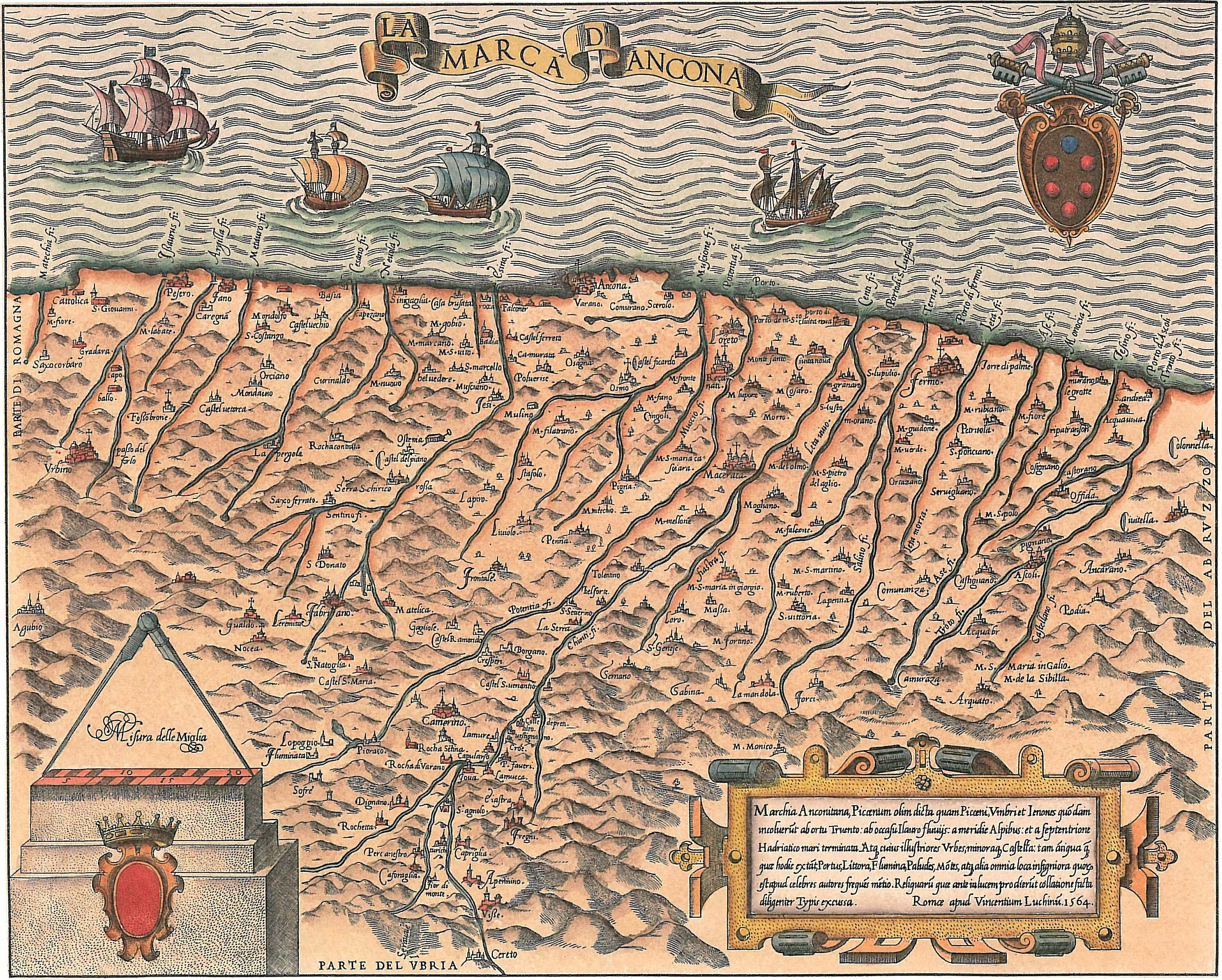
- The march in a map of 1564 by Vincenzo Luchino.
- Status: March of the Kingdom of Italy (1100–1198); Territory of the Papal States (1198–1798)
- Capital: Ancona (until 1210); Fermo (1210–15th century); Macerata (15th century–1798)
- Religion: Roman Catholicism
| Preceded by | Succeeded by |
| Duchy of Spoleto; Republic of Ancona | Anconine Republic; Roman Republic (18th century) |

The March of Ancona (Italian: Marca Anconitana or Anconetana) was a frontier march centred on the city of Ancona and later Fermo then Macerata in the Middle Ages. Its name is preserved as an Italian region today, the Marche, and it corresponds to almost the entire modern region and not just the Province of Ancona.

== History ==
Originally part of Imperial Italy, the march was constituted around 1100 from the March of Fermo and a southern portion of the Byzantine Pentapolis. Initially the new march took the name of its first ruler: marca Guarnerii or march of Werner. There were disputes between the Empire and the Church over rights and jurisdiction in the March. In 1173, an imperial army under Christian of Mainz invaded the March against pro-papal resistance led by Countess Boltruda Frangipani. In 1177, Pope Alexander III referred to it as "partly belonging to the empire but largely to the church".

The march was definitely acquired by the Papal States during the pontificate of Innocent III in the year 1198. It was initially governed by a papal nominee called a rector. The rector of Ancona, like the rectors of other papal provinces, was under the authority of a general rector reporting directly to the pope. Under the papacy, the March had three towns of over 10,000 people: Ancona, Ascoli Piceno and Fermo.

The province was reorganized by the Constitutiones Sanctæ Matris Ecclesiæ in 1357. The march followed the Adriatic as far north as Urbino and contained the cities of Loreto, Camerino, Fermo, Macerata, Osimo, San Severino, and Tolentino

From the late Middle Ages onward, however, the effective administration of many towns in the March of Ancona was largely exercised by local urban elites organized in hereditary patriciates. The popes came to rely on these local aristocracies, seeing them as essential for maintaining peace, preserving social order, and ensuring the regular collection of taxes.

According to Paul Sabatier's biography of St. Francis of Assisi, "The Road to Assisi", the March of Ancona became the home of the spiritual Franciscans after Francis' death.

== Rulers ==
- Werner (1093–1109)
- Conrad of Lützelhard (1177– )
- Markward von Annweiler (1184–1202)

== Marquess ==
=== House of Este ===
The line of "Marquesses of Este"("Marchesi d'Este") rises in 1039 with Albert Azzo II, Margrave of Milan. The name "Este" is related to the city where the family came from, Este. The family was founded by Adalbert the Margrave. who might have been the true first Margrave of Milan of this family. In 1209 Azzo VI is named the first "Marquess of Ferrara", and the title passed to his descendants, and Este Marquisate's was delegated to a cadet branch of the family. Later, were also created the Marquisates of Modena and Reggio.

| Ruler | Born | Reign | Death | Consort | Notes |
|---|---|---|---|---|---|
| Azzo VI | c.1170 | 1209-1212 | November 1212 | Sofia Aldobrandini; 1189 two children Sophia (Eleonora) of Savoy before 1192 one child Alix of Châtillon; 22 February 1204 two children | Son of Azzo V. In 1209 was made the first Marquess of Ferrara. |
| Aldobrandino I | c.1190 | 1212-1215 | 10 October 1215 | Unknown; Before 1215 three children | Son of Azzo VI and Sofia |
| Azzo VII Novello | c.1205 | 1212-1264 | 16 February 1264 | Giovanna of Puglia; 1225 five children Mabilia Pallavicini; 1238 no/two children | Son of Azzo VI and Alix |
| Obizzo II | 1247 or 1252 | 1264-1293 | 20 January or 13 February 1293 | Jacopina (Fieschi) of Lavagna; 1263 three children Constance (della Scala) of Verona; 1289 two children | Grandson of Azzo VII, as bastard son of Azzo's son, Rinaldo. |
| Azzo VIII | After 1263 | 1293-1308 | 31 January 1308 | Giovanna Orsini; September 1282 three children Beatrice of Sicily; April 1305 no children | Son of Obizzo II. |
| Francesco I | c. or after 1289 | 1293-1312 | 23 August 1312 | Orsina Orsini four children | Son of Obizzo II. |
| Aldobrandino II | ? | 1293-1326 | 26 July 1326 | Alda Rangoni; 1289 four children | Co-ruled with his sons and nephews, following a pro-Este revolt in Ferrara. |
| Rinaldo | ? | 1326-1335 | 31 December 1335 | Lucrezia di Barbiano one child | Co-ruled with his brothers and cousins, following a pro-Este revolt in Ferrara. |
| Niccolò I | ? | 1326-1344 | 1 May 1344 | Beatrice of Mantua; 21 April 1335 no children | Co-ruled with his brothers and cousins, following a pro-Este revolt in Ferrara. |
| Obizzo III | 14 July 1294 | 1326-1352 | 20 March 1352 | Jacopa Pepoli; May 1317 no children Filippa Ariosti (lover until 1347); 27 November 1347 ten children (legitimated 1347) | Co-ruled with his brothers and cousins, following a pro-Este revolt in Ferrara. |

=== House of Sforza ===
- Francesco I Sforza (1434–1443).

== Bibliography ==
- Calasso, Francesco; Pivano, Silvio (1934). "Marca e marchesi". Enciclopedia Italiana. Vol. 22. Istituto dell'Enciclopedia Italiana.
- Partner, Peter (1972). The Lands of St. Peter: The Papal State in the Middle Ages and the Early Renaissance. University of California Press.
