= Francesco d'Este (died 1312) =

Italian ruler of Ferrara in 1308–1309 (died 1312)

- Lord of Ferrara
- Francesco d'Este, depicted in the Genealogia dei principi d'Este
- Tenure: 1308–1309
- Predecessor: Fresco d'Este
- Successor: Aldobrandino II d'Este
- Noble family: House of Este
- Spouse: Orsina Orsini
- Issue: Azzo IX d'Este, Bertoldo I d'Este
- Father: Obizzo II d'Este
- Mother: Giacomina Fieschi

Francesco d'Este (died 1312) was lord of Ferrara in 1308–1309. He was the son of Obizzo II d'Este and ruled briefly, between his illegitimate nephew Fresco d'Este and his older brother Aldobrandino II d'Este, with a period of Papal rule between his own reign and his brother's (1309–1317). Francesco's authority was largely nominal, since control of Ferrara was at first divided between the Papacy and Venice, then effectively exercised by papal representatives.

== Biography ==
Francesco d'Este was a legitimate son of Obizzo II d'Este, Lord of Ferrara and Modena, but scholars have been divided on whether he was born by Obizzo's first wife Giacomina (Jacopina) Fieschi (d. 1287), niece of Pope Adrian V, or by his second, Costanza della Scala, daughter of Alberto I della Scala of Verona, whom he had married in 1289. If he is the son invested with his father's lands in the territories of Padua and Vicenza in 1282, Francesco must have been a son of Giacomina Fieschi. He had several siblings — Maddalena, who married Aldobrandino Turchi and then Ranieri di Canossa, Azzo VIII d'Este, Aldobrandino II d'Este, and Beatrice d'Este, as well as the illegitimate Matteo, Francesco, and Rinaldo.

Francesco supported Azzo VIII against their ambitious brother Aldobrandino II, who sought to take over Modena in the 1290s with help from Padua and Verona. In 1295, Azzo VIII and Francesco were knighted at Treviso. Francesco remained loyal to Azzo until 1304, when Azzo married Beatrice of Naples, and explicitly excluded Francesco from the succession. Until this point, with the exile of Aldobrandino II, Francesco had had reasonable hopes of inheriting Azzo as ruler of Ferrara and Modena in the absence of legitimate heirs. With the marriage treaty concluded and Beatrice arriving at Ferrara, Francesco left the city, rebelled against his brother, and seized Lendinara with help from Padua. Attacked in turn by Azzo, Francesco held out at Lendinara for a year, until he was betrayed by Albertuccio Zacco and forced to flee. He continued to oppose Azzo and raid his territory, in alliance with exiles from Modena exiles and Reggio Emilia, and the cities of Parma, Brescia, and Bologna, a league designed to curtail Azzo in 1306. The league helped terminate Azzo's authority over Modena, Reggio, Ficarolo, and Bergantino. The renewed league was joined by Ravenna in 1307, but suffered setbacks at the hands of Azzo.

When Azzo VIII died on 31 January 1308, he was succeeded in accordance with his will by his young grandson Folco, the son of Azzo's eldest illegitimate son Francesco (Fresco) d'Este. Francesco and his older brother Aldobrandino II now contested this succession, claiming that Fresco and his son were excluded by reason of the former's illegitimacy and that they had reconciled to their brother Azzo VIII and secured their right to inherit him in another will. Bolstered by an alliance with Bologna and later Venice, Fresco was able to maintain himself in charge of Ferrara.

While Aldobrandino II retired to Bologna, his sons Rinaldo and Obizzo joined their uncle Francesco in attacking Ferrara's possessions with Paduan aid, capturing the fortresses of Fratta Polesine and Arquà Polesine. Despite this and a subsequent setback, Fresco was able to turn the tide of the conflict once reinforcements from Bologna and Venice arrived to help him. He recovered Fratta easily, and besieged Francesco and his nephews at Arquà. This soon fell, and Francesco and his nephews departed. By March 1308, Fresco appeared to have consolidated his position as effective ruler of Ferrara, while his uncle Francesco lost the support of Padua, which now befriended Fresco.

Although humiliated, Francesco, continued to claim Ferrara for himself and now appealed for intervention and support to his notional feudal suzerain, Pope Clement V, then resident at Avignon. The Pope, perhaps anxious to recover more effective overlordship or control over Ferrara, hastened to intervene. On 27 April, he issued bulls naming his Cardinal Arnaud de St-Astier, and his chaplain, Onofrio de Trebis, papal legates to Italy and to Ferrara in particular, and demanded the local population obey them. This coincided with a rise in popular sentiment against Fresco, due to his submission to the demands of Venice for the fulfillment of long-deferred obligations. An initial revolt against Fresco in Ferrara was quashed, however, with new help from Bologna.

By August, the papal legates reached Bologna and proceeded to build a local coalition, including — apart from the Papacy and Francesco d'Este — Bologna, Cervia, Cremona, Mantua, and Ravenna, to force papal authority on Ferrara. Padua, which had previously supported Francesco against Fresco, held aloof for the time being. Francesco's hopes of success increased, as his nephew's were dashed. Hostilities broke out in September. Francesco, once more supported by Padua, took Rovigo. Shortly after, the papal legate Onofrio de Trebis reached Ferrara and, since he could gain no admittance into the city, read out a warning of a papal ban and interdict from outside the Gate of San Giorgio. Fresco failed to obtain support from anyone but Venice, yet was unwilling to meet Venetian demands that he surrender Ferrara to them in exchange for a life pension. By the beginning of October, he was faced by a revolt of Ferrara's citizens, retreated to the castle (Castello Tedaldo) and Upper Town, and the people of Ferrara opened the gates to Onofrio de Trebis and the forces of the papal coalition. Fresco, isolated in his stronghold, eventually ceded his rights to Venice and established himself there with his family.

The conflict between the papal coalition and the Venetians continued until 1 December 1308, when a peace was concluded, whereby Ferrara's territory was divided between Venice and the Papacy, which retained nominal control of the town. The agreement turned out null and void, because the Pope would not endorse it continued the war effort. In May 1309, the Pope appointed as a new legate his nephew, Cardinal Arnaud de Pellegrue, who inflicted a succession of defeats on the Venetians and forced them to abandon their positions in and near Ferrara. In this context, Francesco d'Este, who had joined the papal forces and made a valuable contribution to the victory, was recognized as the legitimate ruler of Ferrara, entered the city in triumph alongside Cardinal Arnaud de St-Astier in 1308, and was formally installed by Cardinal Arnaud de Pellegrue in 1309. Even so, effective control of the city remained in the hands of the papal representatives.

But Francesco's triumph turned out to be brief. He soon fled amid the continuing tensions among the populace, which accepted direct rule by the Papacy in January 1310. The heavy-handed behavior of the papal vicar-general, however, resulted in a massacre, which occasioned a revolt in June 1310, harshly suppressed by the Cardinal. In July 1310, Francesco d'Este and his nephews Rinaldo and Obizzo came to the aid of the papal representatives, who had been forced to barricade themselves in the Castello Tedaldo by the rioting populace. Allied with the Pope against Emperor Henry VII, Francesco d'Este was nevertheless treated with suspicion by the papal authorities. In the end, he was killed by papal troops during a scuffle in an attempt to arrest him outside the city gates on 23 August 1312. This resulted in further popular unrest. Pope Clement V now entrusted Ferrara to King Robert of Naples, who conducted an investigation that proved Francesco d'Este to have been innocent on 18 November 1313; his children were therefore restored their confiscated assets. Nevertheless, the Neapolitans caused further opposition and unrest, culminating in a popular revolt which overthrew the Neapolitan governor and garrison in August 1317 and restored Este rule over Ferrara, in the persons of Francesco's brother Aldobrandino II and his three sons.

== Descendants ==
By his wife Orsina Orsini, Francesco d'Este had four children.

- Azzo IX d'Este (d. 1317)
- Bertoldo I d'Este (d. 1343), co-Lord of Ferrara 1317–1343, ancestor of a cadet line of the family, extinct in 1463
- Jacopina d'Este, m. Enrico Scrovegni
- Giovanna d'Este, m. Simone Guidi, Count of Battifolle

== Bibliography ==
- Chiappini, Luciano. Gli Estensi: mille anni di storia. Ferrara, 2001.
- Battioni, Gianluca, "Este, Francesco d'," in Dizionario Biografico degli Italiani 43 (1993). available online
- Bertolini, Paolo. "Este, Fresco d'," in Dizionario Biografico degli Italiani 43 (1993). available online
- Menache, Sophia. Clement V. Cambridge, 1998.
- Mollat, Guillaume. The Popes at Avignon, 1305–1378. New York, 1963.
- Moressa, Pierluigi. Gli Estensi: Storia di una grande dinastia. Santarcangelo di Romagna, 2024.

Preceded by Fresco d'Este	Lord of Ferrara; 1308–1309	Succeeded by Aldobrandino II d'Este
