= Azzo VIII d'Este =

Italian lord of Ferrara, Modena and Reggio from 1293 (died 1308)

Azzo VIII d’Este
- Lord of Ferrara, Modena, and Reggio
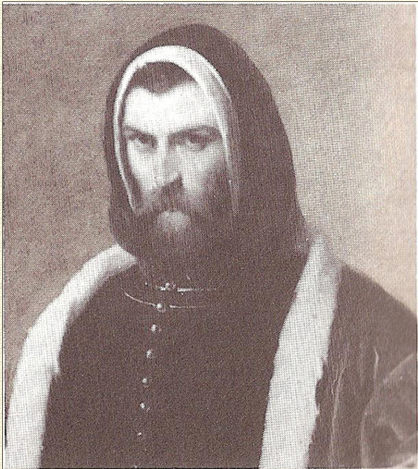
- Tenure: 1293–1308
- Predecessor: Obizzo II d'Este
- Successor: Aldobrandino II d'Este
- Noble family: House of Este
- Spouses: Giovanna Orsini; Beatrice of Naples
- Issue: Fresco d'Este
- Father: Obizzo II d'Este
- Mother: Giacomina Fieschi

Azzo VIII, depicted in the Genealogia dei principi d'Este

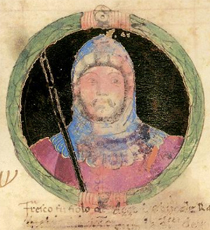
Azzo's son, Fresco d'Este depicted in the Genealogia dei principi d'Este

Azzo VIII d'Este (died 31 January 1308) was lord of Ferrara, Modena and Reggio from 1293 until his death. He was the son of Obizzo II and Giacomina (Jacopina) Fieschi, a niece of Pope Adrian V.

== Biography ==
Born sometime soon after 1263 (when his parents married), Azzo VIII had a younger full brother Aldobrandino II d'Este and sister Beatrice, and a younger half-brother Francesco d'Este, as well as illegitimate half-brothers Matteo, Francesco, and Rinaldo. In January 1293, Azzo VIII inherited the family possessions from his father Obizzo II, whom he had murdered, according to Dante in the Inferno. The Florentine poet calls him a half-son, but it is not clear if to stress Azzo's bad acts or if he was truly illegitimate. The murder may have been carried out with the connivance of Azzo VIII's younger brother(s), who at first recognized his authority. A potential to divide the family possessions among the brothers, with Ferrara passing to Azzo VIII, Modena to Aldobrandino II, and Reggio Emilia to Francesco, did not materialize.

Azzo VIII involved himself with the politics of Northern Italy, starting with a war against Padua at his accession. The cooperation among the Este brothers quickly broke down and Aldobrandino II unsuccessfully attempted to seize Modena, then went on to Padua, inciting it to a new conflict with his brother Azzo VIII. This had turned into a chaotic wider conflict in 1295–1299, into which had intervened various neighboring powers, including Verona, Bologna, and Parma among Azzo's opponents. He was accused of the assassination of the podestà of Bologna, Jacopo del Cassero (d. 1298), who had opposed Este expansion. Treviso backed Azzo VIII and his brother Francesco, conferring knighthoods on them 1295. Azzo VIII finally made peace at somewhat disadvantageous terms, accepting the arbitration of Florence and Pope Boniface VIII.

The peace held briefly, Azzo VIII allying with Cremona and Mantua to fight Milan and Verona. In 1300, however, Azzo VIII's sister Beatrice, widowed of her first husband, the Guelph Nino Visconti of Pisa (d. 1296), Judge of Gallura in Corsica, married the Ghibelline Galeazzo I Visconti (d. 1328), later Lord of Milan. This improved relations with Milan, while tensions continued with Bologna during a period of peace.

A few years after the death of his first wife Giovanna Orsini in 1300, Azzo VIII made a bargain to marry the 9-year-old Beatrice of Naples, the youngest daughter of King Charles II of Naples, in 1304. This transaction was notorious in his day and among chroniclers afterwards: Dante asserted that Charles "was seen to sell his own daughter and to bargain over her as corsairs do over slaves." The nuptial agreement survives in the Este archives: Azzo granted his father-in-law 51,000 florins, to be invested in lands in the Regno and in appropriate places in the marquisate of Este, and promised to establish primogeniture in the Este holdings, contrary in fact to Estense traditions, and explicitly disinheriting Azzo's younger brother Francesco. The wedding was duly solemnized.

Opposition mounted immediately, even among Azzo's family, subjects, and allies. Modena and Reggio rebelled in 1306 over an attempt to assign them to Beatrice as part of the bride price, a custom that had been superseded in Italy by the dowry. Francesco d'Este left Ferrara as Beatrice arrived, rebelled, and joined the coalition of cities (including Verona, Parma, Padua, Bologna, and Mantua) that moved against Azzo in 1306. The allies occupied Modena and Reggio, while Francesco seized Lendinara with help from Padua. Azzo responded by coming to terms with Bologna and seeking the support of Pietro Gradenigo, the Doge of Venice. Venetian intervention had the desired effect of buoying Azzo and Ferrara, but required Azzo to accept the presence of a Venetian representative. In failing health, Azzo VIII had little time to enjoy his relative success. He sought remedy at the thermal springs in Paduan territory, but failed to improve, dying at Este on 31 January 1308.

== Succession ==
Azzo VIII bequeathed his lands to his grandson Folco, the son of Azzo's illegitimate son Francesco (Fresco). On account of Folco's young age, his father Fresco assumed the regency. All this was opposed by Fresco's uncles, Aldobrandino II and Francesco, who approached Pope Clement V for support and investiture with Ferrara. Fresco called in Venetian support, while the Pope declared war on Venice over Ferrara. The Pope's nephew, Cardinal Arnaud de Pellegrue, was dispatched as Legate to Italy from the papal court at Avignon, and proceeded to march on Ferrara with the support of the communities through which he passed. The terrified populace ejected Fresco and his son Folco, who found refuge in Venice in 1308, while Cardinal Arnaud drove out the Venetians and installed Francesco d'Este as the new ruler of Ferrara in 1309. Francesco himself fled amid the continuing tensions, only to be killed while trying to return to power in 1312. Fresco and Folco died in their Venetian exile about the same time. The War over Ferrara between Venice and the Papacy ended with papal victory, and Ferrara remained under papal authority until 1317.

== Descendants ==
Azzo VIII d'Este left no surviving legitimate children from his marriages to Giovanna Orsini (1282, d. 1300) and then Beatrice of Naples (who was only 9 years old at the time of their marriage in 1304). Azzo nevertheless had illegitimate issue, as follows.

- Francesco (called Fresco) d'Este, regent of Ferrara for a few months in 1308 on behalf of his son Folco, d. 1312
- Rizzardo (Riccardo) d'Este, who married Lucrezia, daughter of Nicola, Count of Barbiano
- Pietro, abbot
- Costanza, who married Lambertino, son of Venedico dell'Orso, called Caccianemico (d. 1302)

== Sources ==
- Chiappini, Luciano. Gli Estensi: mille anni di storia. Ferrara, 2001.
- Dean, Trevor. "Este, Azzo d'," in Dizionario Biografico degli Italiani 43 (1993). available online
- Hyde, John Kenneth (1966). Padua in the Age of Dante. Manchester University Press. ISBN 9781597400695.
- Menache, Sophia (2003). Clement V. Cambridge: Cambridge University Press. p. 142. ISBN 978-0521521987.
- Moressa, Pierluigi. Gli Estensi: Storia di una grande dinastia. Santarcangelo di Romagna, 2024.

Preceded by Obizzo II	Ruler of Ferrara; 1293–1308	Succeeded by Fresco
