= Niccolò II d'Este =

Italian noble (1338–1388)

Niccolò II d'Este, Marquis of Ferrara
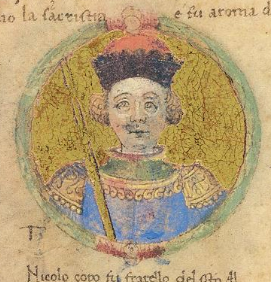
- Niccolò depicted in the Genealogia dei principi d'Este (1470s)
- Born: 1338
- Died: 26 March 1388 (aged 49–50)
- Occupations: Lord of Ferrara, Modena and Parma
- Years active: 1361–1388
- Known for: Commissioned Castello Estense
- Spouse: Verde della Scala

Niccolò II d'Este (1338 – 26 March 1388) was Lord of Ferrara, Modena and Parma from 1361 until his death.

He was the son of Obizzo III, who had ruled in Ferrara from 1317 to 1352 and the noblewoman Lippa degli Ariosti. After inheriting his lands from Aldobrandino III, he allied with Padua, Verona and Mantua against Bernabò Visconti and, after a meeting at Viterbo, he managed to obtain also the support of Pope Urban V (1367).

During Niccolò's reign, Ferrara started to gain a reputation as an art city. He commissioned to Bartolino da Novara the construction of the Castello Estense after a popular revolt in 1385.

== Marriage ==
On 19 May 1362 Niccolo was married to Verde della Scala, daughter of Mastino II della Scala and sister of Beatrice della Scala, making him a brother-in-law of the powerful Bernabó Visconti.

They had one daughter;

- Taddea d´Este (1365 – 23 November 1404) who married Francesco II da Carrara, the last lord of Padua and had issue.

== Sources ==
- Hyde, John Kenneth (1966). Padua in the Age of Dante. Manchester University Press. ISBN 9781597400695.
- Geddes, Helen (2012). "Este, (1) Niccolo II d'Este". In Hourihane, Colum (ed.). The Grove Encyclopedia of Medieval Art and Architecture. Vol. 1. Oxford University Press. pp. 474, 475. ISBN 978-0-19-539536-5.
- Antonio Menniti Ippolito, Este, Niccolò II d’, in Dizionario Biografico degli Italiani, XLIII, Roma 1993, pp. 393–396

Preceded by Aldobrandino III	Marquess of Ferrara; 1361–1388	Succeeded by Alberto
