= Fresco d'Este =

Italian regent of Ferrara in 1308 (died 1312)

Francesco (Fresco) d'Este
- Regent of Ferrara
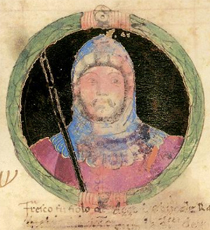
- Tenure: 1308, as regent for son
- Predecessor: Azzo VIII d'Este
- Successor: Francesco d'Este
- Noble family: House of Este
- Spouse: Pellegrina Caccianemici
- Issue: Folco d'Este
- Father: Azzo VIII d'Este
- Mother: ?

Francesco (Fresco) d'Este (died 1312) was regent of Ferrara for a few months in 1308, on behalf of his underage son Folco d'Este. He was the eldest illegitimate son of Azzo VIII d'Este.

== Biography ==
Francesco (Fresco) d'Este was the illegitimate son of Azzo VIII d'Este, Marquis of Ferrara, by an unnamed mistress. He had three siblings or half-siblings, all likewise illegitimate, Costanza (wife of Lambertino Caccianemico), Rizzardo (husband of Lucrezia da Barbiano), and the abbot Pietro. The first mention of Fresco comes from 1304 when, together with his father Azzo VIII, he was made an honorary Venetian citizen at Venice. By 1307, he had married a member of the influential and friendly Caccianemici family, Pellegrina. The two had at least one son, Folco d'Este, among other, unnamed children.

In January 1306, Fresco came to the aid of his father's lieutenant Manfredino da Sassuolo, who was faced with a revolt at Modena. Defeated, Fresco was besieged and captured at the local castle. Later, he was freed in a prisoner exchange between Modena and his father in 1307. When Azzo VIII retired to Albano in the territory of Padua to seek a cure at the local thermal springs, Fresco was left in charge of Ferrara. Despite this, probably on account of Fresco's illegitimate birth, his ailing father named Fresco's young son Folco as his primary heir, setting aside generous legacies for his second wife Beatrice of Naples. When Azzo VIII died on 31 January 1304, his grandson Folco duly succeeded him as ruler of Ferrara, under the regency or guardianship of his father Fresco, who was already in possession of the city, and with the formal acknowledgement of the municipal authorities.

This development was opposed by Fresco's uncles, Azzo VIII's younger brothers Aldobrandino II and Francesco, who declared their nephew and great-nephew illegitimate and laid claim to the inheritance, also citing a supposed second will in which they had been reconciled to their brother and recognized as his heirs. At this point, Fresco's position was bolstered against his uncles by Bologna. His uncles sought and received the support of Padua and attempted, unsuccessfully, to keep Venice from aiding Fresco. While Aldobrandino II retired to Bologna, his sons Rinaldo and Obizzo joined their uncle Francesco in attacking Ferrara's possessions with Paduan aid, capturing the fortresses of Fratta Polesine and Arquà Polesine. Fresco reacted energetically, calling on Bologna and Venice for military support and dispatching a force under his lieutenants Bastardino d'Este and Rinaldo, Count of Marcaria. These, however, were defeated by a sortie at Fratta — Bastardino fell in the fighting, while Rinaldo was taken prisoner. Nevertheless, Fresco was able to turn the tide of the conflict once reinforcements from Bologna and Venice arrived. Supported by a riverine fleet from Ferrara, he recovered Fratta easily, and took Arquà (where Francesco and his nephews had sought refuge) after a short siege. Thus, by March, Fresco had consolidated his position as effective ruler of Ferrara, and had initiated a rapprochement with former enemies like Bologna (now an ally), Verona, and Mantua. On the failure of Francesco d'Este, even his supporter Padua abandoned his cause and befriended Fresco.

Despite this success, Fresco's position proved tenuous. His humiliated uncle, Francesco, now appealed to the notional feudal suzerain of Ferrara, Pope Clement V, then resident at Avignon, to recognize his claims and grant him investiture. The Pope, perhaps anxious to recover more effective overlordship or control over Ferrara, hastened to intervene. On 27 April, he issued bulls naming his Cardinal Arnaud de St-Astier, and his chaplain, Onofrio de Trebis, papal legates to Italy and to Ferrara in particular, and demanded the local population obey them. This coincided with a rise in popular sentiment against Fresco, due to his submission to the demands of Venice for the fulfillment of long-deferred obligations. An initial revolt against Fresco in Ferrara was quashed, however, with new help from Bologna. Venice, meanwhile, began to prepare for a possible war to safeguard her newly-gained influence in Ferrara.

By August, the papal legates reached Bologna and called on Fresco to submit voluntarily and on Venice to not interfere. Suspecting, correctly, that their demands would be rejected, the legates proceeded to build a local coalition, including — apart from the Papacy and Francesco d'Este — Bologna, Cervia, Cremona, Mantua, and Ravenna, to force papal authority on Ferrara; the cities joined the Papacy in part because of fear that Venice would turn Ferrara into an advance base along the Po. Padua, which had previously supported Francesco against Fresco, held aloof. But that was not enough to help secure the position of Fresco, who was now abandoned by his former ally Bologna and had incurred the hatred of his subjects in Ferrara itself. Venice forbade Fresco from cooperating with the papal coalition.

The hostilities broke out in September. Francesco d'Este, once more supported by Padua, took Rovigo. Shortly after, the Legate Onofrio de Trebis, reached Ferrara and, since he could gain no admittance into the city, read out a warning of a papal ban and interdict from outside the Gate of San Giorgio. Fresco searched frantically for allies, appealing in vain to his sympathizers at Bologna, and seeking immediate reinforcements from Venice. Venice sent him troops and betrayed its ambition of obtaining Ferrara by offered Fresco a life pension if he would turn over Ferrara to the Venetians. Fresco was not prepared to concede this much, and hoped for another way out. By the beginning of October, however, he lost control over public order and was faced by a revolt of Ferrara's citizens. On the night of 2–3 October, Fresco had to retreat to the castle (Castello Tedaldo) and Upper Town, from which he was able to counter the papal force's attempt to take over the rest of the city. But after the formal excommunication of Fresco and of his Venetian allies was declared on 4 October, the people of Ferrara deserted him entirely, and on the night of 5–6 October opened the gates to Onofrio de Trebis and the forces of the papal coalition.

Now encircled in the castle and Upper Town, Fresco once more sought assistance from his sympathizers in Bologna, to no avail. On 10 October, seeing no alternative, he formally ceded his rights to Ferrara to the Republic of Venice and turned over to it the Castello Tedaldo. By November, Fresco, his son Folco, and his other relatives, were established in Venice, although they did not receive the promised pension until after January 1309.

Meanwhile, the papal coalition was on the verge of falling apart due to rivalry among the allies (Bernardino da Polenta of Ravenna forcing his acceptance as podestà of Ferrara), and the Venetians managed to cut off river communications and supplies to the enemy. The Legate Arnaud de St-Astier attempted to secure the Venetian retreat through diplomacy, only to be met with abuse; he declared Venice excommunicated again on 20 October 1308, which only exacerbated the conflict. Inflicting heavy losses on the papal coalition and the citizens of Ferrara from their strongholds, the Venetians obtained a favorable peace on 1 December 1308, whereby Ferrara's territory was divided between them and the Papacy, which retained nominal control of the town. The agreement turned out null and void, because on 4 December, unawares of it, the Pope had demanded Venice to abandon its holdings in and claims on Ferrara. The Ferrarese and their neighbors were thus not bound by the treaty, and the Pope continued to threaten Venice. In May 1309, the Pope appointed as a new legate his nephew, Cardinal Arnaud de Pellegrue, who arrived in Lombardy with 2000 men and picked up large reinforcements from nearby communities, preaching a Crusade against the Venetians. Pope Clement V ordered all Venetians living abroad to be arrested and their property confiscated in June 1309. In August and September the Venetians suffered a succession of defeats and had to abandon their positions in and near Ferrara. Despite these reverses and heavy consequences, Venice held out against the Pope until King Philip IV of France mediated a peace in 1309. The offered surrender of Fresco d'Este proved insufficient to appease the Pope, and in 1313 the peace treaty was finalized, including Venice's abandonment of any of the claims it had received from Fresco, and assuming financial responsibility for the cost of the war.

Fresco's uncle Francesco d'Este was installed by Cardinal Arnaud de Pellegrue as the new ruler of Ferrara in 1309. He soon fled amid the continuing tensions among the populace, which accepted direct rule by the Papacy in January 1310. The heavy-handed behavior of the papal vicar-general, however, resulted in a massacre, which occasioned a revolt in June 1310, harshly suppressed by the Cardinal. When Francesco d'Este returned in 1312, he was murdered by papal troops, which once again excited the populace. The potential reaction in favor of the Este could not be exploited by Fresco and his son, as they died in their Venetian exile at about the same time. Pope Clement V now entrusted Ferrara to King Robert of Naples, whose representatives caused further opposition and unrest. This culminated in a popular revolt which overthrew the Neapolitan governor and garrison in August 1317 and restored Este rule over Ferrara, in the persons of Fresco's uncle Aldobrandino II and his three sons.

== Bibliography ==
- Chiappini, Luciano. Gli Estensi: mille anni di storia. Ferrara, 2001.
- Bertolini, Paolo. "Este, Fresco d'," in Dizionario Biografico degli Italiani 43 (1993). available online
- Mollat, Guillaume. The Popes at Avignon, 1305–1378. New York, 1963.
- Moressa, Pierluigi. Gli Estensi: Storia di una grande dinastia. Santarcangelo di Romagna, 2024.

| Preceded by Azzo VIII d'Este | Regent of Ferrara; 1308 | Succeeded by Francesco d'Este |
