= Francesco d'Este =

Francesco d'Este may refer to:

- Francesco d'Este (died 1312), son of Obizzo II, brother of Azzo VIII and Aldobrandino II
- Francesco d'Este (1325–1384), son of Bertoldo I d'Este
- Francesco d'Este (1516–1578) son of Alfonso I d'Este and Lucrezia Borgia
- Francesco I d'Este, Duke of Modena (1610–1658), son of Alfonso III d'Este
- Francesco II d'Este, Duke of Modena (1660–1694), son of Alfonso IV d'Este
- Francesco III d'Este, Duke of Modena (1698–1780), son of Rinaldo d'Este
- Francis IV, Duke of Modena (1779–1886), son of Ferdinand Karl, Archduke of Austria–Este
