= Rinaldo d'Este =

Rinaldo d'Este may refer to:

- Rinaldo d'Este (1221-1251) (1221–1251), son of Azzo VII d'Este
- Rinaldo d'Este (1618-1672) (1618–1672), cardinal between 1641 and 1672
- Rinaldo d'Este (1655–1737) (1655 – 1737), Duke of Modena, cardinal between 1686 and 1694
