= Rinaldo II d'Este =

Rinaldo II d’Este
- Lord of Ferrara
- Tenure: 1317-1335
- Predecessor: Aldobrandino II d'Este
- Successor: Aldobrandino III d'Este
- Born: 1290; Ferrara
- Died: 31 December 1335 (aged 45)
- Noble family: House of Este
- Spouses: Lucrezia di Barbiano; Orsolina Macaruffi
- Issue: Beatrice; Azzo; Giacoma; Aldobrandino
- Father: Aldobrandino II d'Este
- Mother: Alda Rangoni

Rinaldo II d'Este (Ferrara, c. 1290 – Ferrara, December 31, 1335) was an Italian nobleman, politician, and condottiero.

== Biography ==
He was the son of Aldobrandino II d'Este, Lord of Ferrara, and Alda Rangoni.

He lived in Ferrara until 1317, a time when the city was governed by the vicar of King Robert of Anjou, King of Naples. On July 17, 1317, the populace rose up against the rulers—whom they viewed as invaders—forcing their militias to abandon the city. The House of Este was acclaimed as the new ruling family, and Rinaldo assumed power over the city. This provoked the wrath of Pope John XXII, as a city that had been granted in vicariate by the Papal States had rebelled. Rinaldo attempted, in vain, to secure recognition from the Pope; failing in this endeavor, he proceeded to expel the bishops from their sees in Ferrara, Comacchio, and Adria, and to plunder the furnishings from the churches. The Pope excommunicated him, but in the meantime, in 1324, Rinaldo d'Este obtained the investiture of his territories from Louis the Bavarian; the Pope responded by launching a crusade against the House of Este.

In 1325, he fought alongside the Ghibellines in the Battle of Zappolino, with the aim of seizing control of Bologna. In 1327, he attended the coronation of Louis the Bavarian as King of Italy in Milan; Louis subsequently arranged for the election of the Antipope Nicholas V, who was excommunicated by John XXII in April 1329. The Este family, too, declared themselves opposed to the Antipope; this paved the way for a reconciliation with Pope John XXII, who—via a papal bull issued from Avignon—lifted the excommunications previously imposed upon the House of Este, granting Ferrara to the three brothers—Rinaldo, Nicolò, and Obizzo III d'Este—to hold as a papal vicariate. He subsequently forged treaties of friendship with both the Gonzaga—the new lords of Mantua, who had risen to power in 1328 following the expulsion of the Bonacolsi—and the Della Scala, the lords of Verona.

In 1322, he laid siege to Modena but was defeated. This outcome prompted Cardinal Bertrand du Pouget, the Papal Legate, to lay siege to Ferrara in February 1333. On this occasion, the Bolognese forces advanced right up to the city walls; however, Rinaldo launched a sortie, routed the attackers, and secured a crushing victory. The besiegers suffered over two thousand casualties. Furthermore, Rinaldo II succeeded in taking numerous prisoners, including Lippo II Alidosi of Imola, Francesco I Manfredi of Faenza, two nephews of Ramberto I Malatesta of Forlì (Ramberto himself escaped capture only by fleeing and swimming across the River Po), and the Count of Armagnac) Many of the prisoners were subsequently used in an exchange to secure the release of Niccolò d'Este, who had fallen captive to the forces of Bologna.

His final military undertaking was the conquest of Modena in June 1335; however, he was unable to obtain the investiture due to an infirmity that led to his death on December 31 of that same year.

== Descendants ==
Rinaldo's first marriage was to Lucrezia, daughter of Nicola, Count of Barbiano. For his second marriage, he wed Orsolina Macaruffi of Padua (died 1362); they had a single daughter, Beatrice (died 1339), who married Giacomo of Savoy-Achaea (James I), Prince of Piedmont (1315–1367).

Rinaldo had three children:

- Azzo (1332–1371), a military man
- Giacoma
- Aldobrandino (1325–1381), Bishop of Modena
