= Duke of Ferrara and of Modena =

Ducal office

Duke of Modena
- Flag of the Duchy of Modena under the Este family

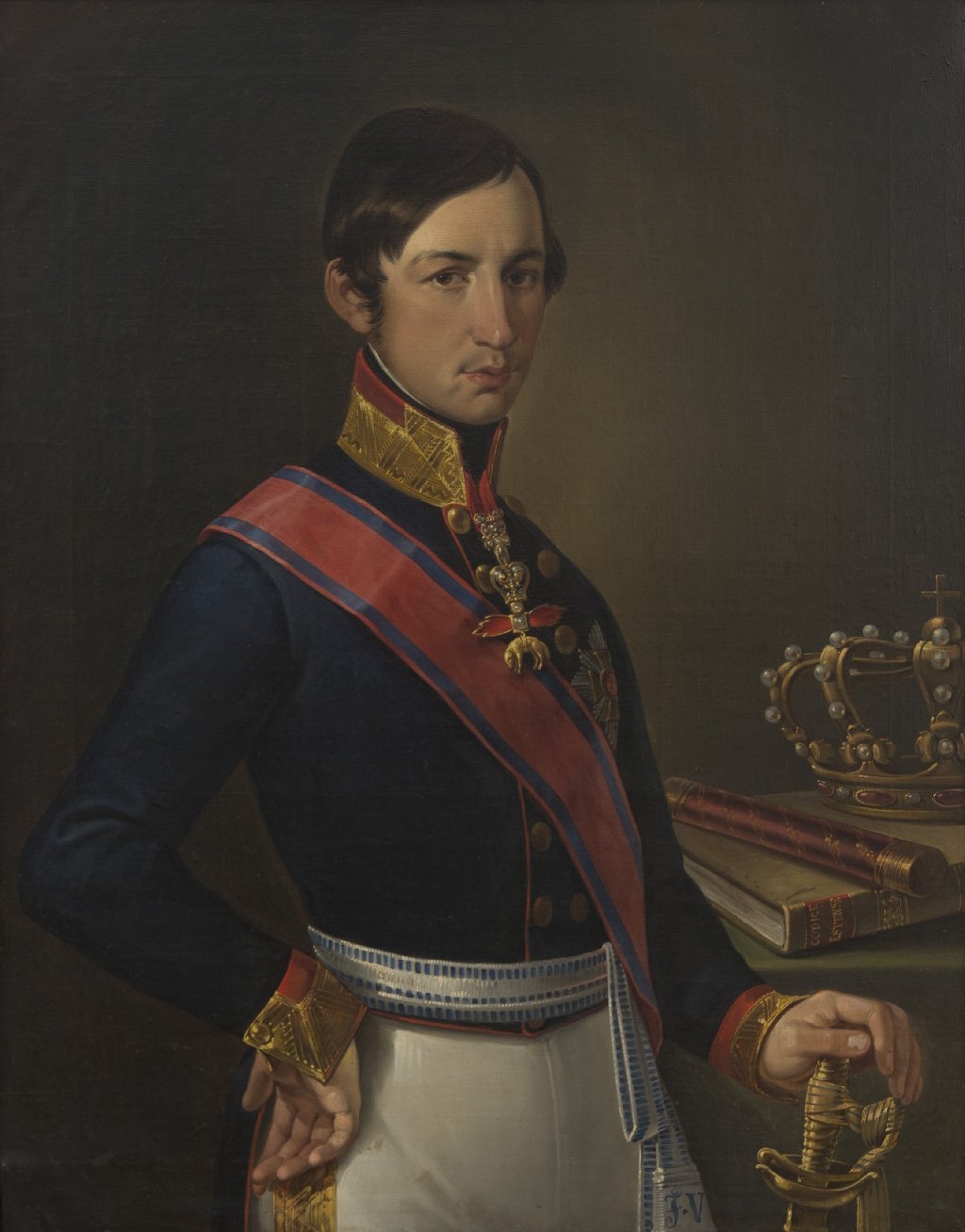
- Francis V, Duke of Modena

Details
- Style: Imperial and Royal Highness
- First monarch: Borso d'Este, Duke of Ferrara
- Last monarch: Francis V, Duke of Modena
- Formed: 1452
- Abolished: 1859
- Pretenders: Prince Lorenz of Belgium, Archduke of Austria-Este

This is a list of rulers of the estates owned by the Este family, which main line of Marquesses (Marchesi d'Este) rose in 1039 with Albert Azzo II, Margrave of Milan. The name "Este" is related to the city where the family came from, Este.

== From the Lordship of Este to the Duchy of Ferrara-Modena-Reggio ==
The family was founded by Adalbert the Margrave, who might have been the true first margrave of Milan of this family. In 1209, Azzo VI was named the first marquess of Ferrara. The title passed to his descendants, and the marquisate was delegated to a cadet branch of the Este family. Later, they were also created marquesses of Modena and Reggio.

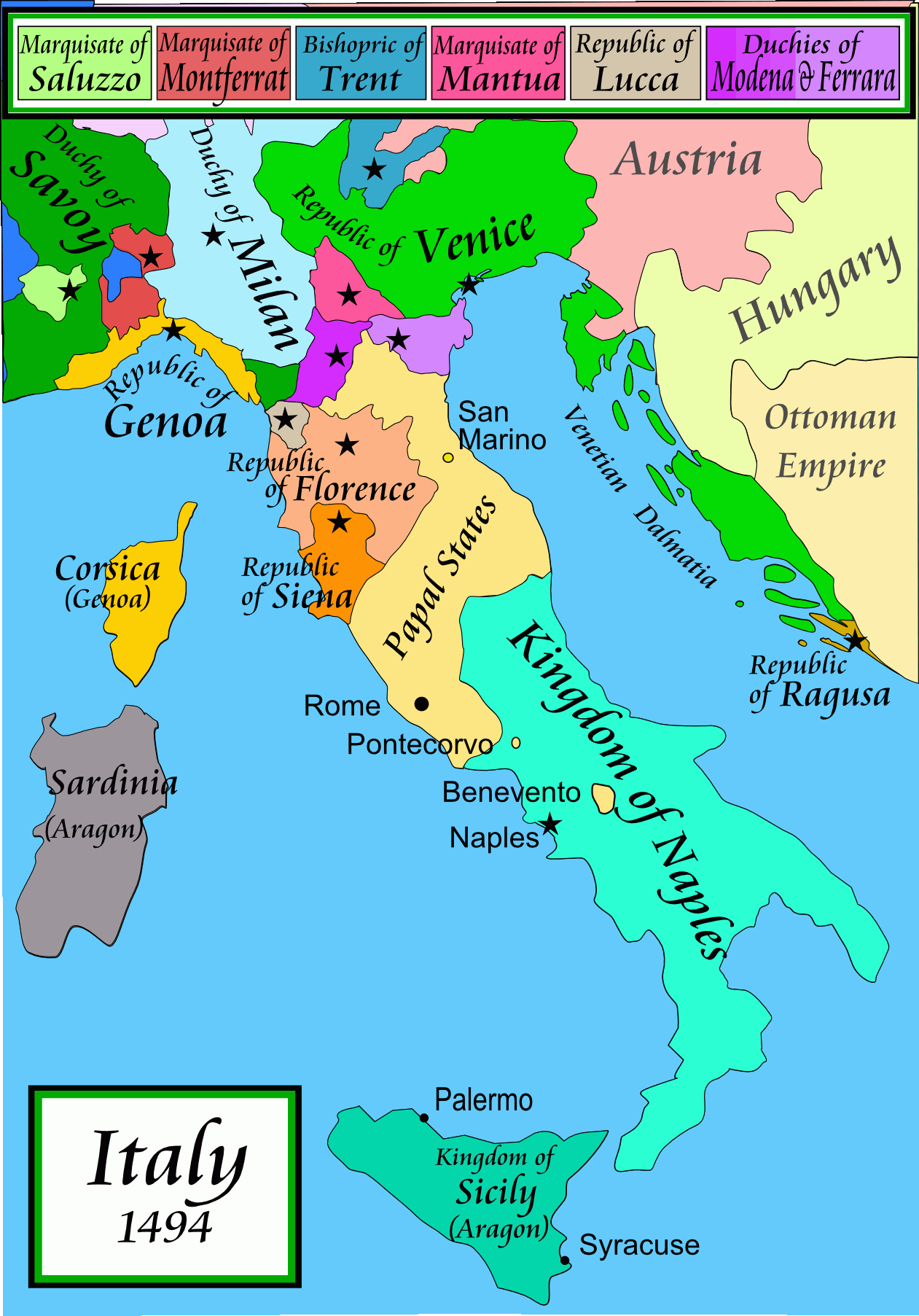
The Duchy of Modena (in the dark purple) and of Ferrara (in the light purple) in the context of late 15th century Italy.

First coat of arms of the family

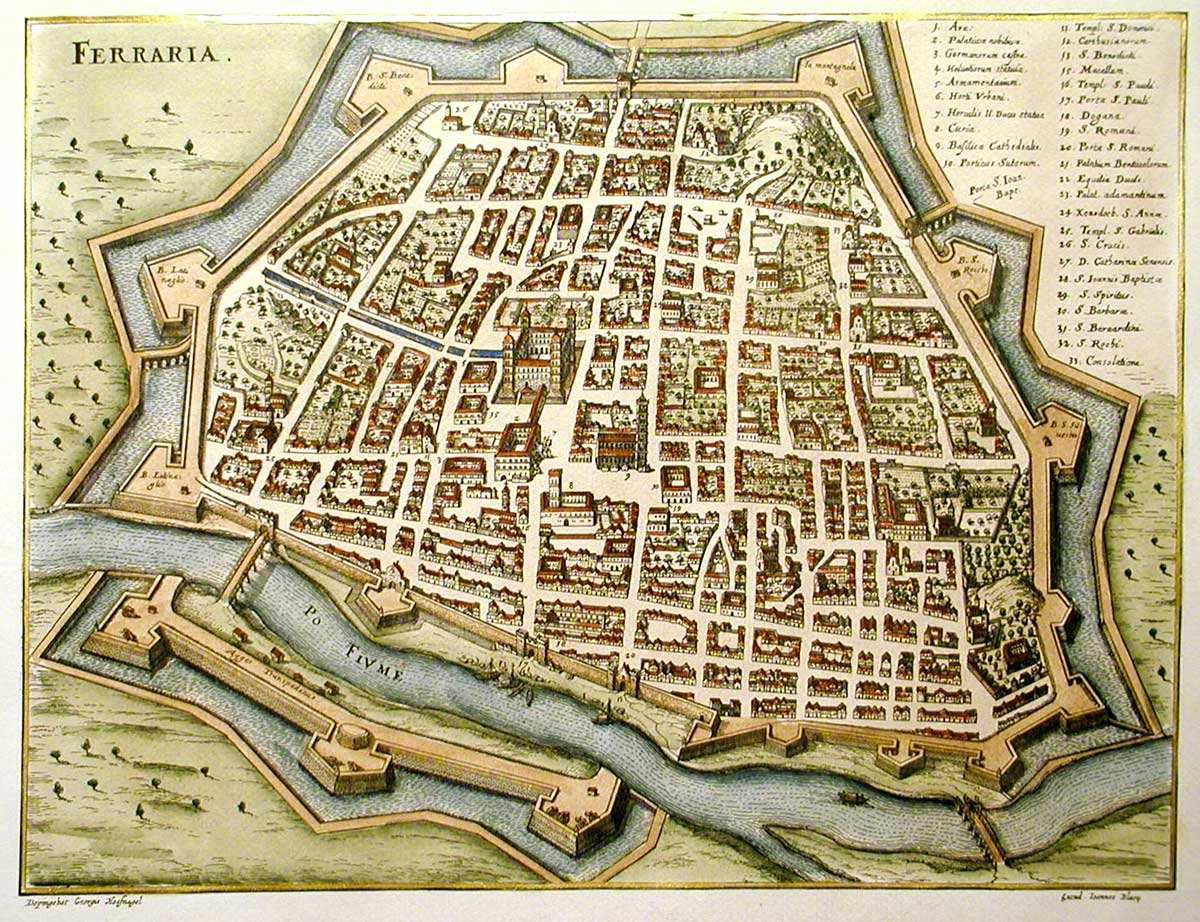
A map of Ferrara at the time of its loss by the Este family, c.1600

In 1452 Borso d'Este, then marquis of Modena and Reggio, was raised by Emperor Frederick III with the title of duke of Modena and Reggio. In 1471, Pope Paul II formally elevated him in as Duke of Ferrara, over which the family had in fact long presided.

This latter territory was lost to the Papal States in 1597, while the House of Este continued to rule the Duchy of Modena and Reggio in the Emilia region until 1796, when it became part of Napoleon Bonaparte's Cispadane Republic. In 1814, the duchy was restored under the Habsburg grandson of the last Este duke, continuing until it was annexed by Piedmont-Sardinia in 1859.

== Rulers ==
=== House of Este ===
==== Partitions of Este territories under Este rule ====
Marquisate of Este (940–1463) (acquired Ferrara 1187, recovered 1240); (acquired Modena 1288; and Reggio 1289)	Marquisate of Modena (1st creation) (1293–1361)
Marquisate of Ferrara (1293–1308)	Reggio to Papal States (1306–1405)
Modenese Republic (1308–1336)	Ferrara to Papal States (1308–1317)
Marquisate of Ferrara (1317–1405)
Marquisate of Modena (2nd creation) (1336–1361)
Marquisate of Modena, Ferrara and Reggio (1405–1471)
Raised to: Duchy of Modena, Ferrara and Reggio (1471–1597) (lost Ferrara 1597)
Ferrara lost to Papal States 1597
Marquisate of San Martino in Rio (1490–1757)	Marquisate of Montecchio (1st creation) (1562–1587)
Marquisate of Lanzo (1592–1652)
Marquisate of Scandiano (1643–1725)	Marquisate of Montecchio (2nd creation) (1638–1713)
Marquisate of Dronero (1653–1734)	Marquisate of Borgomanero (1652–1734)
Dronero inherited by Birago di Vische family

==== Table of rulers ====
Ruler	Born	Reign	Ruling part	Consort	Death	Notes
Adalbert the Margrave	c.910 ?	c.940 – 951	Lordship of Este (part of the March of Milan)	Unknown	951 aged 40–41?	Ruler of the Eastern March (or March of Milan), and founder of the Obertenghi family, direct ancestor to the House of Este.
Oberto I	c.930 Son of Adalbert	951 – 15 October 975	Lordship of Este (part of the March of Milan)	Willa of Spoleto seven children	15 October 975 aged 44–45	Also Marquis of Milan. A son of his was the founder of the Malaspina family.
Oberto II	c.950 Sons of Oberto I and Willa of Spoleto	15 October 975 – 1014	Lordship of Este (part of the March of Milan)	Railenda six children	1014 aged 63–64	Also Marquesses of Milan. The sons of Alberto I were the ancestors of the Pallavicini family.
Alberto I	c.950 Sons of Oberto I and Willa of Spoleto	15 October 975 – 1002	Lordship of Este (part of the March of Milan)	Unknown three children	1002 aged 51–52	Also Marquesses of Milan. The sons of Alberto I were the ancestors of the Pallavicini family.
Ugo	c.970 First son of Oberto II and Railenda	1014	Lordship of Este (part of the March of Milan)	Unmarried	(26 January) 1035; Piacenza aged 64–65	Also Marquis of Milan, and Count of Padua and Vicenza. Deposed in the same year of accession.
Alberto Azzo I (Alberto II Azzo I)	c.970 Second son of Oberto II and Railenda	1014–1029	Lordship of Este (part of the March of Milan)	Adela one child	1029 aged 58–59	Also Marquis of Milan.
Alberto Azzo II (Alberto III Azzo II)	997; Modena; Son of Alberto Azzo I and Adela	1029 – 20 August 1097	Lordship of Este Raised to: Marquisate of Este	Kunigunde of Altdorf; 1036 one child Garsenda of Maine c.1050 two children Vitalia Orseolo one child	20 August 1097; Vangadizza aged 99–100?	First ruler to be known as Marquis of Este. Also Marquis of Milan, and the founder of the House of Este. His son from his first wife, Welf IV, is the ancestor of the House of Welf.
Folco I	c.1050? Son of Alberto Azzo II and Garsenda of Maine	20 August 1097 – December 1128	Marquisate of Este	Unknown six children	15/22 December 1128; Vangadizza aged 87–88 or 100–101	Also Marquis of Milan. Referenced as titular, because, after Alberto Azzo II's death, the lands of the family were partitioned between the various branches of the family (including Malaspinas and Pallavicinis).
Azzo III	c.1080 Sons of Ugo d'Este, Count of Maine and Heria of Hauteville	December 1128 – c.1142	Marquisate of Este (with Lordship of Ferrara since 1187)	Aichiva one child	c.1142 aged 61–62	Nephews of Folco, referenced in documents as marchese, proving, along with Azzo's numbering, that they may have co-ruled with their cousins.
Tancredo	c.1080 Sons of Ugo d'Este, Count of Maine and Heria of Hauteville	December 1128 – c. 1145	Marquisate of Este (with Lordship of Ferrara since 1187)	Unknown	c.1145 aged 64–65	Nephews of Folco, referenced in documents as marchese, proving, along with Azzo's numbering, that they may have co-ruled with their cousins.
Azzo IV	c.1100? Sons of Folco I	December 1128 – c. 1154	Marquisate of Este (with Lordship of Ferrara since 1187)	Unknown	c.1154 aged 53–54?	Sons of Folco I, ruled jointly and with their cousins Azzo III and Tancredo. Obizzo I was the first lord of Ferrara and the last Marquess of Milan of the family. Obizzo also associated to his rule his son Azzo V and his nephew Bonifazio II.
Bonifazio I	c.1100? Sons of Folco I	December 1128–c.1165	Marquisate of Este (with Lordship of Ferrara since 1187)	Unknown two children	c.1165 aged 64–65?	Sons of Folco I, ruled jointly and with their cousins Azzo III and Tancredo. Obizzo I was the first lord of Ferrara and the last Marquess of Milan of the family. Obizzo also associated to his rule his son Azzo V and his nephew Bonifazio II.
Folco II	c.1100? Sons of Folco I	December 1128 – 1178	Marquisate of Este (with Lordship of Ferrara since 1187)	Unknown one child	1178 aged 77–78?	Sons of Folco I, ruled jointly and with their cousins Azzo III and Tancredo. Obizzo I was the first lord of Ferrara and the last Marquess of Milan of the family. Obizzo also associated to his rule his son Azzo V and his nephew Bonifazio II.
Alberto IV	c.1100? Sons of Folco I	December 1128 – 1184	Marquisate of Este (with Lordship of Ferrara since 1187)	Matilda two children	1184 (after 10 April) aged 83–84?	Sons of Folco I, ruled jointly and with their cousins Azzo III and Tancredo. Obizzo I was the first lord of Ferrara and the last Marquess of Milan of the family. Obizzo also associated to his rule his son Azzo V and his nephew Bonifazio II.
Obizzo I	c.1100? Sons of Folco I	December 1128 – 25 December 1193	Marquisate of Este (with Lordship of Ferrara since 1187)	Unknown one child Sofia Lendinara five children	25 December 1193 aged 92–93?	Sons of Folco I, ruled jointly and with their cousins Azzo III and Tancredo. Obizzo I was the first lord of Ferrara and the last Marquess of Milan of the family. Obizzo also associated to his rule his son Azzo V and his nephew Bonifazio II.
Azzo V	c. 1135; Son of Obizzo I and Sofia Lendinara	c.1140–1190	Marquisate of Este (with Lordship of Ferrara since 1187)	Marchesella Adelardi; 1120 two children	c.1190 Ferrara aged 54–55?	Sons of Folco I, ruled jointly and with their cousins Azzo III and Tancredo. Obizzo I was the first lord of Ferrara and the last Marquess of Milan of the family. Obizzo also associated to his rule his son Azzo V and his nephew Bonifazio II.
Bonifazio II	c.1130? Son of Folco II	1178–1190	Marquisate of Este (with Lordship of Ferrara since 1187)	Unknown	1190 aged 59–60?	Sons of Folco I, ruled jointly and with their cousins Azzo III and Tancredo. Obizzo I was the first lord of Ferrara and the last Marquess of Milan of the family. Obizzo also associated to his rule his son Azzo V and his nephew Bonifazio II.
Azzo VI	c. 1170; Ferrara; Son of Azzo V and Marchesella Adelardi	25 December 1193 – November 1212	Marquisate of Este (with Lordship of Ferrara )	Sofia Aldobrandini; 1189 two children Sophia of Savoy before 1192 one child Alice of Châtillon; 22 February 1204 two children	November 1212; Verona aged 41–42	Also Marquis of Ancona since 1209. In that year, the lordship of Ferrara was raised to a Marquisate.
Aldobrandino I	c. 1190; Ferrara; Son of Azzo VI and Sofia Aldobrandini	November 1212 – 10 October 1215	Marquisate of Este (with Lordship of Ferrara)	Unknown; Before 1215 three children	10 October 1215; Ancona aged 24–25	Died prematurely, but with children. However, he was succeeded by his minor half-brother.
Regencies of Alice of Châtillon, Alberto da Baone, and Tisone da Camposampiero (1215–1219)						In 1222, Azzo was deposed of Ferrara by Salinguerra II Torelli, but recovered the city in 1240. Azzo VII raised two of the children of his half-brother, one of them being Saint Contardo of Este.
Azzo VII Novello	c.1205 Ferrara; Son of Azzo VI and Alice of Châtillon	10 October 1215 – 16 February 1264	Marquisate of Este (with Lordship of Ferrara in 1215–1222 and since 1240)	Giovanna Puglia; 1221 four children Amabilia Pallavicini; 1238 no/two children	16 February 1264; Apulia aged 58–59	In 1222, Azzo was deposed of Ferrara by Salinguerra II Torelli, but recovered the city in 1240. Azzo VII raised two of the children of his half-brother, one of them being Saint Contardo of Este.
Occupation of Ferrara by Salinguerra II Torelli (1222–1240)
Obizzo II	1247; Ferrara; Bastard son of Rinaldo d'Este	16 February 1264 – January/February 1293	Marquisate of Este (with Lordship of Ferrara; with Lordships of Modena since 1288 and Reggio since 1289)	Jacopina Fieschi; 1263 three children Costanza della Scala; 1289 two children	20 January or 13 February 1293; Ferrara aged 45–46	Grandson of Azzo VII, as bastard son of Azzo's son, Rinaldo. Between 1288 and 1289 he achieved the joining of the communes of Modena and Reggio to the Este's lands. After his death the lands were partitioned between his sons.
Azzo VIII	c.1265 Ferrara; Son of Obizzo II and Jacopina Fieschi	January/February 1293 – 31 January 1308	Marquisate of Este (1/3, with Lordship of Ferrara)	Giovanna Orsini; September 1282 three children Beatrice of Sicily; April 1305 no children	31 January 1308; Este aged c.42–43	Children of Obizzo II. Initialliy Obizzo had recognized solely Azzo as his heir, but in April 1293 his sons made a new division of the inheritance. In 1306, Francesco was expelled from Reggio, and, similarly, Aldobrandino was expelled from Modena. In 1308, not long after Azzo's death, Ferrara also expelled the family form government. With only the Este marquisate remaining in their hands, in 1317, the family organized a pro-Este revolt in Ferrara, and restored their rule in that city, where they officialized a co-rulership. Aldobrandino may have also stepped down from Este, where his nephews Azzo and Bertoldo held complete control from then on.
Aldobrandino II	c.1265 Ferrara; Son of Obizzo II and Jacopina Fieschi	January/February 1293 – 1317	Marquisate of Este (1/3, with Lordship of Modena until 1306)	Alda Rangoni; April 1305 no children	26 July 1326; Bologna aged c.60–61	
Aldobrandino II	c.1265 Ferrara; Son of Obizzo II and Jacopina Fieschi	1317 – 26 July 1326	Lordship of Ferrara	Alda Rangoni; April 1305 no children	26 July 1326; Bologna aged c.60–61	
Francesco I	c. 1290; Ferrara; Son of Obizzo II and Costanza della Scala	January/February 1293–23 August 1312	Marquisate of Este (1/3, with Lordship of Reggio until 1306)	Orsina Orsini four children	23 August 1312; Ferrara aged 22–23	
Modenese Republic (1306–1336)
Reggio occupied by the Papal States (1306–1405)
Regency of Fresco d'Este (1308)						Barred from succession (despite Ferrara wanting him to succeed his father), Fresco d'Este was appointed regent for his own son Folco, the designated heir of Azzo VIII. Fresco tried to appeal to the Papal States to regain his place, but Ferrara ended up temporarily absorbed by the Papal army.
Folco II	c.1300? Ferrara; Son of Fresco d'Este and Pellegrina Caccianemici	31 January – October 1308	Lordship of Ferrara	Unknown	c.1315 Venice ged 14–15	Barred from succession (despite Ferrara wanting him to succeed his father), Fresco d'Este was appointed regent for his own son Folco, the designated heir of Azzo VIII. Fresco tried to appeal to the Papal States to regain his place, but Ferrara ended up temporarily absorbed by the Papal army.
Ferrara occupied by the Papal States (1308–1317)
Rinaldo	c.1290? Ferrara; First son of Aldobrandino II and Alda Rangoni	1317 – 31 December 1335	Lordship of Ferrara (with Lordship of Modena since 1336)	Lucrezia Barbiano one child	31 December 1335; Ferrara aged 44–45?	Following a pro-Este revolt in Ferrara, the sons of Aldobrandino II (Rinaldo, Niccolò, Obizzo) and Francesco I (Azzo and Bertoldo) ascended together. Bertoldo and Azzo IX, Francesco's sons, kept all Este for themselves (while retaining co-rulership in Ferrara which was abandoned by their children), and Niccolò and Obizzo, while keeping Ferrara, also recovered Modena.
Niccolò I	c.1290? Ferrara; Second son of Aldobrandino II and Alda Rangoni	1317– 1 May 1344	Lordship of Ferrara (with Lordship of Modena since 1336)	Beatrice Gonzaga; 21 April 1335 no children	1 May 1344; Ferrara aged 53–54?	Following a pro-Este revolt in Ferrara, the sons of Aldobrandino II (Rinaldo, Niccolò, Obizzo) and Francesco I (Azzo and Bertoldo) ascended together. Bertoldo and Azzo IX, Francesco's sons, kept all Este for themselves (while retaining co-rulership in Ferrara which was abandoned by their children), and Niccolò and Obizzo, while keeping Ferrara, also recovered Modena.
Obizzo III	14 July 1294; Ferrara; Third son of Aldobrandino II and Alda Rangoni	1317– 20 March 1352	Lordship of Ferrara (with Lordship of Modena since 1336)	Jacopa Pepoli; May 1317 no children Filippa Ariosto (lover until 1347); 27 November 1347 ten children (legitimized 1347)	20 March 1352; Ferrara aged 57	Following a pro-Este revolt in Ferrara, the sons of Aldobrandino II (Rinaldo, Niccolò, Obizzo) and Francesco I (Azzo and Bertoldo) ascended together. Bertoldo and Azzo IX, Francesco's sons, kept all Este for themselves (while retaining co-rulership in Ferrara which was abandoned by their children), and Niccolò and Obizzo, while keeping Ferrara, also recovered Modena.
Azzo IX	c.1300 Sons of Francesco I and Orsina Orsini	1317–24 June 1318	Marquisate of Este (with Lordship of Ferrara)	Tomasina Cattanei di Lusia no children	24 June 1318; Ferrara aged 17–18	Following a pro-Este revolt in Ferrara, the sons of Aldobrandino II (Rinaldo, Niccolò, Obizzo) and Francesco I (Azzo and Bertoldo) ascended together. Bertoldo and Azzo IX, Francesco's sons, kept all Este for themselves (while retaining co-rulership in Ferrara which was abandoned by their children), and Niccolò and Obizzo, while keeping Ferrara, also recovered Modena.
Bertoldo I	c.1300 Sons of Francesco I and Orsina Orsini	1317– 21 July 1343	Marquisate of Este (with Lordship of Ferrara)	Domenica Pio; 1324 two children Caterina da Camino; July 1339; Ferrara no children	21 July 1343; Este aged 42–43	Following a pro-Este revolt in Ferrara, the sons of Aldobrandino II (Rinaldo, Niccolò, Obizzo) and Francesco I (Azzo and Bertoldo) ascended together. Bertoldo and Azzo IX, Francesco's sons, kept all Este for themselves (while retaining co-rulership in Ferrara which was abandoned by their children), and Niccolò and Obizzo, while keeping Ferrara, also recovered Modena.
Francesco II	June 1323; Ferrara; Son of Bertoldo I and Domenica Pio	21 July 1343 – 13 December 1384	Marquisate of Este	Caterina Visconti no children Taddea Barbiano three children	13 December 1384; Marquisate of Este aged 51	
Aldobrandino III	14 September 1335; Ferrara; First son of Obizzo III and Filippa Ariosto	20 March 1352 – 3 November 1361	Lordship of Ferrara	Beatrice da Camino; 1351 two children	3 November 1361; Ferrara aged 26	
Niccolò II the Lame	17 May 1338; Ferrara; Son of Obizzo III and Filippa Ariosto	3 November 1361 – 26 March 1388	Lordship of Ferrara (with Lordship of Modena since 1352)	Verde della Scala; February 1363 two children	26 March 1388; Ferrara aged 49	
Azzo X	1344; Este; Son of Francesco II and Taddea Barbiano	13 December 1384 – 1415	Marquisate of Este	Tommasina Guarnioni Ricciarda da Camino Amabilia Collalto three children (uncertain maternity)	1415; Venice aged 42–43	In 1393, he challenged the succession of Niccolò III in Ferrara.
Alberto V	27 February 1347; Ferrara; Son of Obizzo III and Jacopa Pepoli	26 March 1388 – 30 July 1393	Lordship of Ferrara (with Lordship of Modena)	Giovanna da Roberti; 1388 no children Isotta Albaresani (lover until 1393); 1393 one child (legitimized 1393)	30 July 1393; Ferrara aged 46	
Council of Regency supported by the Republics of Venice, Florence and Bologna (1393–1397)						His rule was contested early on by his cousin Azzo X, who was eventually defeated and imprisoned. Niccolò recovered Reggio in 1405.
Niccolò III	9 November 1383; Ferrara; Son of Alberto V and Isotta Albaresani	30 July 1393 – 6 December 1441	Lordship of Ferrara (with Lordship of Modena; with Lordship of Reggio since 1405)	Gigliola da Carrara; 1394 no children Laura (Parisina) Malatesta; 1418 three children Ricciarda of Saluzzo; 1429 or 1431 two children	6 December 1441; Milan aged 58	His rule was contested early on by his cousin Azzo X, who was eventually defeated and imprisoned. Niccolò recovered Reggio in 1405.
Taddeo	1390; Este; Son of Azzo X	1415 – 21 June 1448	Marquisate of Este	Margherita Pio two children Maddalena Arcelli no children	21 June 1448; Mozzanica aged 43	
Leonello	21 September 1407; Ferrara; Bastard son of Niccolò III and Stella de' Tolomei	6 December 1441 – 1 October 1450	Lordship of Ferrara (with Lordship of Modena and Lordship of Reggio)	Margherita Gonzaga; 1435 one child Maria of Naples; 1444 no children	1 October 1450; Voghiera aged 43	
Bertoldo II	May 1434; Este; Son of Taddeo and Margherita Pio	21 June 1448 – 4 November 1463	Marquisate of Este	Giacopa Leonessa no children	4 November 1463; Corinth aged 29	Left no descendants. After his death the original possessions of the family (marquisate of Este) were annexed to Ferrara.
The Marquisate of Este was definitively annexed to Modena-Ferrara-Reggio
Borso	24 August 1413; Ferrara; Bastard son of Niccolò III and Stella de' Tolomei	1 October 1450 – 20 August 1471	Lordships of Ferrara, Modena and Reggio (until 1452) Duchy of Ferrara, Modena and Reggio (since 1452)	Unmarried	20 August 1471 aged 57	
Ercole I the Fearless	26 October 1431; Ferrara; Son of Niccolò III and Ricciarda of Saluzzo	20 August 1471 – 15 June 1505	Duchy of Ferrara, Modena and Reggio	Eleanor of Naples; July 1473 six children	15 June 1505; Ferrara aged 73	
Sigismondo I	31 August 1433; Ferrara; Son of Niccolò III and Ricciarda of Saluzzo	11 May 1501 – 1 April 1507	Lordship of San Martino in Rio	Pizzocara three children	1 April 1507; Ferrara aged 73	Received the lordship based at San Martino in Rio from his brother.
Alfonso I the Artilleryman	21 July 1476; Ferrara; Son of Ercole I and Eleanor of Naples	15 June 1505 – 31 October 1534	Duchy of Ferrara, Modena and Reggio	Anna Maria Sforza; 23 January 1491; Pavia no children Lucrezia Borgia; 1 September 1501; Ferrara seven children	31 October 1534; Ferrara aged 58	
Ercole	c.1470 Bastard son of Sigismondo I and Cecilia Rachesi	1 April 1507 – 1523	Lordship of San Martino in Rio	Angela Sforza; 28 November 1492 two children	1523; Castellarano aged 52–53	
Sigismondo II	1493; Son of Ercole and Angela Sforza	1523–1561	Lordship of San Martino in Rio	Giustina Trivulzio; 1533 six children	1561; Pavia aged 67–68	
Alfonso	10 March 1527; Ferrara; Bastard son of Alfonso I and Laura Dianti	28 August 1533 – 1 November 1587	Lordship of Montecchio (1533–1562) Marquisate of Montecchio (1562–1587)	Giulia Della Rovere; 3 January 1549 three children	1 November 1587; Ferrara aged 50	Inherited from his father the lordship of Montecchio, which was raised to marquisate in 1569.
Ercole II	5 April 1508; Ferrara; Son of Alfonso I and Lucrezia Borgia	31 October 1534 – 3 October 1559	Duchy of Ferrara, Modena and Reggio	Renée of France; 28 June 1528; Paris five children	3 October 1559; Ferrara aged 51	
Alfonso II	22 November 1533; Ferrara; Son of Ercole II and Renée of France	3 October 1559 – 27 October 1597	Duchy of Ferrara, Modena and Reggio	Lucrezia de' Medici; 3 July 1558; Florence no children Barbara of Austria; 5 December 1565; Innsbruck no children Margherita Gonzaga; 24 February 1579; Ferrara no children	27 October 1597; Ferrara aged 63	Left no descendants. He was succeeded by his cousin Cesare.
Filippo I	1537; Ferrara; Son of Sigismondo II and Giustina Trivulzio	1561 – 13 December 1592	Lordship of San Martino in Rio (1561–1588) Marquisate of San Martino in Rio (1588–1592)	Maria of Savoy; 20 January 1570; Turin five children	13 December 1592; Ferrara aged 54–55	During his rule the lordship was raised to a marquisate (1588). Acquired in 1580 the marquisate of Lanzo.
Carlo Filiberto I	1 November 1571; San Martino in Rio; First son of Filippo I and Maria of Savoy	13 December 1592 – 26 May 1652	Marquisate of San Martino in Rio	Luisa de Cárdenas; 1606 no children Livia Marini Castagna no children	26 May 1652; Milan aged 80	Children of Filippo I, divided their patrimony.
Sigismondo	26 June 1572; Turin; Second son of Filippo I and Maria of Savoy	13 December 1592 – 26 August 1628	Marquisate of Lanzo	Francesca Charledes d’Antel d’Hostel; 1618 three children	26 August 1628; Turin aged 56	Children of Filippo I, divided their patrimony.
Cesare	8 October 1562; Ferrara; Son of Alfonso I, Marquess of Montecchio and Giulia della Rovere	1 November 1587 – 27 October 1597	Marquisate of Montecchio	Virginia de' Medici; 30 January 1586; Florence ten children	11 December 1628; Modena aged 67	Half cousin of Alfonso II. In 1598, the lack of recognition of his succession in Ferrara led to its annexation to the Papal States.
Cesare	8 October 1562; Ferrara; Son of Alfonso I, Marquess of Montecchio and Giulia della Rovere	27 October 1597 – 11 December 1628	Duchy of Ferrara, Modena and Reggio (until 1598) Duchy of Modena and Reggio (from 1598)	Virginia de' Medici; 30 January 1586; Florence ten children	11 December 1628; Modena aged 67	Half cousin of Alfonso II. In 1598, the lack of recognition of his succession in Ferrara led to its annexation to the Papal States.
Ferrara definitively annexed by the Papal States
Montecchio briefly annexed to Modena (1597–1638)
Filippo II Francesco	1621; First son of Sigismondo d'Este, Marquis of Lanzo and Francesca Charledes d’Antel d’Hostel	26 August 1628 – 26 May 1652	Marquisate of Lanzo	Margaret of Savoy; 30 November 1645; Turin three children	1653 aged 31–32	In 1652, reunited Lanzo and San Martino in Rio. Created, in 1646, the marquisate of Dronero.
Filippo II Francesco	1621; First son of Sigismondo d'Este, Marquis of Lanzo and Francesca Charledes d’Antel d’Hostel	26 May 1652 – 1653	Marquisate of San Martino in Rio	Margaret of Savoy; 30 November 1645; Turin three children	1653 aged 31–32	In 1652, reunited Lanzo and San Martino in Rio. Created, in 1646, the marquisate of Dronero.
Lanzo definitively annexed to San Martino in Rio
Alfonso III	22 October 1591; Ferrara; Son of Cesare and Virginia de' Medici	11 December 1628 – 11 July 1629	Duchy of Modena and Reggio	Isabella of Savoy; 22 February 1608; Turin fourteen children	26 May 1644; Castelnuovo di Garfagnana aged 52	In 1629, abdicated to his son, to enter in the Order of Friars Minor Capuchin.
Francesco I	6 September 1610; Modena; Son of Alfonso III and Isabella of Savoy	11 July 1629 – 14 October 1658	Duchy of Modena and Reggio	Maria Caterina Farnese; 11 January 1631; Parma nine children Vittoria Farnese; 12 February 1648; Parma one child Lucrezia Barberini; 14 October 1654 one child	14 October 1658; Santhià aged 48	Joined Florence and Venice against the Papal States in the Wars of Castro, hoping to reconquer Ferrara, with no success.
Luigi I	27 March 1594; Ferrara; Son of Cesare and Virginia de' Medici	1643 – 1 January 1664	Marquisate of Scandiano (with Marquisate of Montecchio)	Unmarried	1 January 1664; Modena aged 69	Invested by his nephew with marquisate of Scandiano, and with it also came the old Marquisate of Montecchio. With no descendants of his own, he was succeeded by his nephews.
Carlo Emanuele	1622; Borgomanero; Second son of Sigismondo d'Este, Marquis of Lanzo and Francesca Charledes d’Antel d’Hostel	26 May 1652 – 24 October 1695	Marquisate of Borgomanero	Paola Camilla Marliani; 1645 one child	24 October 1695; Vienna aged 72–73	Inherited from his uncle, Carlo Filiberto I, the lands of Borgomanero and Porlezza, creating a new marquisate.
Sigismondo III	1647; First son of Filippo II Francesco and Margaret of Savoy	1653 – 28 August 1732	Marquisate of San Martino in Rio	Maria Teresa of Monaco seven children	28 August 1732; Parma aged 84–85	Children of Filippo II, divided the patrimony. In 1720, the title of "marquess of Lanzo" ceased to exist.
Carlo Filiberto	1649; Second son of Filippo II Francesco and Margaret of Savoy	1653 – 25 July 1703	Marquisate of Dronero	Thérese de Mesmes de Marolles six children	25 July 1703; Parma aged 53–54	Children of Filippo II, divided the patrimony. In 1720, the title of "marquess of Lanzo" ceased to exist.
Alfonso IV	14 October 1634; Modena; Son of Francesco I and Maria Caterina Farnese	14 October 1658 – 16 July 1662	Duchy of Modena and Reggio	Laura Martinozzi; 27 May 1655; Compiègne two children	16 July 1662; Modena aged 27	
Regency of Laura Martinozzi (1662–1674)						
Francesco II	6 March 1660; Modena; Son of Alfonso IV and Laura Martinozzi	16 July 1662 – 6 September 1694	Duchy of Modena and Reggio	Margherita Maria Farnese; 14 July 1692; Parma no children	6 September 1694; Modena aged 34	
Luigi II	28 August 1648; Reggio Emilia; First son of Borso d'Este and Ippolita d'Este	1 January 1664 – 26 May 1698	Marquisate of Scandiano	Unmarried	26 May 1698; Modena aged 49	Children of Borso, and nephews of Luigi I. Divided the inherited patrimony: Foresto abdicated of Montecchio to his younger brother Cesare Ignazio, but inherited his elder brother Luigi's property: after their deaths the patrimony was annexed to Modena.
Foresto	20 April 1652; Modena; Second son of Borso d'Este and Ippolita d'Este	1 January 1664 – 23 May 1680	Marquisate of Montecchio	Unmarried	1725 aged 72–73	Children of Borso, and nephews of Luigi I. Divided the inherited patrimony: Foresto abdicated of Montecchio to his younger brother Cesare Ignazio, but inherited his elder brother Luigi's property: after their deaths the patrimony was annexed to Modena.
Foresto	20 April 1652; Modena; Second son of Borso d'Este and Ippolita d'Este	26 May 1698 – 1725	Marquisate of Scandiano	Unmarried	1725 aged 72–73	Children of Borso, and nephews of Luigi I. Divided the inherited patrimony: Foresto abdicated of Montecchio to his younger brother Cesare Ignazio, but inherited his elder brother Luigi's property: after their deaths the patrimony was annexed to Modena.
Cesare Ignazio	1653; Third son of Borso d'Este and Ippolita d'Este	23 May 1680 – 27 October 1713	Marquisate of Montecchio	Unmarried	27 October 1713; Reggio Emilia aged 59–60	Children of Borso, and nephews of Luigi I. Divided the inherited patrimony: Foresto abdicated of Montecchio to his younger brother Cesare Ignazio, but inherited his elder brother Luigi's property: after their deaths the patrimony was annexed to Modena.
Montecchio was annexed to Modena
Scandiano was annexed to Modena
Rinaldo	26 April 1655; Modena; Son of Francesco I and Lucrezia Barberini	6 September 1694 – 26 April 1737	Duchy of Modena and Reggio	Charlotte Felicitas of Brunswick-Lüneburg; 11 February 1696; Modena seven children	26 April 1737; Modena aged 82	Albeit declaring neutrality on the War of the Spanish Succession, France invaded Modena and Rinaldo had to flee to Bologna. In 1707, German troops ousted the French and restored the throne to Rinaldo.
Carlo Filiberto	1646; Son of Carlo Emanuele and Paola Camilla Marliani	24 October 1695 – 1714	Marquisate of Borgomanero	Bibiana Gonzaga; 1671 one child	1714 aged 67–68	
Gabriele	1673; Turin; Son of Carlo Filiberto and Thérese de Mesmes de Marolles	25 July 1703 – 1734	Marquisate of Dronero (with Marquisate of Borgomanero from 1716)	Clara Colomba Cobianchi two children	1734; Castelfranco Emilia aged 60–61	After his death Dronero was inherited by the Birago di Vische family, and Borgomanero reverted to Modena.
Borgomanero was annexed to San Martino in Rio
Dronero inherited by the Birago di Vische family
Carlo Filiberto II	16 March 1678; San Martino in Rio; Son of Sigismondo III and Maria Teresa of Monaco	1732 – 30 April 1752	Marquisate of San Martino in Rio (1732–1747) Principality of San Martino in Rio (1747–1752)	Teresa Sfondrati (1710–1773); 1734 three children	30 April 1752; San Martino in Rio aged 74	In 1747 the marquisate was raised to a principality. However, as he didn't have male heirs, after his death, the lands he ruled went to Modena.
San Martino in Rio definitively annexed to Modena-Reggio
Francesco III	2 July 1698; Modena; Son of Rinaldo and Charlotte Felicitas of Brunswick-Lüneburg	26 April 1737 – 22 February 1780	Duchy of Modena and Reggio	Charlotte Aglaé d'Orléans; 21 June 1720; Modena ten children	22 February 1780; Modena aged 81	As the duchy was bankrupted by the Wars of the Spanish, Polish, and Austrian Successions, Francesco sold artworks of the Estense Gallery. He was a careful administrator, but most of the duchy's financial policy was in the hands of the Austrian plenipotentiary, Beltrame Cristiani.
Ercole III	22 September 1727; Modena; Son of Francesco III and Charlotte Aglaé d'Orléans	22 February 1780 – 16 October 1796	Duchy of Modena and Reggio	Maria Teresa Cybo-Malaspina, Duchess of Massa; 16 April 1741; Modena two children Chiara Marini; 1795 (morganatic) one child	14 October 1803; Treviso aged 75	In 1785 he founded the Atesine Academy of Fine Arts: during his reign arts and culture flourished. The French invasion forced him to flee to Venice on 7 May 1796. Later, French soldiers captured him there, robbing 200,000 zecchini from his house. Then he moved to Treviso, where he died in 1803. The peaces of Treaty of Campo Formio (1797) and Lunéville had assigned him territories in Breisgau in exchange of the lost Duchy, but he never took possession of them.

== Habsburg-Este dukes of Modena and Reggio, 1814–1859 ==
(from 1815 also Duke of Mirandola and from 1829 Duke of Massa and Prince of Carrara)

Name	Portrait	Birth	Marriages	Death
Francesco IV; 14 July 1814– 21 January 1846		6 October 1779; Milan son of Ferdinand, Duke of Breisgau and Maria Beatrice d'Este, Duchess of Massa	Maria Beatrice of Savoy; 20 June 1812; Cagliari Cathedral four children	21 January 1846; Modena aged 66
Francesco V 21 January 1846– 11 June 1859		1 June 1819; Modena son of Francis IV and Maria Beatrice of Savoy	Princess Adelgunde of Bavaria; 20 March 1842; Kreuzkirche (Munich) one daughter	20 November 1875; Vienna aged 56

== Habsburg-Este dukes of Modena and Reggio, post monarchy ==
Name	Portrait	Birth	Marriages	Death
Francesco V 1859–1875		1 June 1819; Modena son of Francis IV and Maria Beatrice of Savoy	Princess Adelgunde of Bavaria; 20 March 1842; Kreuzkirche (Munich) one daughter	20 November 1875; Vienna aged 56
Francis Ferdinand; 1875–1914		18 December 1863; Austria son of Archduke Karl Ludwig of Austria and Maria Annunciata of Bourbon-Two Sicilies	Sophie, Duchess of Hohenberg; 1 July 1900; Reichstadt three children	28 June 1914; Sarajevo aged 50
Charles; 1914–1917		17 August 1887; Austria-Hungary son of Archduke Otto Franz Joseph of Austria and Princess Maria Josepha of Saxony	Zita of Bourbon-Parma; 21 October 1911; Schwarzau) eight children	1 April 1922; Funchal aged 34
Robert; 1917–1996		8 February 1915; Austria-Hungary son of Charles and Zita of Bourbon-Parma	Margherita of Savoy-Aosta; 28 December 1953; Bourg-en-Bresse five children	7 February 1996; Basel aged 80
Lorenz; 1996–present		16 December 1955; France son of Robert and Margherita of Savoy-Aosta	Princess Astrid of Belgium 22 September 1984 Brussels five children	alive age 69

Heir apparent: Prince Amedeo of Belgium, Archduke of Austria-Este

== See also ==
- List of Modenese consorts
- List of Ferrarese consorts
