= Obizzo II d'Este =

Italian noble (1247–1293)

- Marquis of Ferrara
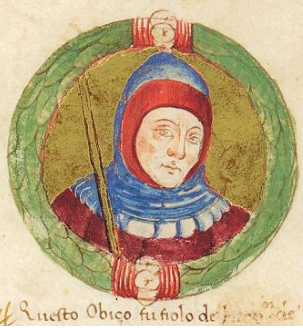
- Obizzo II depicted in the Genealogia dei principi d'Este (1470s)
- Predecessor: Rinaldo d'Este (1221–1251)
- Successor: Azzo VIII d'Este
- Noble family: House of Este
- Spouses: Giacomina Fieschi; Constanza della Scala
- Issue: Azzo VIII d'Este; Beatrice d'Este (1268-1334); Aldobrandino II d'Este; Francesco d'Este
- Father: Rinaldo d'Este (1221–1251)

Obizzo II d'Este (c. 1247 – 13 February 1293) was Marquis of Ferrara and Ancona.

== Biography ==
Obizzo was the illegitimate son of Rinaldo I d'Este. His father was the son and heir of the Margrave Azzo VII d'Este. Soon after his birth, Obizzo was expelled from Ferrara with his mother and settled in Ravenna.

For his birth, Obizzo was destined to an obscure future. Nevertheless, this situation changed in 1251 when his father Rinaldo, a hostage of emperor Frederick II since 1238, was poisoned with his barren wife, Adelaide da Romano. Without any other sons to continue his line, the Margrave Azzo VII saw in Obizzo the only chance of survival of the House of Este and fought for his recognition as his heir. Obizzo was legitimated by the Pope Innocent IV in 1252, shortly after his mother drowned.

In 1264 he was proclaimed lifelong ruler of Ferrara, Lord of Modena in 1288 and of Reggio in 1289. His rule marked the end of the communal period in Ferrara and the beginning of the Lordship, which lasted until the 17th century.

Obrizzo was most likely killed by his son Azzo VIII d'Este. Azzo claimed the government as the eldest son (primogeniture) but his brothers Aldobrandino and Francesco made a violent dispute for their rights. Finally, they made a divisionary treaty over the lands: Azzo retained Ferrara, Aldobrandino received Modena and Francesco obtained Reggio Emilia. (Note: Bartlett states the Este domininions were divided between the three brothers.)

Obizzo d'Este is cited in Dante's Inferno and is in the first compartment of the Seventh Circle of Hell for purchasing Ghisola from her brother Venedico Cacciamenico for sexual relations.

=== First marriage ===
In 1263, Obizzo married Giacomina Fieschi, daughter of Niccolò Fieschi di Lavagna and niece of Pope Adrian V. They had:

- Azzo VIII d'Este (after 1263 – 31 January 1308)
- Beatrice (died 15 September 1334), married firstly to Ugolino Visconti, Giudice of Gallura and secondly, on 24 June 1300, to Galeazzo I Visconti, Lord of Milan
- Maddalena, married firstly to Aldobrandino Turchi, of Ferrara, and secondly to Raniero di Canossa
- Aldobrandino II d'Este (died 1326)
- Francesco d'Este

=== Second marriage ===
In 1289, Obizzo married Costanza della Scala, daughter of Alberto I della Scala, Lord of Verona. This union was childless.

== Sources ==
- Bartlett, Kenneth (2019). The Renaissance in Italy: A History. Hackett Publishing Company, Inc. ISBN 9781624668203.
- Hyde, John Kenneth (1966). Padua in the Age of Dante. Manchester University Press. ISBN 9781597400695.
- Parker, Deborah (1993). "Ideology and Cultural Practice: The Case of Dante's Treatment of Beatrice d'Este". Dante Studies, with the Annual Report of the Dante Society (111): 131–147.

Preceded by Azzo VII	Ruler of Ferrara; 1264–1293	Succeeded by Azzo VIII
