= Obizzo III d'Este =

Marquess of Ferrara (1294–1352)

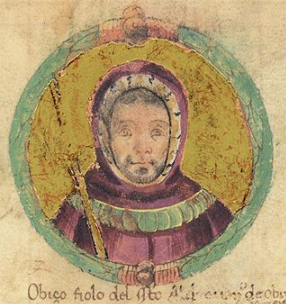
- Obizzo III depicted in the Genealogia dei principi d'Este (1470s)
- Born: 14 July 1294
- Died: 20 March 1352 (aged 57)
- Noble family: House of Este
- Spouses: Elisabeth of Saxe-Wittenberg; Lippa Ariosti
- Issue Detail: Albert V d'Este; Niccolò II d'Este; Aldobrandino III d'Este
- Father: Aldobrandino II d'Este
- Mother: Alda Rangoni

Obizzo III d'Este (14 July 1294 – 20 March 1352) was the Marquess of Ferrara from 1317 until his death. He initially shared the lordship of Ferrar with his brothers, but ended up as the sole ruler. Obizzo expanded his family possessions by acquiring the cities of Modena and Parma.

== Life ==
Obizzo was the son of Aldobrandino II d'Este and Alda Rangoni. He was lord of Ferrara with his brothers Rinaldo and Niccolò, and his cousin Folco II, but in the end reigned as sole ruler. He managed to enlarge the family possessions with their restoration by consilia generale communis et populi of Modena in 1336, while Parma was sold to Obizzo in 1344.

In May 1317, Obizzo married firstly Giacoma Pepoli, daughter of Romeo de' Peppoli from Bologna, with whom he had no children. There are also reports that he married Princess Elisabeth of Saxony, Angria, and Westphalia, daughter of Albert II, Duke of Saxony.

In 1347, Obizzo married secondly Lippa Ariosti, known as la Bella, and his long-time mistress. The marriage took place shortly before Lippa's death on 27 November 1347 to legitimize their many children:

- Beatrice (18 September 1332 – 1387), married in 1365 to Waldemar I, Prince of Anhalt-Zerbst.
- Alda (18 July 1333 – 1381), married in 1356 to Ludovico II Gonzaga.
- Rinaldo (10 October 1334 – 20 July 1348), died young
- Aldobrandino III (14 September 1335 – 2/3 November 1361)
- Alisia (18 March 1337 – 12 August 1402), married in 1349 to Guido III Novello da Polenta, Lord of Ravenna.
- Niccolò II (17 May 1338 – 26 March 1388)
- Azzo (14 March 1340 – 18 September 1349), died young
- Folco (1342–1356), died young
- Costanza (25 July 1343 – 13 February 1391), married in 1363 to Malatesta IV Malatesta, Lord of Rimini.
- Alberto (1347 – 30 July 1393)

In addition, Obizzo had another illegitimate son by an unknown mistress, Giovanni (1324–1389), later Governor of Frignano, who was also legitimized.

== Sources ==
- Allen, A. M. (1910). A History of Verona. Methuen & Company.
- Bestor, Jane Fair (1996). "Bastardy and Legitimacy in the Formation of a Regional State in Italy: The Estense Succession". Comparative Studies in Society and History. 38 (3 (Jul.)): 549–585.
- Cochrane, Eric (2019). Historians and Historiography in the Italian Renaissance. University of Chicago Press. ISBN 9780226111544.
- Hyde, John Kenneth (1966). Padua in the Age of Dante. Manchester University Press. ISBN 9781597400695.

Obizzo III d'Este House of Este Born: 14 July 1294 Died: 20 March 1352
Preceded by Aldobrandino II	Marquess of Ferrara; 1317–1352	Succeeded by Aldobrandino III
