= Azzo VII d'Este =

Italian nobleman (1205–1264)

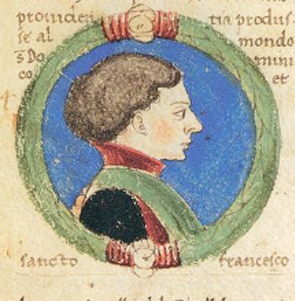
- Azzo VII depicted in the Genealogia dei principi d'Este (1470s)
- Born: c. 1205
- Died: 17 February 1264; Ferrara
- Buried: San Francesco, Ferrara
- Noble family: House of Este
- Spouses: Giovanna; Mabilia Pallavicini
- Issue more...: Rinaldo d'Este; Beatrice d'Este; Costanza d'Este; Cubitosa d'Este
- Father: Azzo VI d'Este
- Mother: Alix de Châtillon

Azzo VII d'Este (also known as Novello; c. 1205 – 17 February 1264) was an Italian nobleman and military leader. He was the Marquis of Este and the first signore (lord) of Ferrara from 1240.

== Biography ==
Azzo was the son of Marquis Azzo VI d'Este and his third wife, Alix de Châtillon, daughter of Raynald of Châtillon. Following the death of his elder half-brother Aldobrandino in 1215, the adolescent Azzo (referred to as adolescens as late as 1224) inherited the family's titles and claims.

He held several important civic offices. This includes serving as Podestà of Vicenza in 1236 and of Mantua from 1247 to 1253. In 1229, he was also the Vogt (advocate) of the monastery of Sant'Antonio in Ferrara.

Azzo VII played a key part in the conflicts of northern Italy. Azoo helped expel the Ghibelline leader, Salinguerra Torelli from Ferrara and established himself as lord of the town.

His testament is dated 13 February 1264. He died in Ferrara on 17 February 1264 and was buried in the church of San Francesco.

== Marriages and children ==
Azzo VII married twice, the first being around 1221 with a woman named Giovanna (died 1233), whose parentage is unknown. He had at least four children with her, most notably, Rinaldo d'Este (c. 1221 – 1251), who after being taken hostage by Emperor Frederick II died in prison in Apulia. Rinaldo predeceased his father but left an illegitimate son, Obizzo, who eventually succeeded as marquis and lord of Ferrara.

Italian nobility
Preceded by Azzo VI d'Este	Marquis of Este; 1215–1264; With: Aldobrandino d'Este (1212–1215)	Succeeded by Obizzo II d'Este
