= Aldobrandino II d'Este =

Italian noble from 1317 (died 1326)

- Marquess of Ferrara
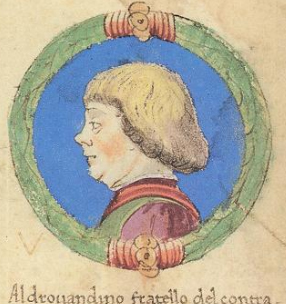
- Aldobrandino II depicted in the Genealogia dei principi d'Este
- Predecessor: Francesco d'Este
- Successor: Obizzo III d'Este
- Noble family: House of Este
- Spouse: Alda di Tobia Rangoni
- Issue: Obizzo III d'Este; Alisa d’Este; Nicolo I d'Este; Rinaldo II d'Este
- Father: Obizzo II d'Este

Aldobrandino II d'Este (died 1326) was a titular marquess of Este and ruler of Ferrara from 1317 until his death.

== Biography ==
Aldobrandino II was the second surviving son of Obizzo II d'Este by his first wife Jacopina (Giacomina) Fieschi, the niece of Pope Adrian V. He had two full brothers, Azzo VIII and Francesco, two sisters, Beatrice and Maddalena, and three illegitimate half-brothers, Matteo, Francesco, and Rinaldo.

Disappointed in the expectation that he would succeed to his father's holdings in Modena, Aldobrandino II rebelled against his older brother Azzo VIII soon after their father's death in 1293. Aldobrandino II relied upon the friendship of Padua and the ruler of Verona, Alberto I della Scala, thus turning his opposition to his brother into a regional war that went on from 1295 to 1299. It was at Padua that Aldobrandino's second son, Obizzo, was born in 1294. After Azzo VIII's marriage to Beatrice of Naples and his new arrangements for the succession, disinheriting his brothers, their younger brother Francesco also rebelled and joined Aldobrandino II at Padua. Following intermittent conflict and reconciliation, Aldobrandino and Francesco finally reconciled with Azzo shortly before the latter's death, at Este, in Paduan territory.

When Azzo VIII died unexpectedly on 31 January 1308, the provisions in his will and the actions of Ferrara's municipal authorities preempted Aldobrandino II and Francesco from inheriting his position and holdings as his legitimate heirs; instead, Azzo VIII's designated successor, his grandson Folco d'Este, was accepted as ruler, under the guardianship of his father, Azzo's illegitimate son Francesco (Fresco). Aldobrandino and Francesco, who came to an agreement with each other regarding their brother's assets, asserted their claims as legitimate heirs, citing a supposed different will of Azzo, that named them such after their reconciliation. Their claims were ignored, as their nephew Fresco secured the support of Bologna and later Venice.

This failure led Aldobrandino II and Francesco to appeal to Ferrara's technical overlord, Pope Clement V, then resident at Avignon, and to seek assistance from Padua. The heavy conditions demanded for this from the government of Padua, however, quickly discouraged Aldobrandino, who disavowed Francesco's agreement with Padua. Aldobrandino now emancipated his two eldest sons Rinaldo and Obizzo, passing to them their shares of his property and enabling them to pursue the family claims alongside their uncle Francesco. Aldobrandino himself retired to Bologna, where he had plenty of friends. When he failed to answer summons for service from Padua in late February 1308, he was placed under ban and his holdings in Paduan territory were confiscated.

While Aldobrandino's sons Rinaldo and Obizzo fought together with his brother Francesco against Fresco, with varied success, Aldobrandino remained in his Bolognese exile. The final defeat of Fresco in 1308 and the gradual displacement of his Venetian allies led to the elevation of Francesco as nominal ruler of Ferrara, under the auspices of the papal representatives; but by January 1310, Ferrara was under direct papal authority. Aldobrandino and Francesco entered into some dispute over the division of the family inheritance, which was mediated by the papal nunzio Onofrio de Trebis. On 23 August 1312, Aldobrandino was at Ferrara, when his the papal commander Dalmau de Bonyuls killed his brother Francesco in an attempt to arrest him. Fearing his reprisals, the papal troops placed Aldobrandino under arrest, but he was quickly freed at the intercession of Bologna, on 28 August. While Ferrara remained under direct papal control, Aldobrandino and his sons pursued an inheritance dispute with Francesco's sons Azzo IX and Bertolo I, mediated by clergy from Ravenna and Padua, and Aldobrandino arranged for the wedding of his son Obizzo to the Bolognese aristocrat Giovanna di Romeo Pepoli, which was celebrated in May 1317.

In late July 1317, as a result of a violent popular uprising against the Neapolitan troops garrisoning Ferrara for the Pope's vicar, King Robert of Naples, the Este were restored as rulers of Ferrara. Aldobrandino's sons Rinaldo and Obizzo and their first cousin Azzo IX, son of Francesco, immediately appeared at Ferrara to take charge of the government, having apparently colluded with the rebels beforehand. Obizzo rushed back to Bologna to convince the Bolognese against supporting the besieged Neapolitan troops in the Castello Tedaldo of Ferrara, a mission he carried out with success. Aldobrandino II appears to have adopted a secondary role in all these events, but he was included in the collegiate rule of Ferrara alongside his three sons (Rinaldo II, Obizzo III, Niccolò I) and two nephews (Azzo IX and Bertolo I), formally instituted on 15 August 1317.

Aldobrandino II remained only marginally involved in the running of the city, and appears to have continued to reside primarily at Bologna. He died at Bologna in June 1326, and his body was brought to Ferrara for burial at the Franciscan monastery there. While he was survived by his three sons and one of his nephews, the leading member of the next generation was his second son, Obizzo III d'Este.

== Family and Descendants ==
Aldobrandino II had married Alda di Tobia Rangoni. They had four children, as follows.

- Rinaldo II d'Este, co-ruler and successor of father, d. 1335
- Obizzo III d'Este, co-ruler and successor of father, d. 1352
- Niccolò I d'Este, co-ruler and successor of father, d. 1344
- Alisia (Elisa) d'Este, d. 1329, married Rinaldo Passerino Bonacolsi, Lord of Mantua, d. 1330

== Bibliography ==
- Battioni, Gianluca, "Este, Francesco d'," in Dizionario Biografico degli Italiani 43 (1993). online
- Bertolini, Paolo. "Este, Obizzo d'," in Dizionario Biografico degli Italiani 43 (1993). available online
- Chronicon Estense. Muratori, L. A. (ed.), Rerum italicarum scriptores 15:3 (1898). online
- Dean, Trevor. Land and Power in Late Medieval Ferrara: The Rule of the Este, 1350–1450. Cambridge, 1988.
- Diakité, Rala I.; Sneider, Matthew T. (2022). The Eleventh and Twelfth Books of Giovanni Villani's “New Chronicle”. Walter de Gruyter GmbH & Co KG. ISBN 978-1-5015-1426-5.
- Hyde, John Kenneth (1966). Padua in the Age of Dante. Manchester University Press. ISBN 9781597400695.
- Menache, Sophia. Clement V. Cambridge, 1998.
- Mollat, Guillaume. The Popes at Avignon, 1305–1378. New York, 1963.
- Moressa, Pierluigi. Gli Estensi: Storia di una grande dinastia. Santarcangelo di Romagna, 2024.

Preceded by Francesco	Marquess of Ferrara; 1317–1326	Succeeded by Obizzo III
