= Aldobrandino III d'Este =

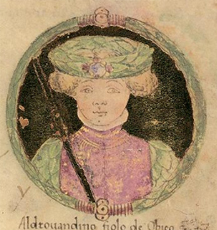
Aldobrandino III depicted in the Genealogia dei principi d'Este (1470s)

Aldobrandino III d'Este (14 September 1335 – 3 November 1361) was the Lord of Ferrara and Modena from 1352 until his death in 1361.

He was the son of Obizzo III d'Este and Lippa Ariosti.

He was one of the first Italian lords to accompany Charles IV in his march to Rome to receive the imperial coronation, this deed gaining him numerous privileges.

== Sources ==
- Bestor, Jane Fair (1996). "Bastardy and Legitimacy in the Formation of a Regional State in Italy: The Estense Succession". Comparative Studies in Society and History. 38 (3 (Jul.)): 549–585.

Preceded by Obizzo III	Marquess of Ferrara; 1352–1361	Succeeded by Niccolò II
