= Rinaldo d'Este (1221–1251) =

13th-century Italian nobleman

- Marquis of Ferrara
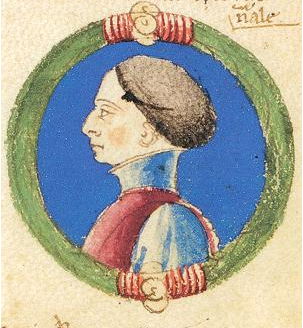
- Rinaldo depicted in the Genealogia dei principi d'Este (1470s)
- Predecessor: Azzo VII d'Este
- Successor: Obizzo II d'Este
- Noble family: House of Este
- Spouse: Adelaide di Romano
- Issue: Obizzo II d'Este (ill.)
- Father: Azzo VII d'Este
- Mother: Giovanna

Rinaldo d'Este (shortly after 1221 – c. 1251) was a member of the House of Este.

He was the son of Azzo VII d'Este, Marquis of Ferrara, from his first marriage c. 1221 to Giovanna (+1233). Azzo VII became the leader of the Guelph forces against Frederick II Hohenstaufen, King of Germany. He captured Ferrara from Ezzelino III da Romano and his Ghibelline troops. He became Marquis (Margrave) of Ferrara.

Rinaldo was the only son and heir. He married Ezzelino III's niece Adelaide, but she was barren. He had a relation to a Neapolitan laundress and an illegitimate child by her, Obizzo, born c. 1247. Soon after the birth, Obizzo and his mother were expelled from Ferrara; they settled in Ravenna. In 1238 Rinaldo and his wife were captured by Frederick II and died, by poison, in Apulia in 1251.

Azzo VII had three daughters but no other sons to continue his line, and thus saw in Obizzo the only chance of survival of the House of Este. Obizzo's mother was drowned in the Adriatic; shortly after, Obizzo was legitimized by Pope Innocent IV, in 1252. He finally succeeded his grandfather in 1264 as Marquis of Ferrara.

== Family ==
In c. 1233 Rinaldo married Adelaide di Romano (+1251), daughter of Alberigo di Romano. He had no children.

From an illegitimate relation to a Neapolitan laundress he had:

- Obizzo II d'Este, Marquis of Ferrara (c. 1247 – 1293).

== Sources ==
- Bartlett, Kenneth (2019). The Renaissance in Italy: A History. Hackett Publishing Company, Inc. ISBN 9781624668203.
- Paoletti, John T.; Radke, Gary M. (2005). Art in Renaissance Italy. Laurence King.
