= Pellegrue =

- Commune
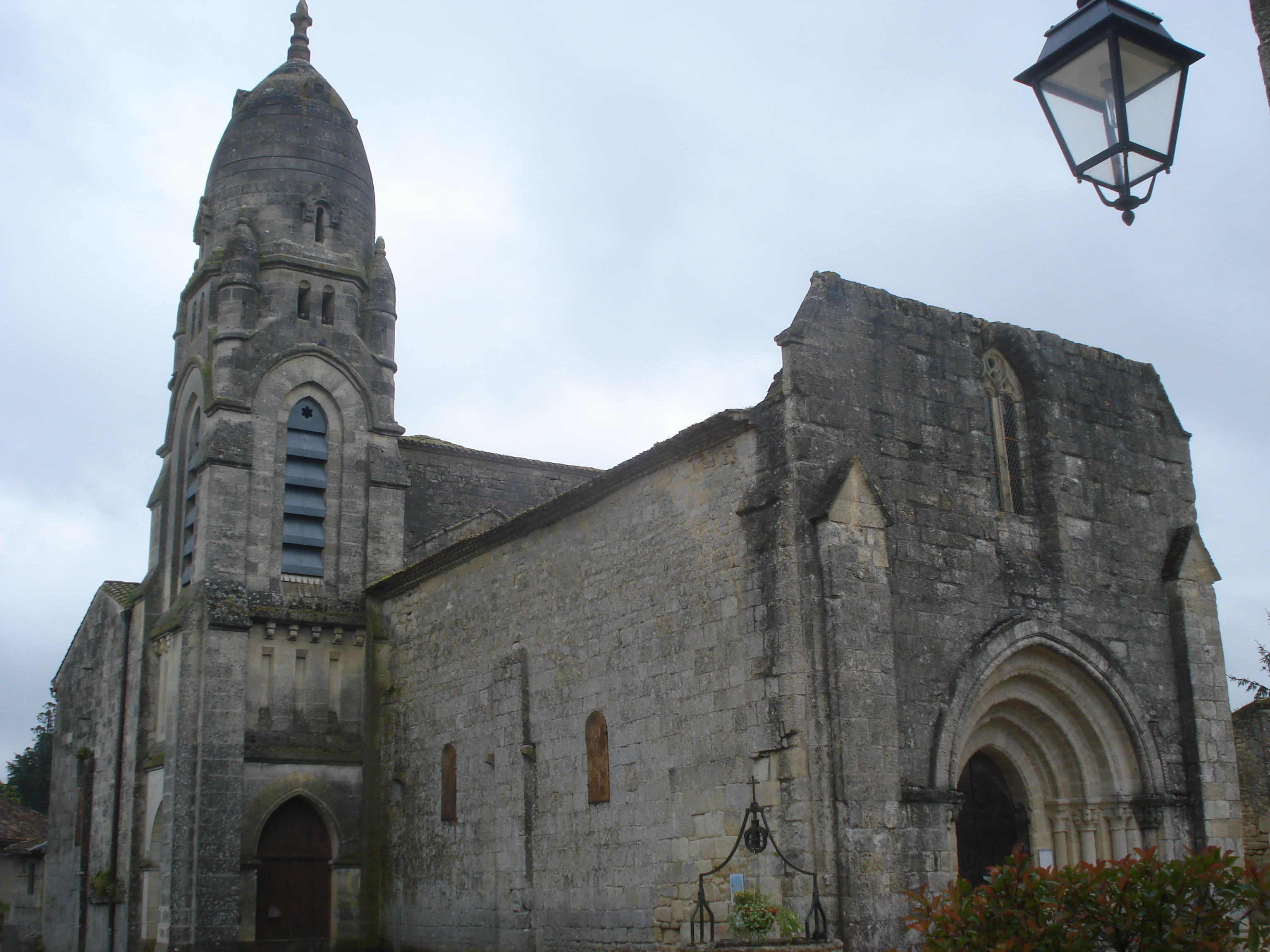
- The church in Pellegrue

- Coat of arms
- Location of Pellegrue
- Location within France Location within Nouvelle-Aquitaine
- Coordinates: 44°44′39″N 0°04′34″E
- Country: France
- Region: Nouvelle-Aquitaine
- Department: Gironde
- Arrondissement: Langon
- Canton: Le Réolais et Les Bastides

Government
  - Mayor (2020–2026): José Bluteau
- Area^{1}: 38.18 km^{2} (14.74 sq mi)
- Highest elevation: 132 m (433 ft)
- Lowest elevation: 33 m (108 ft)
- Population (2023): 923
  - Density: 24.2/km^{2} (62.6/sq mi)
- Time zone: UTC+01:00 (CET)
  - Summer (DST): UTC+02:00 (CEST)
- INSEE/Postal code: 33316 /33790
- ^{1} French Land Register data, which excludes lakes, ponds, glaciers > 1 km^{2} (0.386 sq mi or 247 acres) and river estuaries.

Pellegrue (French pronunciation: [pɛlɡʁy]; Occitan: Pelagrua) is a commune in the Gironde department in Nouvelle-Aquitaine in southwestern France.

== Population ==
Historical population
Year	Pop.	±% p.a.
1968	1,343	—
1975	1,144	−2.27%
1982	1,065	−1.02%
1990	1,046	−0.22%
1999	979	−0.73%
2007	1,033	+0.67%
2012	1,006	−0.53%
2017	1,099	+1.78%
2023	923	−2.87%
Source: INSEE

== See also ==
- Communes of the Gironde department
