= Arnaud de Pellegrue =

Arnaud de Pellegrue

Arnaud de Pellegrue (died August 1331) was a cardinal-nephew of Pope Clement V, the first pope of the Avignon Papacy.

== Biography ==
He was born in Château Lamothe, Ancient Diocese of Bazas to the "ancient and noble" house of de la Mothe Pellegrue, a relative (and probably a nephew) of Clement V. His first name is sometimes given as Arnaldo in Italian sources, and his last name varies as Pelagura, Pelaugrue, or Pelagrua as well.

He was elevated as cardinal deacon of S. Maria in Portico on December 15, 1305. He was also the archdeacon of the cathedral chapter of Chartres, France, where he built two chapels: one dedicated to Saint Jérôme, and the other to Saint Christoph. In 1295, he became vicar general of Clement V in Comminges, and later became vicar general in Bordeaux.

As papal legate to Italy, Pellegrue was absent from Avignon between January 25, 1309 and December 10, 1310. Pellegrue led the papal army after Clement V declared war on Venice in 1309 over the disputed lordship of the strategic city of Ferrara, in which Francesco d'Este and his brothers opposed the succession as signore of Ferrara of their great-nephew Folco in 1308 and turned to Padua and the papacy for support. In May Pellegrue led the papal army though Asti to Parma, Piacenza, and Bologna, augmenting his forces with local mobs as he passed through. Pellegrue allied himself with the Lombards, Bologna, and Florence (from which he lifted the interdict). His forces outnumbered the Venetian supporters of Folco by the time he reached Ferrara in August; once there, he laid siege to Castel Tedaldo and blocked navigation on the Po River. According to Venetian reports, the captured forces were subjected to various atrocities, including blinding, when the fortress fell in September. Ferrara was placed under direct papal rule, and in the ensuing disorders, Francesco was killed in a skirmish, August 23, 1312.

In February 1312 Arnaud was one of the three French cardinals and one Italian conferring with Guillaume de Nogaret and other agents of Philip IV of France at the Council of Vienne where the Templars were to be suppressed.

He was named Cardinal protector of the Order of the Friars Minor (Franciscans) in 1313, and also the Governor of Bologna and the Governor of Ferrara; the Bolognese requested Pellegrue as Protector in 1311. As cardinal elector, he participated in the papal conclave, 1314-1316 which elected Pope John XXII. At the conclave Pellegrue led the Gascon faction, which numbered ten of the twenty-three total cardinals, all ten being creatures of Clement V, who were supported by Clement V's nephew, Bertrand de Got, viscount of Lomagne and Raimond Guilhem de Budos. He died in August 1331 in Avignon.
