= Duchy of Ferrara =

Former duchy in Northern Italy

Duchy of Ferrara Ducatus Ferrariensis (Latin) Ducato di Ferrara (Italian) Ducà ad Frara (Emilian)
- 1471–1597
- Flag Coat of arms

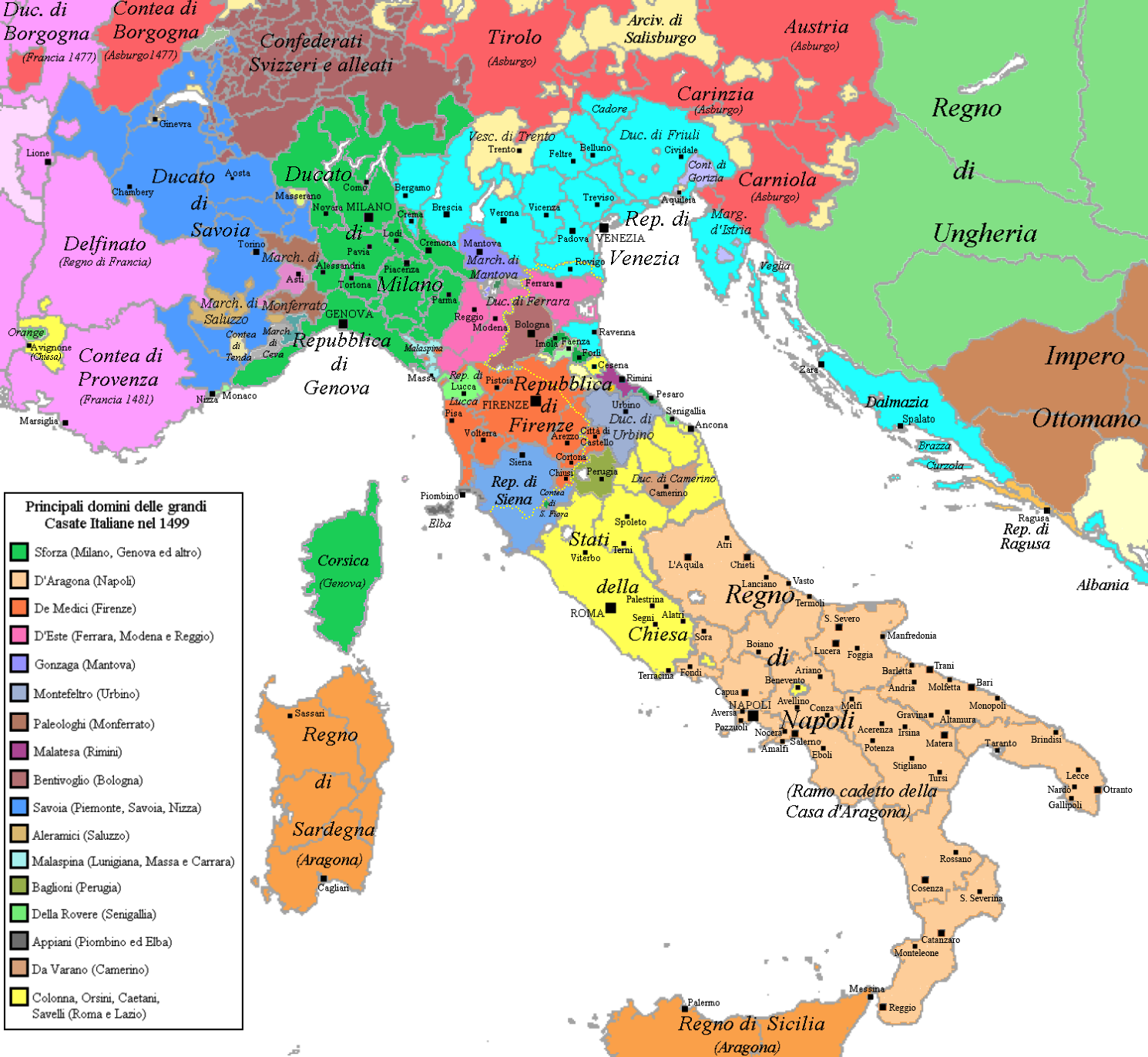
- Territories of the House of Este in 1499 (shown in purple)
- Capital: Ferrara
- Common languages: Latin (official); Emilian (common)
- Religion: Roman Catholicism
- Government: Non-sovereign monarchy
- Duke
  - 1471–1471(first): Borso I
  - 1559–1597 (last): Alfonso II
- History
  - Borso d'Este is elevated to Duke of Ferrara by Pope Paul II: 1471
  - House of Este loses Ferrara to Papacy: 1597
- Currency: Ferrara mint, Idra, Ducat
Preceded by
Commune of Ferrara
Republic of Venice
Succeeded by
Duchy of Modena and Reggio
Papal States
Republic of Venice
- Today part of: Italy

The Duchy of Ferrara (Latin: Ducatus Ferrariensis; Italian: Ducato di Ferrara; Emilian: Ducà ad Frara) was a state in what is now northern Italy. It consisted of about 1,100 km^{2} south of the lower Po River, stretching to the valley of the lower Reno River, including the city of Ferrara. The territory that was part of the Duchy was ruled by the House of Este from 1146 to 1597.

Borso d'Este, already Duke of Modena and Reggio, and lord of Ferrara, was raised to Duke of Ferrara by Pope Paul II. Borso and his successors ruled Ferrara as a quasi-sovereign state until 1597, when it came under direct papal rule.

== Background ==
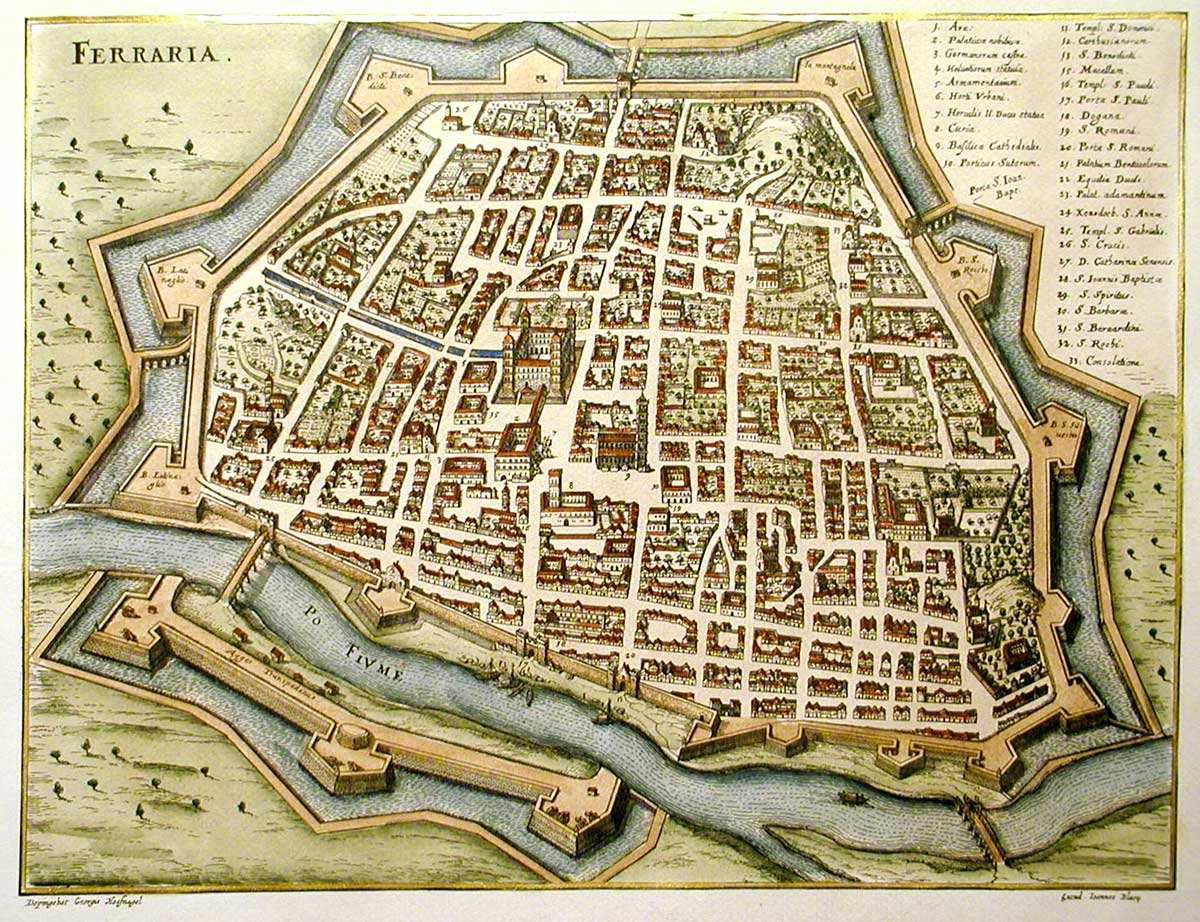
Ferrara, walled and moated, ca 1600.

The origin of Ferrara is uncertain. It was probably settled by the inhabitants of the lagoons at the mouth of the Po. There are two early centres of settlement: one around the cathedral, the other, the castrum bizantino, being the San Pietro district, on the opposite shore, where the Primaro empties into the Volano channel. Ferrara appears first in a document of the Lombard king Desiderius of 753 AD, as a city forming part of the Exarchate of Ravenna. Desiderius pledged a Lombard ducatus ferrariae ("Duchy of Ferrara") in 757 to Pope Stephen II.

The Marquis Tedald of Canossa obtained (about 984) from the Church the possession for himself and his heirs, upon payment of a tribute. The decline of the House of Canossa was consummated with the death of the great countess Matilda of Canossa in 1115, just as the municipal institute was born and consolidated in Ferrara, which put an end to the ancient ducatus.

The free municipality of Ferrara survived for about 150 years. In 1208, Azzo VI d'Este became seignior of Ferrara. The House of Este extended their dominion over Modena (1288) and Reggio in 1289. Ferrara and its domains were formally part of the Papal States, while Modena and Reggio were part of the Holy Roman Empire. Therefore the lords of Este were vassals of the Pope for Ferrara, and of the emperor for Modena and Reggio.

Niccolò III (1393–1441) received several popes with great magnificence, especially Pope Eugene IV, who convened a council in Ferrara in 1438 (the council later moved to Florence). And in 1471, , shortly before his death, Borso d'Este, who from 1452 was already Duke of Modena and Reggio, obtained the title of Duke of Ferrara from Pope Paul II.

== History ==
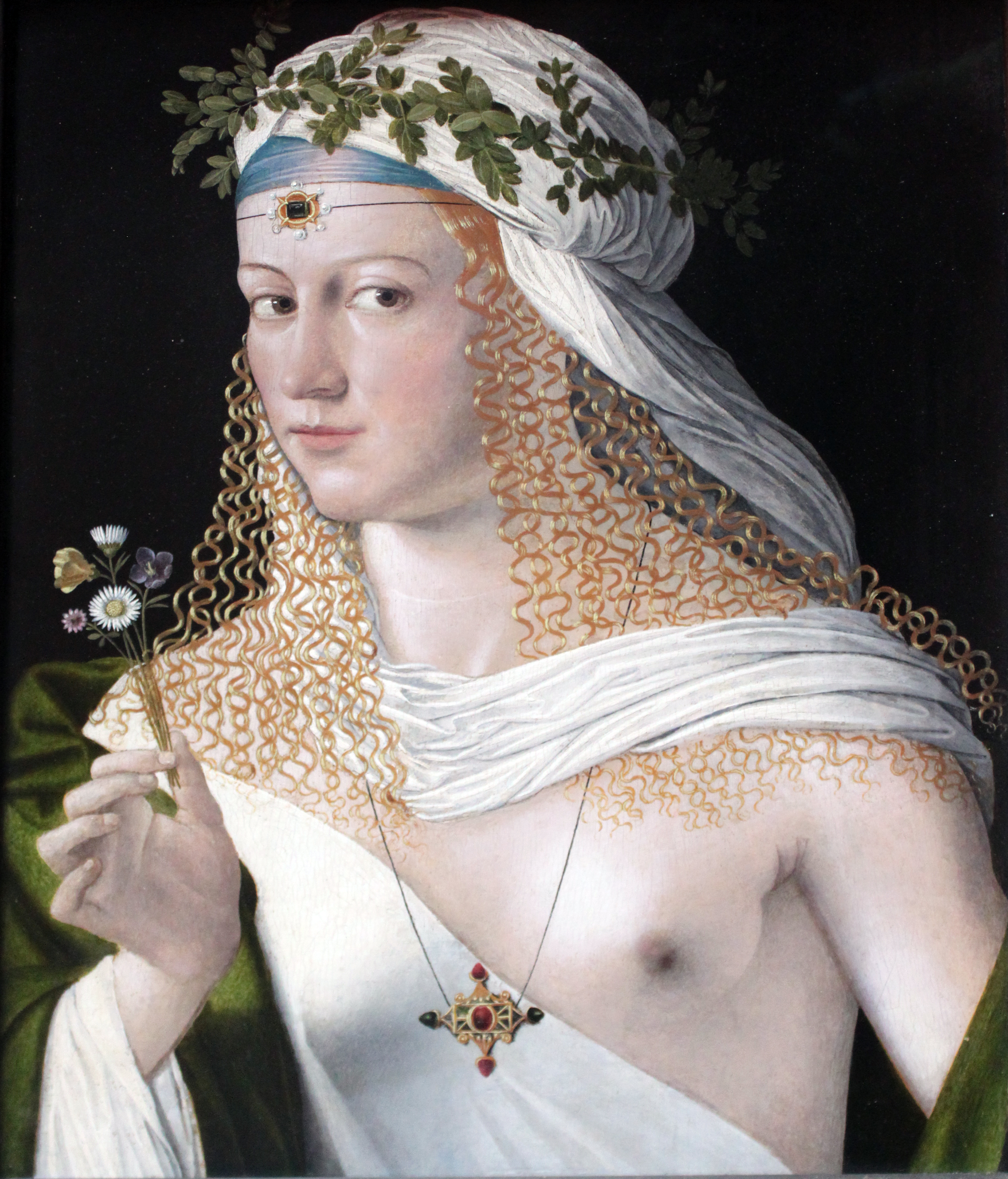
Portrait of a Woman by Bartolomeo Veneto, traditionally assumed to be Lucrezia Borgia

Ercole I d'Este was one of the most important patrons of the arts in late 15th- and early 16th-century Italy, along the Medicis and Pope Julius II. During his reign, Ferrara grew into an international cultural centre, renowned for its architecture, music, literature and visual arts. Ferrarese painters established links with Flemish artists and their techniques, exchanging influences in colours and composition choices.

Composers came to Ferrara from many parts of Europe, especially France and Flanders. Josquin des Prez worked for Duke Ercole for a time (producing the Missa Hercules dux Ferrariæ, which he wrote for him). Jacob Obrecht came to Ferrara twice (and died during an outbreak of plague there in 1505). Antoine Brumel served as principal court musician from 1505. Alfonso I, son of Ercole, was also an important patron; his preference for instrumental music resulted in Ferrara becoming an important centre of composition for the lute.

The architecture of Ferrara benefitted from the genius of Biagio Rossetti, who was asked in 1484 by Ercole I to redesign the plan of the city. The resulting "Addizione Erculea" is one of the most important and beautiful examples of Renaissance city planning and contributed to the selection of Ferrara as a World Heritage Site by UNESCO.

Alfonso married the notorious Lucrezia Borgia, and continued the war with Venice with success. In 1509 he was excommunicated by Pope Julius II, and he overcame the pontifical army in 1512 defending Ravenna. (Gaston de Foix fell in this battle, as an ally of Alfonso.) Lucrezia, together with other members of the Este house, is buried in the convent of Corpus Domini.

Alfonso made peace with the succeeding popes. He was the patron of Ariosto from 1518 onwards. His son Ercole II married Renée of France, daughter of Louis XII of France; he too embellished Ferrara during his reign (1534–1559).

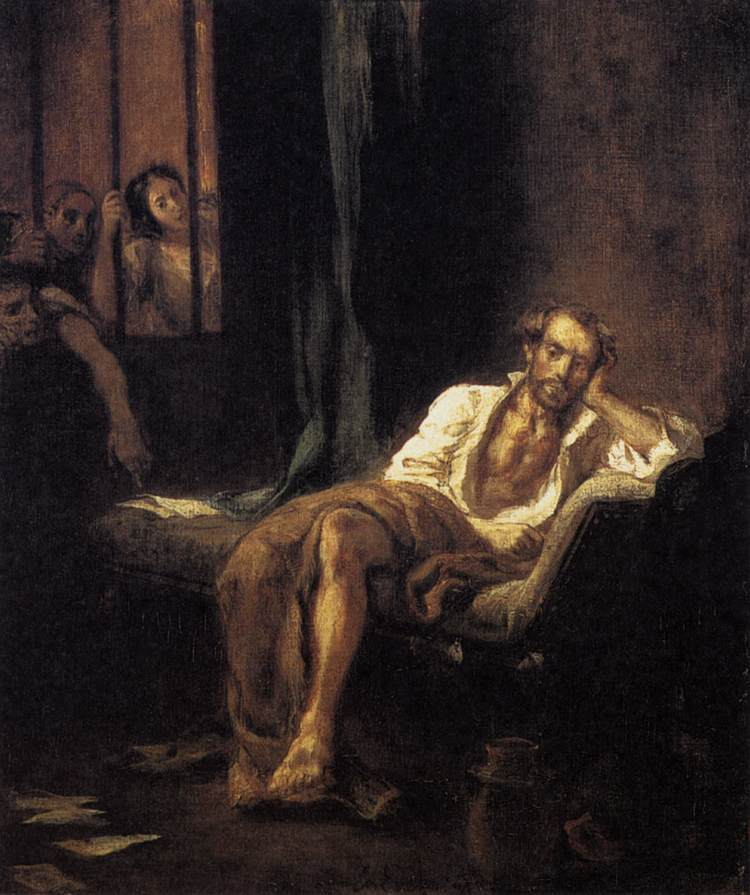
Torquato Tasso in the St. Ann's hospital of Ferrara, by Eugène Delacroix

His son Alfonso II married Lucrezia, daughter of grand-duke Cosimo I of Tuscany, then Barbara, sister of Emperor Maximilian II and finally Margherita Gonzaga, daughter of the Duke of Mantua. He raised the glory of Ferrara to its highest point, and was the patron of Tasso, Guarini, and Cremonini – favouring, as the princes of his house had always done, the arts and sciences. During the reign of Alfonso II, Ferrara once again developed an opulent court with an impressive musical establishment, rivaled in Italy only by the adjacent city of Venice, and the traditional musical centres such as Rome, Florence, and Milan. Composers such as Luzzasco Luzzaschi, Lodovico Agostini, and later Carlo Gesualdo, represented the avant-garde tendency of the composers there, writing for gifted virtuoso performers, including the famous concerto di donne — the three virtuoso female singers Laura Peverara, Anna Guarini, and Livia d'Arco. Vincenzo Galilei praised the work of Luzzaschi, and Girolamo Frescobaldi studied with him.

The city was much affected by the 1570 Ferrara earthquake.

When Alfonso died in 1597, he had no legitimate male heir. The Este lands were inherited by Alfonso's cousin Cesare d'Este. However, the succession was not acknowledged by Pope Clement VIII. Ferrara was claimed as a vacant fief by the Pope, as was Comacchio. The House of Este retained Modena and Reggio, which they held until 1796, apart from short interludes.

== Dukes of Ferrara ==
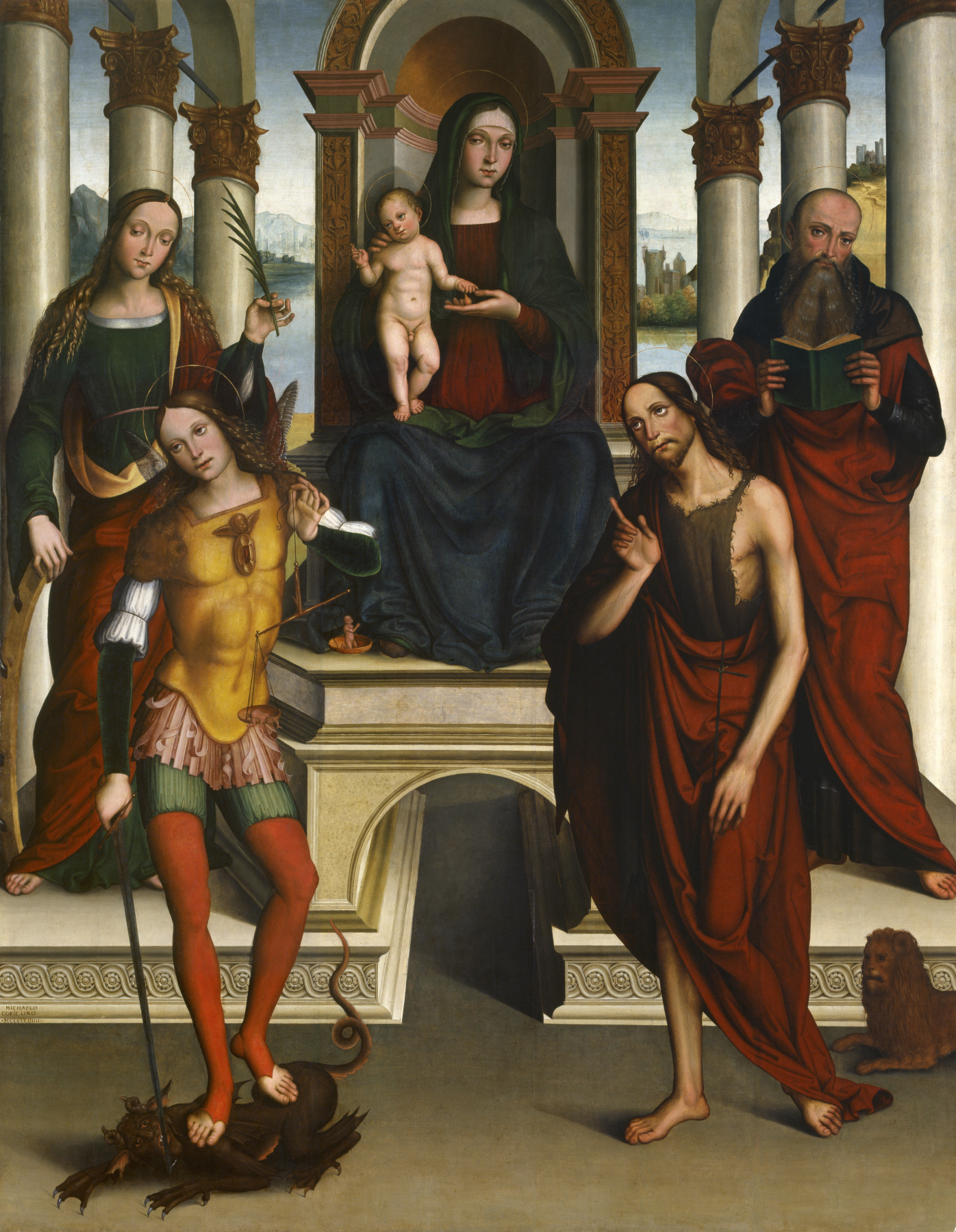
Altarpiece, by the artist Michele di Luca dei Coltellini, was once in the now ruined church of Sant'Andrea in Ferrara The Walters Art Museum.

- Borso 1471–1471 (Duke of Modena and Reggio from 1452, Duke of Ferrara from 1471)
- Ercole I 1471–1505
- Alfonso I 1505–1534
- Ercole II 1534–1559
- Alfonso II 1559–1597
  - 1597 – to the Papal States

== See also ==
- House of Este
- Historical states of Italy
- Duchy of Modena and Reggio

== Sources ==
- Trevor Dean, Land and Power in Late Medieval Ferrara: The Rule of the Este, 1350–1450.(Cambridge University Press) 1987.
- Cecily Booth, Cosimo I - Duke Of Florence, 1921, University Press
