= Genealogia dei principi d'Este =

Borso d'Este, from the Genealogia

A typical page from the Genealogia

The Genealogia dei principi d'Este ('Genealogy of the Princes of Este') is an illuminated manuscript on parchment bound as a codex and containing a genealogy of the House of Este. The manuscript has no title. The name by which it is now known is conventional.

The Genealogia contains 167 or 169 portrait medallions covering the Este family from Alberto Azzo II (d. 1097) to Isabella d'Este (b. 1474) plus four empty medallions for the next four children of Ercole I after Isabella down to Ippolito d'Este (b. 1479). The manuscript was thus produced in the period 1474–1479. Wives and illegitimate children are well represented. Each medallion is 6–7 centimetres (2.4–2.8 in) in diameter. All of the portraits are busts except Borso d'Este, who is depicted in full (outside of a medallion) on his own page. The artist of the Genealogia is unknown. He was a court painter, probably from the school of Bonifacio Bembo or Baldassare Estense. The iconography of the portraits is stereotyped and their artistic merit low.

On the death of Cardinal Alessandro d'Este in 1624, the manuscript passed to the Theatines and was subsequently dispersed. Part of it ended up back in the Biblioteca Estense after the extinction of the Theatines in 1782 (now Modena, Biblioteca Estense Universitaria, a.L.5.16 = Ital. 720), while another part was later acquired by the Biblioteca Nazionale Centrale (now Rome, Biblioteca Nazionale Centrale, fondo Vitt. Emanuele n. 293, cc. i-8-ii). The Modenese fragment is smaller (32 portraits) than the Roman (135).

== Editions ==
- Ernesto Milano and Mauro Bini, eds. Commentario al codice Genealogia dei principi d'Este. Modena: Il Bulino edizioni d'arte, 1996.
