= Gaia da Camino =

Italian noblewoman and poet

Coat of arms of the da Camino family

Gaia da Camino (c. 1270 – after 14 August 1311) was an Italian noblewoman and poet hailing from Treviso, Italy. Her family was descended from the Lombards. She is mentioned briefly in Dante Alighieri's Divine Comedy.

== Biography ==
Gaia da Camino was born around 1270 in Treviso. Her father was Gherardo III da Camino, and the identity of her mother is unknown. There was speculation that her mother was Gherardo's second wife, Chiara della Torre, but no official record of this exists.

The da Camino family was of Lombard heritage, and likely related to the Collalto family. During Gaia's lifetime, the da Camino family was in its prime, and she grew up knowing a lifestyle of prominence and wealth. Gaia's father, Gherardo, was known to entertain many guests who were prominent in the art world, including Dante Alighieri and the troubadour Ferrarino da Ferrara.

Gaia married her cousin, Tolberto III da Camino, sometime prior to the summer of 1291, with a substantial dowry. She was made the universal heiress of Frixa, another noblewoman likely from Treviso, in 1302. In 1309, Gaia and Tolberto were commended for their protection of Venetian lands in a letter written to them by the Venetian doge Pietro Gradenigo.

Gaia's will was drafted on 14 August 1311, and she died shortly thereafter.

== Poetry ==
Commentators of the Divine Comedy noted that Gaia was a renowned poet, and that she was among the earliest Italian women to compose poetry in Occitan. However, no poems written by Gaia survive to this day and support these statements. Therefore, some scholars have argued that this claim is inaccurate and only reflects the fact that the da Camino court was a lively hub that gathered poets, writers, and artists from northern Italy. Similar statements have been made for other debated medieval women poets, such as Nina Siciliana. Gaia has also been associated to the earlier female Italian poet, Compiuta Donzella.

== In the Divine Comedy ==
Gaia is mentioned in Dante's Divine Comedy at the terrace of wrath in Canto XVI of Purgatorio, the second canticle of Dante's Divine Comedy. In this terrace, Dante meets Marco Lombardo, an unidentified character from Lombardy, with whom he discusses topics such as the influence of the stars on human behavior and the relationship between religious and political power. As Marco reviews the political corruption in Lombardy, he notes that only three individuals make an exception: Corrado da Palazzo of Brescia, Guido da Castello of Reggio Emilia, and Gherardo, Gaia's father.

Despite the fact that the historical Dante had been a guest of the Da Camino in more than one occasion, the fictional Dante is not familiar with Gherardo and asks Marco who he is. In his reply, Lombardo refers to both Gherardo and Gaia.

"But who is this Gherardo, who, you say
Is left as an example of a race extinct,
Rebuking this barbaric age?'

'Either your speech deceives me,' he replied,
or it puts me to the test, for, speaking Tuscan,
how is it you know nothing of the good Gherardo?

'I know him by no other name unless
I were to take one from his daughter, Gaia.
May God be with you. I come with you no farther.

— Dante Alighieri, Purgatorio 16.133-141

Through Marco Lombardo, Gherardo is described as "good," attesting to the prospect that Dante thought highly of Gherardo. Dante associates Gaia with her father here as a commendation of virtue, and implies that Gaia's name was widely recognizable at his time.

Commentators of the Divine Comedy have further elaborated on Dante's reference to Gaia's notoriety by labeling her as either a dissolute woman (Jacopo della Lana, Benvenuto da Imola) or a paragon of virtue (Francesco da Buti, Cristoforo Landino). Other commentators (Giovanni da Serravalle) have hypothesized that this controversy regarding Gaia's personality was because two homonym women, both named Gaia da Camino, lived at the same time and had very different personalities.

== Legacy ==
Gaia's thirteenth-century residence, known as Casa Gaia, still stands in Portobuffolé, and is open to tourists. It includes a museum.
