= Alagia Fieschi =

Daughter of Count Nicolò Fieschi and niece of Pope Adrian V

Alagia Fieschi (died after 1334), also known as Alagia di Nicolò Fieschi and Alagia di Fieschi, was the daughter of Count Nicolò Fieschi and niece of Pope Adrian V. Alagia married Moroello Malaspina in the 1280s and they had five children. In Dante Alighieri's Divine Comedy, Alagia is remembered by Adrian V at the end of his conversation with Dante as the only virtuous woman in his family whom he wishes to pray on his behalf (Purgatorio, Canto XIX, 142-145). Alagia’s mention as the only virtuous person in her family reflects Dante’s view about Alagia's family's actions involving the Malaspina family. In addition, Alagia is celebrated by Dante through his portrayal of her as a virtuous woman whose prayer can contribute to Adrian V's journey of salvation.

== Life ==
=== Family ===
Coat of arms of the Fieschi family.

Alagia Fieschi descended from a wealthy Genoese family, the Fieschi, who expansively held land between Chiavari and Sestri. She was the daughter of Nicolò Fieschi, a count in the Fieschi family of Lavagna. She married Moroello Malaspina, who was the son of Manfredi di Giovagallo of the Spino Secco (a branch of the Malaspina family) at the end of the thirteenth century, seemingly around the 1280s. In her marriage with Moroello, Alagia had two daughters and three sons: Fiesca, Beatrice, Manfredi, Luchino and Giovanni. Fiesca was first married to the Dovadolan Count, Marcovaldo Guidi, the grandson of Guido Salvatico, and his marriage with Fiesca formed a kinship between the Malaspina and the Guidi family. Fiesca later married a lord of Montepulciano, Niccolò di Pecora. Beatrice was married to Alberto di Salinguerra Torelli, who was the son of a Ferrarian lord, Salinguerra Torelli, while her brother, Manfredi, married Alberto’s sister, Anna di Salinguerra Torelli. Little is known about Luchino and Giovanni.

Alagia had a sister named Fiesca, who also married to a Malaspinian, Alberto Malaspina, and a brother named Luca. Luca Fieschi was an influential cardinal at the Avignon papal court. Alagia was also the niece of Ottobono Fieschi (Pope Adrian V), brother of Nicolò di Fieschi. Sources also indicate that Alagia’s family, the Fieschi, were related to the Este family through Giacomina Feischi's marriage to a member of the Este family. There exist slightly different hypothesis of Giacomina’s relationship with Alagia. Twentieth-century Dante scholar, Paget Toynbee indicates that Giacomina was Alagia’s sister who was married to a Ferrarian marquis, Obizzo II di Este and was the mother of Beatrice di Este and Azzo VIII making Beatrice and Azzo VIII Alagia’s niece and nephew respectively. More recently, Marco Santagata has shown that Giacomina Fieschi was Adrian V’s sister and thus Alagia’s aunt, making Azzo VIII and Beatrice Alagia’s cousins.

Alagia di Fieschi's family lineage

Tedisio Fieschi
Nicolò Fieschi | Ottobuono Fieschi | Federico Fieschi | Giacomina Fieschi | Obizzo II d'Este
Alagia Fieschi | Moroello Malaspina | Fiesca Fieschi | Alberto Malaspina | Luca Fieschi | Eleonora Fieschi | Bernabò Doria | Azzo VII d'Este | Beatrice d'Este
Beatrice Malaspina | Alberto di Salinguerra Torelli | Fiesca Malaspina | Alberto di Salinguerra Torelli | Manfredi Malaspina | Anna di Salinguerra Torelli | Giovanni | Luchino

=== Meeting with Dante Alighieri ===
Alagia met Dante during his stay in Lunigiana in 1307. Dante had a positive relationship with the Malaspina family, and Moroello and Alagia were his patrons. Given the poet’s positive relationship with the couple, some scholars have raised the possibility that Moroello and Alagia could have assisted Dante in his introduction to the Avignon society via Alagia’s brother, Luca, although Dante's stay in Avignon is not historically proven.

=== Alagia's Life after 1315 ===
After the death of Moroello, in April 1315, Alagia headed to Genoa, near Castelletto, to reside in her sister in law’s house, Manfredina Malaspina, Moroello’s sister. The house was located near the Franciscan church in Genoa, in which both her husband and father were buried. At his demise in 1344, Alagia's son Luchino was also buried in the same church. Alagia is deemed to have spent most of her life in Manfredina’s house until the year Luchino died. However, around 1334, it is believed that Alagia had stayed in a family house in San Donato that initially belonged to her uncle, Adrian V, until he willed it to his brothers Federico Fieschi and Nicolò Fieschi in September 1275. Nicolò, Alagia’s father, had gained sole ownership of the property in 1315.

Some sources highlight records of Alagia’s economical activities and her engagement with her family members and beyond. In May 1327, her daughter Fiesca gave Alagia a thousand pounds, which she received as an inheritance from her late father, Moroello. Around a year later, in March 1328, Alagia lent, for a year, ten florins to Ugo Franscesco di Enrighini from Pontremoli. It is also inferred that a few years later, in June 1334, Alagia was given the legal right of significant portions of municipal public debt shares by her brother, Luca. In the events near her death presumably after 1344, Alagia rewrote her will to incorporate a transaction that aimed at returning what her daughter, Fiesca, had given her.

== In Literature ==
=== Alagia in Dante's Divine Comedy ===
In Purgatorio, the second canticle of Dante's Divine Comedy, Pope Adrian V, whom Dante meets in the fifth terrace of Mount Purgatory, speaks of Alagia by portraying her as the only virtuous woman in his family whose prayer can contribute to his salvation. He states:

On earth I have a niece called Alagia,

she is still virtuous, if indeed our house

has not by its example made her wicked,

and she alone is left to me back there.

(Nepote ho io di là c’ha nome Alagia,

buona da sé, pur che la nostra casa

non faccia lei per essempro malvagia,

e questa sola di là m’è rimasa.)

Purgatorio 19.142-45

The tone in which Adrian V speaks of Alagia is partly melancholic as it represents Alagia as a virtuous woman whom he worries about because she is surrounded by non-virtuous people. Alagia’s mention as the only virtuous person in her family contributes to the understanding of Dante’s view on certain historical events involving Alagia's family lineage and the Malaspina family. The Malaspina family were a noble family who were hospitable to Dante. He had a positive view of the family not just because they welcomed him but because he deemed them to be virtuous. Moreover, Alagia's husband was Dante's patron and friend, and Dante celebrated him in the Divine Comedy as "Vapor of Val di Magra" (Inferno 24.145) in which he is predicted to defeat the Pistoian Whites. Given Dante's positive view of the Malaspina family, by portraying Alagia as the only virtuous member of the Fieschi family, he not only condemns Alagia's relatives but also presents them as a "bad" for the Malaspina family.

This can be seen by reading the historical records on Alagia’s relatives against the grain of Dante’s treatment of them in the Divine Comedy. Alagia’s cousin, Beatrice d'Este, is mentioned in Purgatorio by Nino Visconti, her late husband, as a woman with a fickle heart who no longer loves him (Purgatorio 8.73-78). Here, Dante condemns Beatrice not because she remarried after Nino's death, but because she married Galeazzo Visconti, who was a member of the Ghibelline faction and an ally of the Doria family, thus making him an enemy of the Malaspinas. Beatrice’s brother, Azzo VIII, marquis of Ferrara, is mentioned in the Divine Comedy as being guilty of patricide and having negotiated his daughter’s marriage, provoking the creation of a coalition group with an anti-Este sentiment and rebels against Modena and Reggio. Moreover, Azzo VIII was an enemy of Dante’s friend, Moroello, as Azzo VIII fought against Moroello when Moroello was the elected capital-general of the Guelf of Bologna in 1297. Finally, Alagia’s cousin Elenora Fieschi was married to Bernabò Doria, who was son of Branca Doria. Branca Doria, whom Dante placed in the third ring of Cocytus as a traitor of guests in the Divine Comedy, led the violent occupation of a Malaspinian castle in Lerici in 1307.

Dante's mention of Alagia, therefore, offers a glimpse into his views on certain historical events, but his celebration of Alagia as a virtuous woman is also a noteworthy element. Dante celebrates Alagia, a woman who welcomed him during his exile, as a virtuous woman whose prayer can help Adrian V’s journey in salvation. Pope Adrian V speaks of his niece, Alagia, in a "delicate" tone as the only person who can help accelerate his journey in Purgatorio through her extension of prayer. In the Divine Comedy, Dante stresses the importance of prayer of those on earth on behalf of the deceased for achieving salvation. Most prayers "originate with women," as Dante believes that women through their prayer extend their love and can miraculously help the salvation of men. In addition to Alagia, Constance of Aragon, Joanna of Gallura and Nella Donati, who are remembered by Manfred of Hohenstaufen, Nino Visconti and Forese Donati respectively, are involved in a similar process of devotional transaction. More specifically, Alagia and Joanna of Gallura are referred as the only remaining virtuous women in their respective families and who are therefore able to pray for their late family members. Their role as women who remained gracious and virtuous despite being surrounded by bad influence is celebrated as a feature which further contributes to the effectiveness of their prayer.
