= Tolberto III da Camino =

Italian nobleman and military leader (1263–1317)

- Italian nobleman
- Other titles: Podestà of Belluno; podestà of Treviso
- Born: 1263
- Died: 1317 (aged 53–54)
- Noble family: Da Camino
- Spouse: Gaia da Camino
- Father: Guecellone VI da Camino
- Occupation: Nobleman, military leader

Tolberto III da Camino (1263–1317) was an Italian nobleman and military leader, a member of the Da Camino family.

== Biography ==
The son of Guecellone VI da Camino, he was allied with his cousin Gherardo III da Camino when the latter became lord of Treviso in 1283. In exchange, he received the castles of Oderzo, Camino and Motta di Livenza, which he maintained after some controversies rose a few years later. In 1286 he was podestà of Belluno, while five years later he led an unsuccessful plot against Gherardo together with his brother Biaquino VI and the bishop of Belluno. The two brothers asked protection to the doge of Venice Pietro Gradenigo: in exchange, they ceded Motta di Livenza to the Venetians, starting the Republic's expansion in the Veneto mainland.

The two later occupied some territories near Prodolone in the Patriarchate of Aquileia, for which they were excommunicated by the patriarch. The latter, namely Raimondo Della Torre, withdrew the excommunication in September 1293, following the establishment of an arbitral tribunal which ascertained the damage caused by the two to the Church of Aquileia. After fasting on bread and water, the brothers had to promise never to cross the Livenza again, the natural border line between the Camino territories and Friuli.

In his late life Tolberto reconciled with Gherardo, whose daughter Gaia he married to. In 1299 he became podestà of Treviso. After Gherardo's death and the succession of Rizzardo IV da Camino, he supported the latter's brother Guecellone VII (1312): however, a few months later he supported the plot which forced Guecellone to leave Treviso, effectively ending the Da Camino's lordship in Treviso.

In 1317 he fought alongside the Trevigiani troops against Cangrande della Scala and the Count of Gorizia, but died suddenly in the same year.

== Sources ==
- Angella, Enrica; Pietro Bongi (1993). Sulle terre dei da Camino. Pieve da Soligo: Bubola & Naibo.
- Josef Riedmann (1974). "Camino, Tolberto da". Dizionario Biografico degli Italiani (in Italian). Vol. 17: Calvart–Canefri. Rome: Istituto dell'Enciclopedia Italiana. ISBN 978-88-12-00032-6.
- Bernardi, Jacopo (1845). La Civica aula Cenedese con li suoi dipinti gli storici monumenti e la serie illustrata de' Vescovi. Ceneda: Domenico Cagnani.
- Circolo vittoriese di ricerche storiche (2002). I Da Camino. Capitani di Treviso Feltre e Belluno, Signori di Serravalle e del Cadore. Atti del 2º Convegno Nazionale 20 aprile 2002. Godega di Sant'Urbano: De Bastiani.
- Picotti, Giovanni Battista (1975) [1905]. I Caminesi e la loro signoria in Treviso. Roma: Multigrafica Editrice.
- Verci, Giambattista (1786). Storia della Marca Trivigiana e Veronese. Venezia: Storti.
