= Ferrarino Trogni da Ferrara =

Italian poet

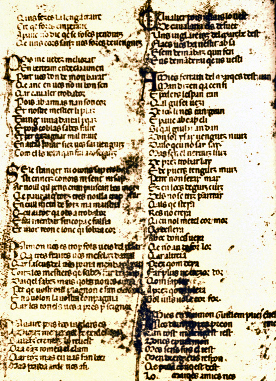
Ferrarino's tenso with Raimon Guillem. It is the right column, Raimon's stanza begins with an initial A and the next initial A begins Ferrarino's.

Ferrari da Ferrara, fully Ferrarino (dei) Trogni da Ferrara, was a troubadour of Ferrara in the late 13th and early 14th centuries. He was a composer, anthologist, and possibly autobiographer. He was one of the last active troubadours in Italy.

== Poetry ==
=== Florilegium ===
Ferrarino is best known as the compiler of a florilegium of Occitan lyric poetry appended to the end of manuscript D, an Italian chansonnier of 1254. He was also a poet himself. His vida was placed atop his florilegium. Both were written in Italy. From this biography we know that he composed no more than two cansos and one retroensa (or retroncha), yet he was also a composer of sirventes and couplets, but what this contradiction in the vida means is probably that he compiled the best sirventes and extracted couplets from them.

From his choice of excerpts for his florilegium can be derived another characteristic of Ferrarino the poet: a preference for moralising and didactic works. If he was, as his vida indicates, already old when he sojourned at the Da Camino court in Treviso, it may be that he composed his short anthology for Gherardo III da Camino (Giraldo or Girardo), in order to instruct his three children: the celebrated Gaia of Dante Alighieri's Divina Commedia, Rizzardo, and Guecellone. That there were didactic Occitan poets in Italy is known: Uc Faidit composed his Donat there and Terramagnino da Pisa his Doctrina. On the other hand, Ferrarino's florilegium may have been written without a specific purpose or with a general purpose in mind. Or it may have been intended for a private student, one Tuisio or Tuixio, later a master (fl. 1302). Some of these works may be "Italian" masked in Provençal orthography in order to teach the latter to a young pupil. Ferrarino, who is called doctor proençalium and said by his biographer to sab molt be letras (know many good letters), could have been a teacher of Occitan and Latin (letras means "Latin").

=== Tenso ===
Of Ferrarino's work we only possess one cobla of a tenso composed in Italy with Raimon Guillem. It was added to the florilegium, so Ferrarino's vida relates, only later by the book's owner, who wished his anthologist to be remembered. From the little of his work which survives, however, it can be gleaned that Ferrarino was an able lyricist in the academic Occitan he had acquired, and his original structures merit his works' inclusion in the corpus of trobar clus. In his lost works, however, he may have abandoned this defining characteristic (clus), so unusual of the Italian troubadours.

== Biography ==
=== Identification ===
A certain "Ferrarino, maestro di grammatica", of the Trogni family of Ferrara, mentioned in 1330, has been identified with the troubadour. This lengthens the poet's life considerably, but there is a reference in a juramentum fidelitatis praestitum anno 1310 a populo ferrariense Clementi pp. V (an oath of fealty of the people of Ferrara to Pope Clement V in 1310) to a Magister Ferrarinus doctor grammatice ("Master Ferrarino, doctor of grammar") and Guicardus (or Guiçardus) filius dicti magistri Ferrarini ("Guizzardo, son of the aforementioned master Ferrarino"). It is generally accepted that this is the same Maistre Ferari de Feirara of the florilegium and this pushes his dates back at least to 1310, making the 1330 reference probable. The father and son who took the oath to the pope were said to be contrata sexti Sancti Romani: proprietors of a sixth of San Romano.

Ferrarino is probably also the Ferrarino dei Trogni, son of Bartolomeo, found in Padua in 1317, 1325, and 1330. This Ferrarino had a son, Guizzardo, who appears in an Este document of 1313: Ego Guiçardus filius magistri Ferarini de Trongnis de Ferraria doctoris gramatice sacri palatij notarius ("I, Guizzardo, son of the master Ferari de Trogni de Ferraria, doctor of grammar and notary of the sacred palace [i.e. Holy See]"). Thus, the troubadour was Ferrarino Trogni da Ferrara and he lived in Padua as late as 1330. This thus forms an important date in Italian Occitan literature, being one of the last datable events concerning a troubadour.

=== Vida ===
In his vida is written qan ven ch'el fo veil … anava a Trevis a meser Guiraut da Chamin et a sos filz ("when he became old, he did not travel much except to go to Treviso to [see] Milord Giraut de Chamin and his sons"). If thus Ferrarino was old when he came to the Trevisan court, an even that must have occurred before Gherardo's death on 26 March 1307, he must have been very old (probably over eighty) at the time of his death in 1330 or later. Of his last years we know nothing and he was probably living when his biography was composed. He may have even narrated it himself.

The vida is highly laudatory of Ferrarino's contributions to Occitan poetry. "[H]e understood better how to invent (trobaire) poems in Provençal [i.e. Occitan] than any other man who was ever in Lombardy," or so his biographer says. He was also reputed for his understanding of the language, for his writing (probably including penmanship), and for his composition of "good and beautiful books". He partook of court culture at the Este court in Ferrara, his hometown, for many years, there becoming something of a champion to whom any other aspiring troubadours would consult him for literary/linguistic advice, calling him their "master".

The vida also contains the expected reference to a love interest. Ferrarino was said in his youth to have loved a lady Turcla, obviously of the house of Turchi (or Turcli). He performed many good deeds for her. In his later life he moved from the Este court to the Caminesi at Treviso, where he was accepted on account of the friendship between the two families.

== Sources ==
- Bertoni, Giulio. I Trovatori d'Italia: Biografie, testi, tradizioni, note. Rome: Società Multigrafica Editrice Somu, 1967 [1915].
- The Vidas of the Troubadours. Margarita Egan, trans. New York: Garland, 1984. ISBN 0-8240-9437-9.
