= Ottobuono di Razzi =

Italian clergyman and feudal lord

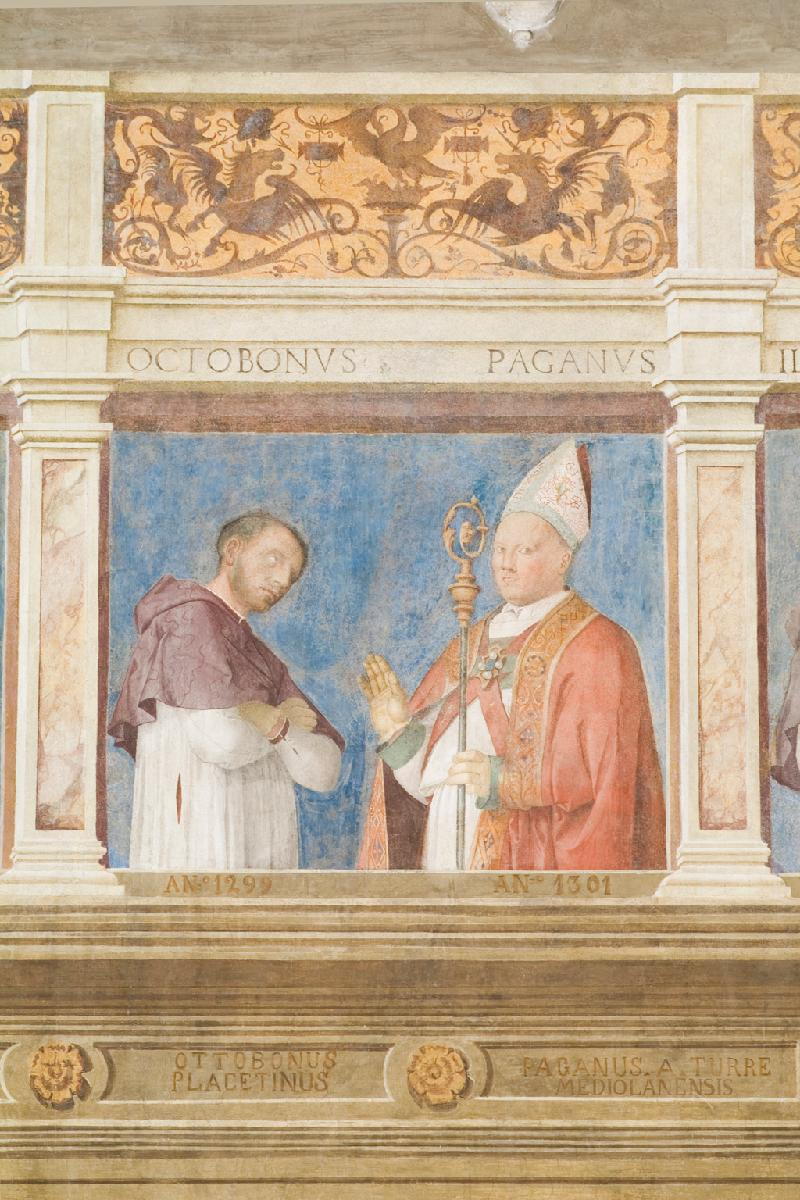
Ottobuono (left) and his successor, Pagano della Torre, in a painting by Bartolomeo Montagna now in the diocesan museum of Padua

Ottobuono di Razzi (died 3 January 1315) was an Italian clergyman and feudal lord, who was Patriarch of Aquileia from 1302 until his death.

A native of the Piacenza region, he was first bishop of Padua. He received the title of patriarch (with secular lordship above Friuli and other regions of north-eastern Italy) in 1302, although his appointment was contested by Gherardo III da Camino, lord of Treviso, and other local vassals.

In 1305-1310 he fought mostly against the Da Camino; in 1309 the latter conquered Saciletto and San Vito, menacing Cividale and forcing Ottobuono to flee first to Grado, and then to Venice. The situation changed when Henry III of Gorizia, so far allied with the da Camino, switched his allegiance to the patriarch, who named him general captain. Rizzardo IV da Camino was gradually pushed back from Friuli, until he died in 1313.

In 1311 Ottobuono accompanied emperor Henry VII in his return to Germany, and took part in the Council of Vienne. Ottobuono died in 1315 during a trip to Avignon, in the family castle of Arguto.

Catholic Church titles
Preceded by Pietro Gerra	Patriarch of Aquileia; 1302-1315	Succeeded by Gillo of Villalta
