= A Question of Attribution =

Stage play and television film by Alan Bennett

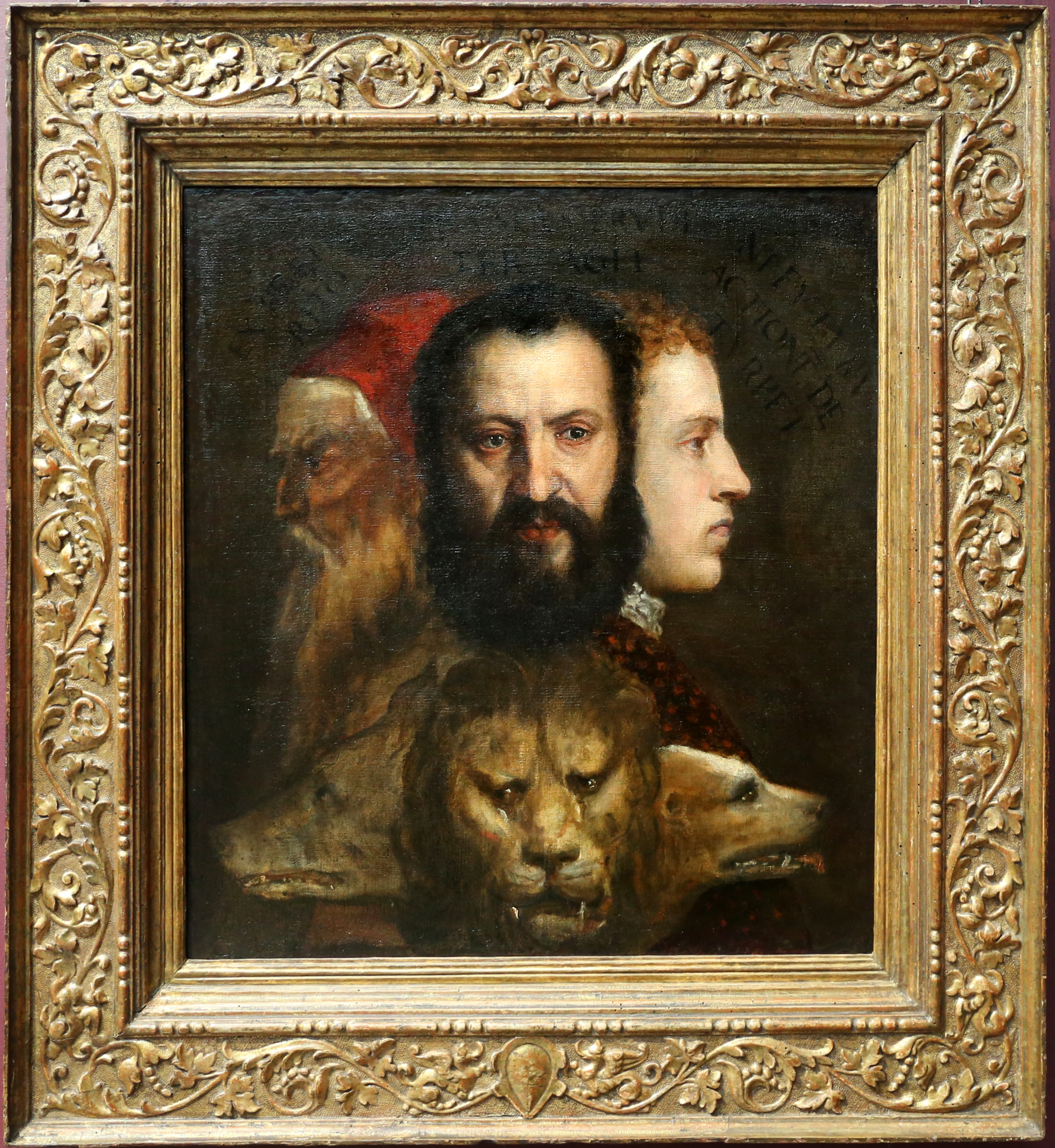
Allegory of Prudence by Titian, c. 1550–1565

A Question of Attribution is a 1988 one-act stage play, written by Alan Bennett. It focuses on the British art expert and former Soviet agent Sir Anthony Blunt. It was premiered at the National Theatre, London, on 1 December 1988, directed by Simon Callow. The stage version of An Englishman Abroad, about Blunt's fellow agent Guy Burgess, was also performed on the same bill. The two plays are collectively called Single Spies.

The play was adapted as a 1991 television film of the same name directed by John Schlesinger and broadcast as part of the BBC's Screen One series. The film was produced by Innes Lloyd, a long-time collaborator of the author in his television work, and is dedicated to Lloyd's memory in a title card at the beginning of the end credits. The New York Times called the film a "razor-sharp psychological melodrama" and it won the 1992 BAFTA TV award for Best Single Drama.

== Plot ==
The play and subsequent film are based on Blunt's role in the Cambridge Spy Ring and, as Surveyor of the Queen's Pictures, personal art adviser to Queen Elizabeth II. It portrays his interrogation by an MI5 officer, his work researching and conserving art works, his role as Director of the Courtauld Institute, and his acquaintance with the Queen. Bennett described the piece as an "inquiry in which the circumstances are imaginary but the pictures are real."

While supervising the restoration of a dual portrait in which only partial attribution to Titian is thought credible, Blunt discovers a third figure that had been painted over by an unknown artist, and concludes by comparison with a better known triple portrait in London's National Gallery (Allegory of Prudence) that the newly revealed third figure was Titian's son. As Blunt's public exposure as a spy in 1979 draws near, the play suggests that he has been made a scapegoat to protect others in the security service. At the end of the film, the time of Blunt's exposure, Blunt tells Chubb that X-rays had revealed the presence of a fourth and fifth man.

One of the sub-texts in the scene with the Queen is whether or not Her Majesty knew that Blunt was a former Soviet spy. They briefly discuss the Dutch Vermeer forger Han van Meegeren, and how his paintings now look like fakes, but were accepted as genuine in the early-1940s, and touch on the nature of fakes and secrets. After she has left and an assistant asks what they were talking about, Blunt replies "I was talking about art. I'm not sure that she was."

== Casts ==
	National Theatre, 1988	BBC Television, 1991
Blunt	Alan Bennett	James Fox
Restorer	David Terence	John Cater
Chubb	Simon Callow	David Calder
Phillips	Crispin Redman	Mark Payton
Colin	Brett Fancy	Jason Flemyng
The Queen ("HMQ")	Prunella Scales	

Source: Playscript and BBC.

== Radio ==
The play was adapted for radio, in 2006, with Edward Petherbridge as Blunt and Prunella Scales as The Queen.

== See also ==
- Cambridge Spies, a 2003 BBC TV series about the Cambridge Ring, and how Blunt came to be a Soviet agent.

== References and sources ==
=== Sources ===
- Bennett, Alan (1990). Single Spies: Two Plays about Guy Burgess and Anthony Blunt; Talking Heads: Six Monologues. New York and London: Summit. ISBN 978-0-671-69249-0.
