= Nino Visconti =

Judge in Gallura (pre-state Italy)

Ugolino Visconti
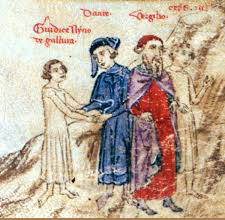
- Judge Nino Visconti with Dante Alighieri and Virgil

Judge/King of Gallura
- Reign: 1275–1296
- Predecessor: John
- Successor: Joanna
- Born: 1265; Pisa
- Died: August 1296 (aged 30–31); Gallura, Sardinia
- Spouse: Beatrice d'Este
- Issue: Joanna, Queen of Gallura
Names
- Ugolino Visconti
- House: Visconti (Sardinia branch)
- Father: John, King of Gallura
- Mother: [Chiara?] della Gherardesca

Ugolino Visconti (died 1296), better known as Nino, was the giudice of Gallura from 1275 or 1276 to his death. He was a son of Giovanni Visconti and grandson of Ugolino della Gherardesca. He was the first husband of Beatrice d'Este, daughter of Obizzo II d'Este. His symbol was a cock (canting arms on Gallura from Latin: gallus="a cock, rooster").

Nino succeeded his father in Gallura in 1275 or 1276 and spent most of his life alternating time in Pisa and Gallura. His chaplain, a friar named Gomita, was caught taking bribes to release prisoners and so Nino had him hanged. Gomita was placed in the eighth circle of Hell in the Inferno. Nino was commended for his act of justice and piety.

In 1288, he began to share power with his grandfather in Pisa, but the two quarreled. The elder Ugolino tried to enlist the archbishop Ruggieri degli Ubaldini to expel Nino from the city, but the archbishop instead exiled them both and appointed his own podestà and capitano del popolo. Then a Pisan army was sent to take control of Nino's giudicato. The betrayed giudice never set foot in his giudicato again. However, after his exile, Nino Visconti counterattacked Pisa with Genoa, Lucca and the Florentine Guelfs.

In 1293, peace was made and Nino later died in Sardinia. His daughter Joanna succeeded to the title of Gallura and married Rizzardo IV da Camino, Count of Ceneda and Lord of Treviso.

== Role in Dante's Divine Comedy ==
Dante Alighieri was a friend to Nino Visconti. According to historians, they may have become friendly with each other when Nino lived out part of his exile in Florence. Nino was also the cousin of Moroello Malaspina, with whom Dante was on good terms.

Nino appears in Dante's Divine Comedy. In the eighth canto of Purgatorio, to his mild surprise, Dante meets Nino in the region of Purgatory outside St. Peter's gate. This area was devoted to the souls of those who neglected their spiritual welfare for the sake of their country. Here they are detained for a period equal to their earthly lifetimes, before beginning their purgation.

When they meet, Dante describes his journey, and that he is not actually dead. As they speak, Dante refers to him as "giudice Nin gentil" or "Noble Judge Nino". Dante remarks how glad he is to see that Nino is here, and not in hell. Nino Visconti mentions that his widow, Beatrice, remarried with Galeazzo I Visconti, duke of Milan, into the Milanese branch of the Visconti. Because of this travesty, Nino complains to Dante that his widow does not love or respect him anymore. He asks Dante to remind Giovanna, his nine-year-old daughter, to pray for him. Nino then continues to express his disgust at the Milanese and his widow. He tells Dante that in her death, she will no longer be associated with his family's symbol, the rooster. He sees as a great loss for her, and directly comments on his disgust at how quickly women move on from their husbands. This comment is very similar to an excerpt from Virgil's Aeneid, furthering the parallels between Dante's writing and Virgil's works.

=== Critical reception of Dante's Nino Visconti ===
There have been many investigations into the importance of Nino Visconti in Dante's work. Some critics claim that Nino represents the independence and peace of mind characteristic of Purgatorio, which serves as a contrast from Inferno. This is because Dante makes Nino appear so sure of his path. There have also been connections drawn between Nino and Forese Donati, who appears later on. Both have similar conversations about the women in their life, and both foster a close bond to Dante. Although Nino speaks harshly of his wife, this is justified by Dante, as Dante deems his cause worthy enough. Again there is the notion of him being "truthful" as the "Noble Judge"—he is exposing the truth of his life to Dante. However, Dante emphasizes that Nino is only explaining God's righteous decisions for Beatrice and that he only cares for God's judgement of her acts.

Nino's family is also interpreted as bearing a symbolic significance. Many commentators agree that Nino's daughter and wife may represent a Mary and Eve dynamic. Giovanna fits the archetype of Mary, especially in the fact that she prays for her father as a young girl. Beatrice, on the other hand, is compared to Eve due to her fall from ladyhood. Because of her remarriage, there is what many see as extreme misogyny in descriptions of her. Soon after Nino's death, she is described to be without her wimple (widow's headpiece), which Nino sees as being shameful. It is commonly agreed that Nino's character uses Beatrice to broadly criticize the women of the time. Furthermore, Beatrice's infidelity is akin to the serpent that appears in this canto. This is due to her promiscuity, which is explained as symbolism of original sin. Also, since Beatrice remarried a Ghibelline while Nino was a Guelf, she is seen as remarrying with a political and personal disloyalty.

== Nino Visconti in other works ==
Nino was also an acquaintance of several troubadours. At least two Occitan works are addressed to him. The two Occitan works mentioned, are anonymous coblas that appear towards the end of an Italian chansonnier of 1310. One cobla, Mand qe iur e non periur was addressed al iuge de Galur, that is, Nino, and has sometimes been ascribed to Paolo Lanfranchi da Pistoia.

The cobla which appears immediately after it in the chansonnier is also addressed to Nino but has not been assigned by any scholar to Paolo. Terramagnino da Pisa, a native of Pisa's peninsular territories, was frequently present in Gallura, where he probably spent most of his adult life. His Doctrina de Cort was addressed to Nino, at whose court it may have been written. Another Occitan poet with whom Nino had contact was Luchetto Gattilusio. Gattilusio acquired property interests in Sardinia and appeared in several documents pertaining to Nino's rule.

| Preceded by John | Giudice of Gallura; 1275–1298 | Succeeded by Joanna |
