= Alagia =

Alagia or Alagía is a name. It can be both a given name and a surname, and can be found in both Italy and the United States.

Notable people with this name include:

- Alagia Fieschi (fl. 1300s), an Italian noblewoman
- John Alagía, an American musician
- Tiziana Alagia (born 1973), a retired Italian runner

== See also ==
- Alagiah, a similarly spelled Tamil name
