= Biaquino II da Camino =

Italian nobleman and military leader

Biaquino II da Camino (c. 1220 – July 1274) was an Italian nobleman and military leader, a member of the da Camino family and lord of Treviso.

He is mentioned for the first time in 1233, when the family's lands near Treviso were confiscated after his cousin Guecellone V had been identified as the instigator of the assassins of Marino Dandolo. Biaquino was then part of a league formed against the Trevigiani together with Guecellone and his brother Tolberto II, the cities of Conegliano, Ceneda and Vicenza, the bishops of Belluno and Feltre, and the patriarch of Aquileia.

In 1239, Treviso went to the Guelph Alberico da Romano thanks to his support, and Biaquino was podestà of the city from 1241 to 1243. He also took part on the Guelph side at the siege of Ferrara in 1240. At Guecellone's death, Tolberto sided for the Ghibellines of Ezzelino III da Romano, and Biaquino became one of the area's main Guelph leaders, leading the army of Treviso against Padua and defending Feltre and Belluno. Once both emperor Frederick II and Ezzelino had died (1259), Biaquino reconciled with the Ghibellines of his family: the family's lands were divided, and he received the Cadore (whose rights he had obtained from Bertold of Andrechs, patriarch of Aquileia) and some fiefs in the Ceneda county.

In 1260-1270, he supported the Guelph party in the internal struggles of the commune of Treviso, opening to the road to power to his son Gherardo, whom he had from his first wife, India di Gherardo da Camposampiero.
