= Vecellio =

Vecellio is an Italian surname, and may refer to:

- Cesare Vecellio (c. 1530–1601), Italian painter
- Francesco Vecellio (c. 1485–1560), Italian painter
- Marco Vecellio (1545-1611), Italian painter
- Orazio Vecellio (c. 1528–1576), Italian painter
- Tiziano Vecellio (c. 1485–1576), Italian painter known as Titian
