= Guecellone VII da Camino =

Italian nobleman and lord of Treviso

Guecellone VII da Camino (c. 1275 – 1324) was an Italian nobleman and lord of Treviso.

== Biography ==
The second son of Gherardo III da Camino, he was initially destined to the ecclesiastical career. After the assassination of his elder brother and lord of Treviso, Rizzardo IV da Camino, in which Guecellone perhaps took part, he became General Captain of Treviso. He continued the pro-Guelph stand of his father, keeping good relationships with the Patriarchate of Aquileia and the Republic of Venice, and supporting the Paduans against Cangrande della Scala, lord of Verona. He later changed side, and allied with the Veronese Alboino I della Scala.

His unsteady conduct caused the Trevigiani people to rebel against him, under the leadership of Rambaldo di Collato: Guecellone was forced to flee the city, ending the family's lordship in Treviso after 29 years (15 December 1312). In 1317, with the help of Cangrande della Scala, he besieged the city and the bishop's castle of San Martino at Ceneda, but in vain. Later he reconciled with the bishops, being confirmed by the latter in the investiture of Feltre, Ceneda and Cadore, which had been conquered by Cangrande the previous year. The following year, he was excommunicated by the pope due to a dispute about his brother's testament.

He died at Serravalle in 1324.

== Sources ==
- Angella, Enrica; Pietro Bongi (1993). Sulle terre dei da Camino. Pieve da Soligo: Bubola & Naibo.
