= Pietro Gerra =

Italian ecclesiastic

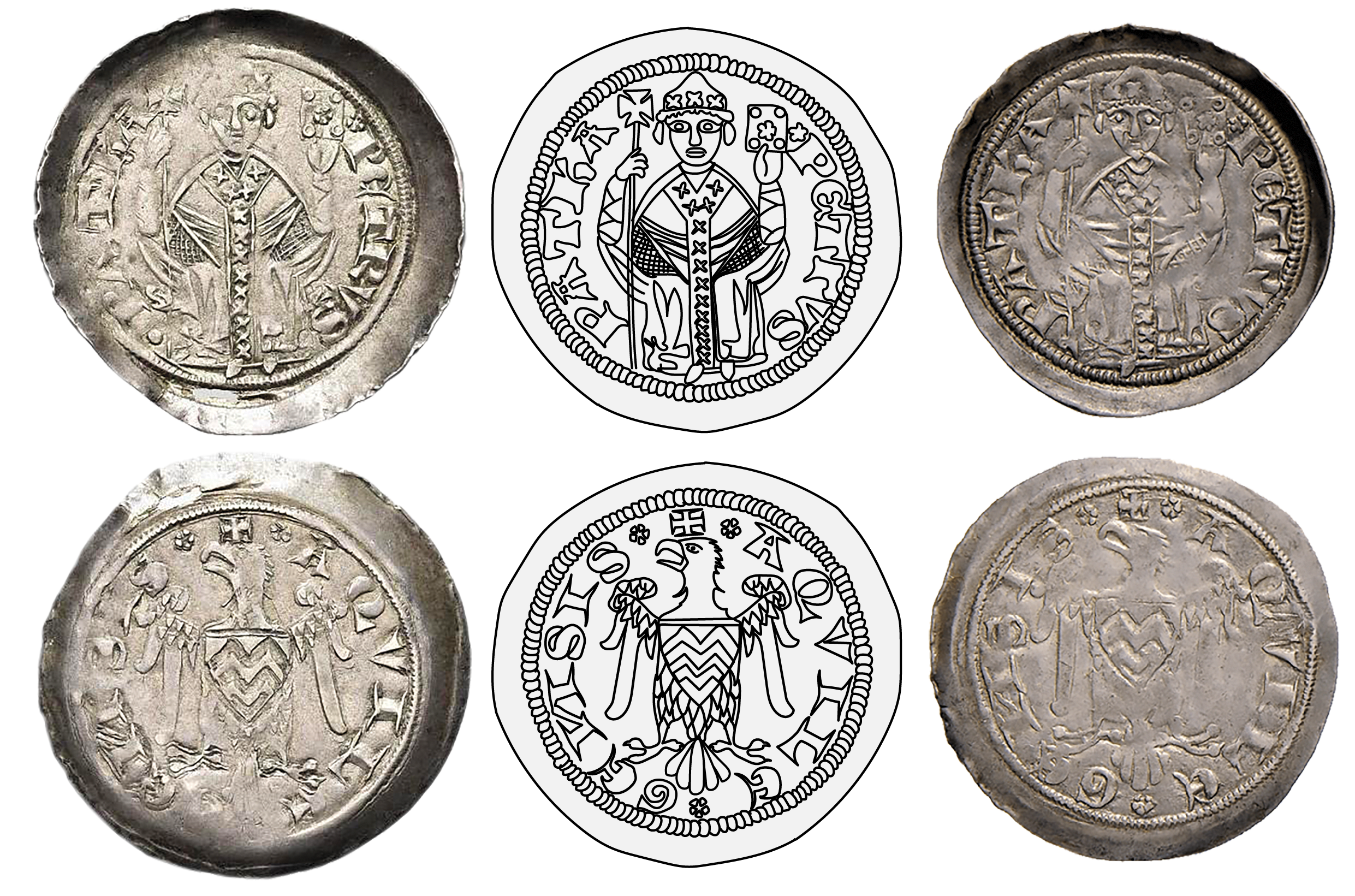
Coins minted by Gerra as patriarch

Pietro Gerra or Guerra (d. 19 February 1301) was an Italian ecclesiastic who held a series of important posts. He was born in the first half of the thirteenth century at Ferentino, where he became a canon of the local cathedral. He was later appointed to a chaplaincy in the Roman curia before being consecrated bishop of Sora (20 April 1267). On 2 August 1278 he was transferred to the diocese of Rieti, where he built the episcopal palace. He was promoted to the archdiocese of Monreale in Sicily on 22 July 1286 and consecrated 20 August 1286. Between 1296 and 1298, he served as the apostolic administrator of the diocese of Nola. He had the favour of Pope Boniface VIII, who appointed him papal legate in the Romagna and then, on 6 January 1298, appointed him archbishop of Capua. His final move was on 8 July 1299 to the Patriarchate of Aquileia, a prestigious office with extensive temporalities. He disputed jurisdiction with the Republic of Venice over certain tenants whose lands had been occupied by republican troops. Pope Boniface arbitrated a resolution.

== Sources ==
- Ellero, Gianfranco (1974). Storia dei friulani. Udine: Grafiche Fulvio.
- Gèrra, Pietro Enciclopedie on line. Treccani.

Catholic Church titles
Preceded by Raimondo della Torre	Patriarch of Aquileia; 1299-1301	Succeeded by Ottobuono di Razzi
