= Terramagnino da Pisa =

Italian composer

Terramagnino da Pisa was a Pisan author in Italian and Occitan of the second half of the 13th century. In Italian he wrote lyric poetry and in Occitan he penned the famous Doctrina de cort, basically a condensed form of the Razos de trobar of Raimon Vidal. Because his Doctrina is composed in verse, and conjecturing from his surviving Italian lyrics, he is sometimes classified as a troubadour, though none of his Occitan lyrics survive.

His Occitan name was Teramayguis or Teramaygnis de Piza, as he himself recorded in his Doctrina, addressed to Nino Visconti, Judge of Gallura. This was probably not a first name, as some scholars have thought, but rather an indicator that he came from Pisan territory, which suggests his birthplace was in peninsular Italy (near Pisa), yet his home to be in Sardinia, where he undoubtedly composed his main work.

This work, however, was badly handled by copyists, with the result that the surviving manuscripts of the Doctrina are riddled with errors, unclear, and inaccessible. What can be gleaned, however, suffices to demonstrate that Terramagnino's work lacked originality. His Occitan, too, is not he best and there are Italianisms. Italian cities (like Pisa, Lucca, Florence, Genoa, and Piacenza) also appear often. Terramagnino also alludes to Paolo Lanfranchi de Pistoja and Dante da Majano, proving a connexion with peninsular Occitan poets.

Terramagnino may be the same person as the author of an obscure sonnet, "Poi dal mastro Guitton latte tenete", addressed to a Guidonian of the "Tuscan school". The Guidonian scholar replied with an even more obscure poem of his own, following Terramagnino's rime, but citing the authority of Saint Jerome. This has led to some speculation that Terramagnino's Christian name was Girolamo or Gerolamo.

== Sources ==
- Bertoni, Giulio (1915). I Trovatori d'Italia: Biografie, testi, tradizioni, note. Rome: Società Multigrafica Editrice Somu.
- Poe, Elizabeth W. (2002). "Cantairitz e trobairitz: A Forgotten Attestation of Old Provençal »Trobairitz«". Romanische Forschungen. 114 (2): 206–15.
