= Alagiah =

Alagiah (Tamil: அழகையா) is a Tamil name. It can be both a given name and a surname. Notable people with this name include:

- Alagiah Thurairajah (1934–1994), a Sri Lankan academic
- George Alagiah (1955–2023), a British journalist and TV presenter

== See also ==
- Alagia, a similar name

.
