= Nina Siciliana =

Italian poet

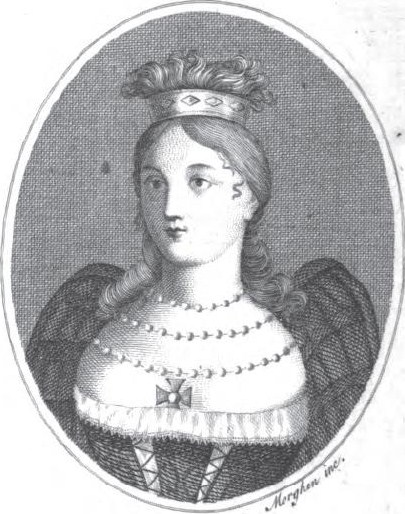
Nina Siciliana

(La) Nina Siciliana was the composer of one Italian sonnet, and a candidate to be the first Italian woman poet. She only came to light in 1780, along with 74 other poets, in the Étrennes du Parnasse (or Choix de Poësies). She is now considered legendary by most scholars.

Adolfo Borgognoni first proposed that Nina was a fictional construct of male poets in 1891 and was soon followed by Giulio Bertoni. Specifically Borgognoni thought she was invented by the successors of printer Filippo Giunti: essa [Nina] nacque in Firenze, nella officina degli Eredi di Filippo Giunti, l'anno del Signore 1527 ("this one [Nina] was born in Florence, in the office of the heirs of Filippo Giunti, the year of the Lord 1527"). The historicity of Nina—and tangentially the sex of the author of the poem traditionally assigned to her—has been debated ever since. Liborio Azzolina tried to resuscitate her and also Compiuta Donzella, whom Borgognoni, with less supporters, also ascribed to later male poets' imaginations. More recently the Italian scholar Lino Pertile has called her fantomatica (phantomlike) and Paolo Cherchi dismissed her as "mythical", to be followed by Anne Klinck.

Francesco Trucchi was the first to assign a poem to Nina: the sonnet Tapina in me, c'amava uno sparvero ("Alas for me, I loved a sparrowhawk"), probably composed in the late thirteenth or early fourteenth century. Nina was apparently inspired to write by the poems Dante da Maiano addressed "To his Lady Nina, of Sicily". Francesco de Sanctis, the foremost Italian literary critic of his day, praised la perfetta semplicità of Nina and Compiuta. One recent scholar who accepts Nina's existence and derides doubters has noted similarities between Nina and Alamanda de Castelnau.
