= Gherardo III da Camino =

Italian feudal lord and military leader

Gherardo III da Camino (c. 1240 – 1306) was an Italian feudal lord and military leader. He is generally considered the most outstanding member in the da Camino family.

== Biography ==
He was born in the family castle in Credazzo (or Padua), the second child of Biaquino II da Camino and India da Camposampiero. When his father died in 1274, he became the sole heir of the family's lands. He had already been member of the City Council of Treviso and, in 1266, had received the seignory of Feltre and Belluno from the local bishop, which Gherardo was to hold until his death.

A guelph exponent, in 1278 he signed an alliance with Padua, Cremona, Brescia, Parma, Modena and Ferrara against the Ghibelline Verona. In the 1280s, he decided to try to conquer Treviso, which was then in peace after the decline of the da Romano family. On November 15, after a city fight arranged by Gherardo, the Ghibellines (including the Castelli family) were expelled from Treviso; he was then elected capitano generale, with total power over the city's statutes. Gherardo's first move was to attack the Castelli's castles of Asolo, Cornuda and Monleopardo, and to destroy their city residence by treason.

Once in command of Treviso, Gherardo rewarded his supporters, in particular by giving back Camino and Oderzo to his relatives Tolberto III and Biaquino VI da Camino. When the cession was declared illegal by the commune, the latter called in the Republic of Venice by ceasing them Motta di Livenza (1291): this was the first mainland possession of the Serenissima.

Gherardo was a tyrannic but efficient administrator in Treviso, and increased its economic importance. He was also a patron of feasts and arts, housing in his courts numerous cultural figures, such as Dante Alighieri and Ferrarino da Ferrara. His daughter, Gaia, was a poet. His rule in Treviso was substantially peaceful, but he had to face an increasing number of plots, the last, in 1305, set up by his son Rizzardo, who had then a total control of Treviso due to Gherardo's declining health.

Gherardo da Camino died in 1306 and was buried at Treviso in the Franciscan church of St. Francis, which he had contributed to build.

== Sources ==
- Angella, Enrica; Bongi, Pietro (1993). Sulle terre dei da Camino. Pieve da Soligo: Bubola & Naibo.
