= Paolo Lanfranchi da Pistoia =

Italian composer

Paolo Lanfranchi da Pistoia (Occitan: Paulo Ianfranchi de Pistoia; fl. 1282–1295) was a noted Italian poet who wrote in both the Italian and Occitan languages. He is thus sometimes described as a troubadour. A native of Pistoia—he was a major cultural figure of the Duecento there—his sonnets have been praised for their originality.

== Biography ==
Paolo is first encountered in the records in Bologna in 1282. He was present for an act granted in favour of Pistoia on 1 February that year. He also testified alongside Forisio di Jacopo in a document of 13 October, and was still at Bologna on 21 January 1283, when he witnessed a mutuum contracted between two men of Pistoia, Gerardino Bruno and Pucino Pepi. In 1291 he was back in Pistoia, where he was sentenced as guilty for the crime of striking cum una spada malvagia vetita pro forma statutorum ("with a sword in malice") a certain Orellio Megliori on the head, ex dicta percussione multus sanguis extivit ("from which wound exited much blood"). He was sent into exile and was in Bologna again in 1295. It is therefore certain that if, as some historians have believed, Paolo spent some time at the court of Aragon in Spain, it must have been spent between 1283 and 1291, most probably 1283–1285 if at all.

== Italian poetry ==
Paolo wrote seven surviving sonnets in Italian. The first four are seen as an interrupted dream, while the last three are a contemplative response. The basic theme of Paolo's work is the question "How can man reconcile love of woman with love of God?" or, more generally, love of earthly with love of heavenly things. Paolo's solution tends towards complete division of Earth and Heaven, no reconciliation. As a lover, he ignores Reason and pursues his subconscious desires, but his "daydreaming" is interrupted the bells of Matins and thus he finds he cannot escape religious demands even in his mind. This tempts him to become a Patarine, that is, a heretic. Paolo finally ascribes his wretched condition to a war between God and Nature which occurred at his birth. His final two works employ the analogy of the wheel of fortune (rota fortunae) and may have been accompanied by visual aids in performance, much as has been suspected of jongleur performances elsewhere.

Paolo has usually been placed either within the school of Guittone d'Arezzo, the guittoniani, or in a transitional place between them and the Dolce Stil Novo. His style and language, however, are distinctly un-Guittonian. They have more in common with the Sicilian School, especially in their expression of raw emotion. Paolo's seven Italian sonnets are listed below by first line:

1. L'altr'er, dormendo, a mi se venne Amore
2. Dime, Amore, vorestù tornare
3. L'altr'er, pensando, mi emaçinay
4. Un nobel e çentil ymaçinare
5. Ogni meo fatto per contrario façço
6. De la rota son posti exempli asay
7. Quatro homi sum dipincti ne la rota

== Occitan poetry ==
Paolo's lone Occitan work is a sonnet of no artistic worth but some historical interest. It is confidently dated to 1284 and is conserved only in troubadour manuscript P, an Italian chansonnier of 1310, now XLI.42 in the Biblioteca Laurenziana in Florence. It begins Valenz Senher, rei dels Aragones and is addressed to Peter III of Aragon. Paolo probably left no other Occitan works, but his poem is historically interesting for its information on north Italian perspectives concerning the War of the Sicilian Vespers, the conflict between the Angevins and Aragonese for Sicily. Peter III and the Aragonese cause was popular in northern Italy at the time and Paolo's sonnet is a celebration of his victory over the Angevins and Capetians in the Aragonese Crusade:

Valenz Senher, rei dels Aragones
a qi prez es honors tut iorn enansa,
remembre vus, Senher, del Rei franzes
qe vus venc a vezer e laiset Fransa
Ab dos sos fillz es ab aqel d'Artes;
hanc no fes colp d'espaza ni de lansa
e mainz baros menet de lur paes:
jorn de lur vida said n'auran menbransa.
Nostre Senhier faccia a vus compagna
per qe en ren no vus qal[la] duptar;
tals quida hom qe perda qe gazaingna.
Seigner es de la terra e de la mar,
per qe lo Rei Engles e sel d'Espangna
ne varran mais, si.ls vorres aiudar.

Valiant Lord, king of the Aragonese
to whom honour grows every day closer,
remember, Lord, the French king
that has come to find you and has left France
With his two sons and that one of Artois;
but they have not dealt a blow with sword or lance
and many barons have left their country:
but a day will come when they will have some to remember.
Our Lord make yourself a company
in order that you might fear nothing;
that one who would appear to lose might win.
Lord of the land and the sea,
as whom the king of England and that of Spain
are not worth as much, if you wish to help them.

Several anonymous coblas that appear towards the end of MS P have been attributed to Paolo by nineteenth-century authors. One cobla, Mand qe iur e non periur was addressed al iuge de Galur, that is, the Judge of Gallura, then Nino Visconti. The cobla after it in the chansonnier is also addressed to Nino, but has not been assigned by any scholar to Paolo. The other anonymous cobla sometimes ascribed to Paolo was addressed to the "Count of Montfort". The anonymous author of both these coblas calls himself a jongleur.

== Sources ==
- Bertoni, Giulio (1915). I Trovatori d'Italia: Biografie, testi, tradizioni, note. Rome: Società Multigrafica Editrice Somu.
- Kleinhenz, Christopher. "The Interrupted Dream of Paolo Lanfranchi da Pistoia." Italica, 49:2 (Summer, 1972), pp. 187–201.
