= Allegory of Prudence =

Painting by Titian

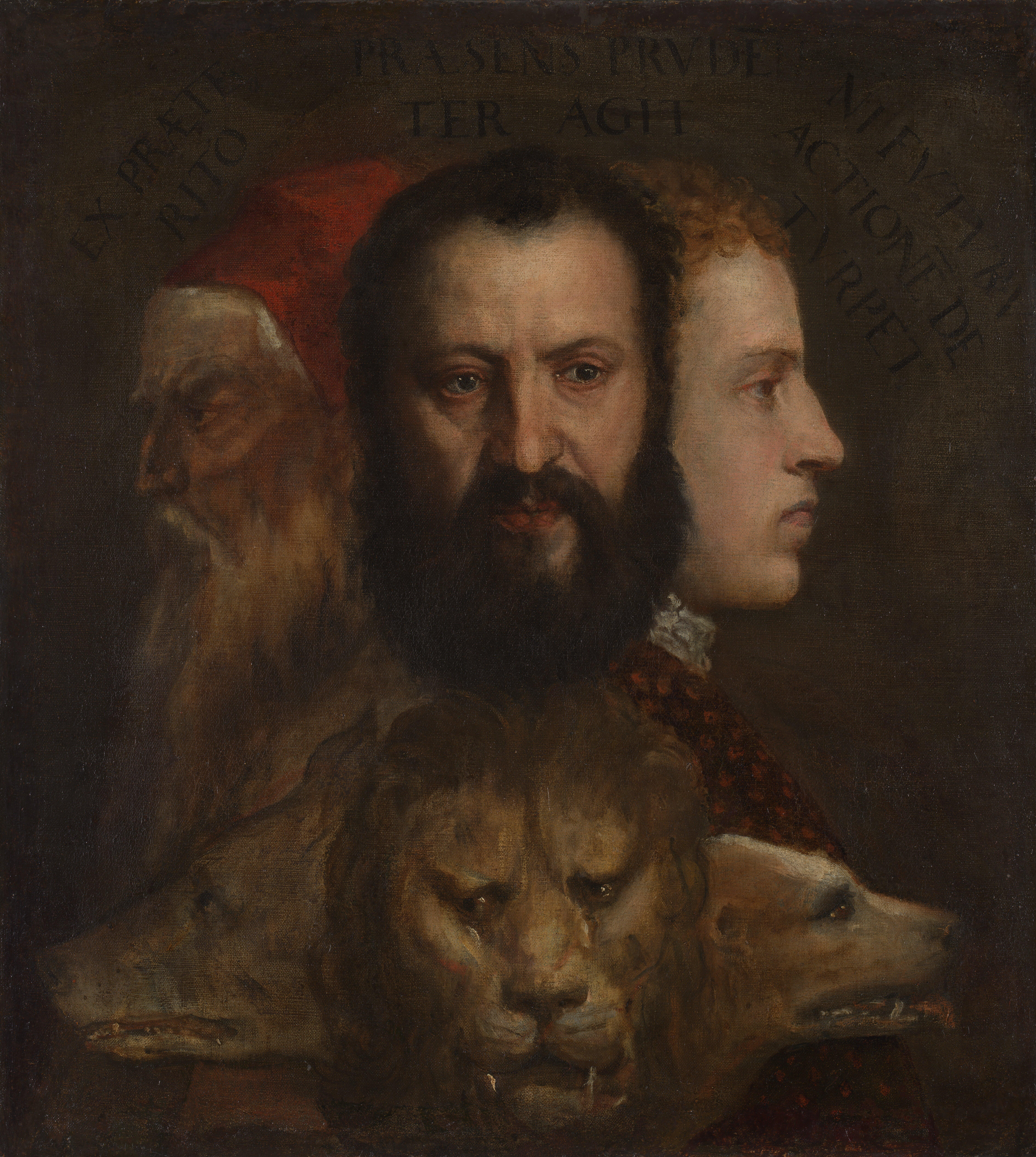
- Artist: Titian
- Year: 1550–1565
- Medium: Oil on canvas
- Dimensions: 76.2 cm × 68.6 cm (30.0 in × 27.0 in)
- Location: National Gallery; London

The Allegory of Prudence (c. 1550–1565) is an oil-on-canvas painting attributed to the Italian artist Titian and his assistants. The painting portrays three human heads, each facing in a different direction, above three animal heads (from left to right, a wolf, a lion and a dog). It is in the National Gallery, London.

The painting is usually interpreted as operating on a number of levels. At the first level, the different ages of the three human heads represent the three ages of man (from left to right: old age, maturity and youth), a subject that Titian had depicted 50 years earlier in his The Three Ages of Man. The different directions in which they are facing reflect a second, wider concept of time itself as having a past, present and future. This theme is repeated in the animal heads: an animal with three heads (wolf, lion, dog) to represent the passage of time (past, present, future) is associated with Serapis in Macrobius's Saturnalia, and associated with Apollo by Petrarch, and the iconography is repeated for example in the Hypnerotomachia Poliphili of Francesco Colonna (1499), the Hieroglyphica of Pierio Valeriano (1556), and the Iconologia of Cesare Ripa (1643). The third level, from which the painting has acquired its present name, is suggested by a barely visible inscription above the portraits: EX PRÆTE/RITO // PRÆSENS PRVDEN/TER AGIT // NI FVTVRA / ACTIONĒ DE/TVRPET (Latin for "from the experience of the past, the present acts prudently, lest it spoil future actions".)

It has been argued that the human faces are actual portraits of the aged Titian, his son Orazio, and his young nephew, Marco Vecellio, who, like Orazio, lived and worked with Titian. Erwin Panofsky, in his classic exposition, suggests that the painting is specifically related to the negotiations associated with the passing on of Titian's property to the younger generations, in the light of his approaching death. The painting therefore acts as a visual counsel to the three generations to act prudently in the administration of the inheritance. Nicholas Penny is, however, highly sceptical of this, and points out discrepancies between the human heads and other evidence of the individuals' appearance. He doubts it was a personal project of any sort and feels that is "surely more likely that the painting was commissioned". Others are also of the opinion that the three heads are not Titian and his family. One reason is that there are no portraits of Orazio or Marco, so confirmation that they are the figures is difficult.

More recently the painting has been explained in quite different ways. Instead of an allegory of prudence, it has been seen as an allegory about sin and penitence. On this view, it amounts to an admission by Titian that his failure to act prudently in his youth and middle age has condemned him to lead a regretful old age.

At the other extreme, the painting has been explained as asserting that the prudence which comes with experience and old age is an essential aspect of artistic discrimination and judgement. On this interpretation, the painting therefore acts as a rebuttal of the view that old age is the enemy of artistic achievement. On a more general level, the painting's depiction of Titian with his assistants Orazio and Marco is also intended as a defence of the prudence of the continuity of the Venetian workshop tradition.

The painting was presented to the National Gallery in 1966 by the art dealer David Koetser and his wife Betty.

== See also ==
- List of works by Titian
