= Marco Vecellio =

Italian painter (1545–1611)

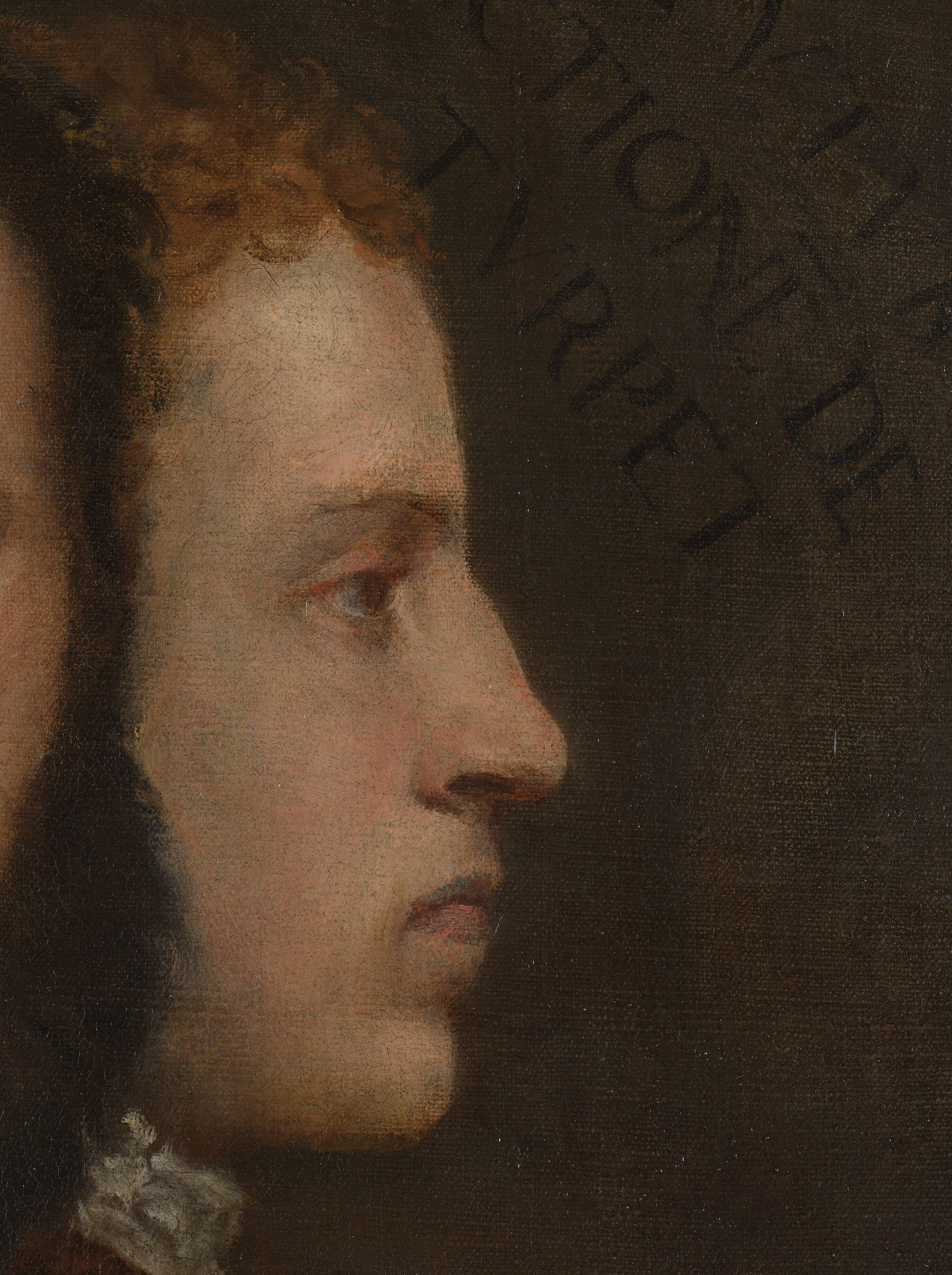
- Detail from Titian's Allegory of Prudence, c. 1550, claimed by Erwin Panofsky to depict Vecellio
- Born: 1545; Venice
- Died: 1611 (aged 65–66)

Marco Vecellio (1545–1611) was an Italian painter of the Renaissance period. He was also called Marco di Tiziano, since he was Titian's nephew. He was born and active mainly in Venice. He accompanied his distinguished uncle in the journeys to Rome and Germany. He was the favorite pupil of Titian, and approached nearer to his style than any other member of the family. There are several pictures by him in the Doge's palace, among the best an allegory in the ante-chamber to the Sala del Gran Consiglio. Another good example is a picture in the Sala della Bussola, Doge Leonardo Donato before the Virgin and Infant Christ. He also painted for churches at Venice, Treviso, and in the Friuli, among other things a Christ fulminating the world, and The Virgin on Earth Sending the Two Founders Dominic and Francis for the church of San Zaniopolo, at Venice.

He left some able productions in the ducal palace, the Meeting of Charles V. and Clement VII. in 1529; in S. Giacomo di Rialto, an Annunciation; in SS. Giovani e Paolo, Christ Fulminant. A son of Marco, named Tiziano (or Tizianello), painted early in the 17th century.

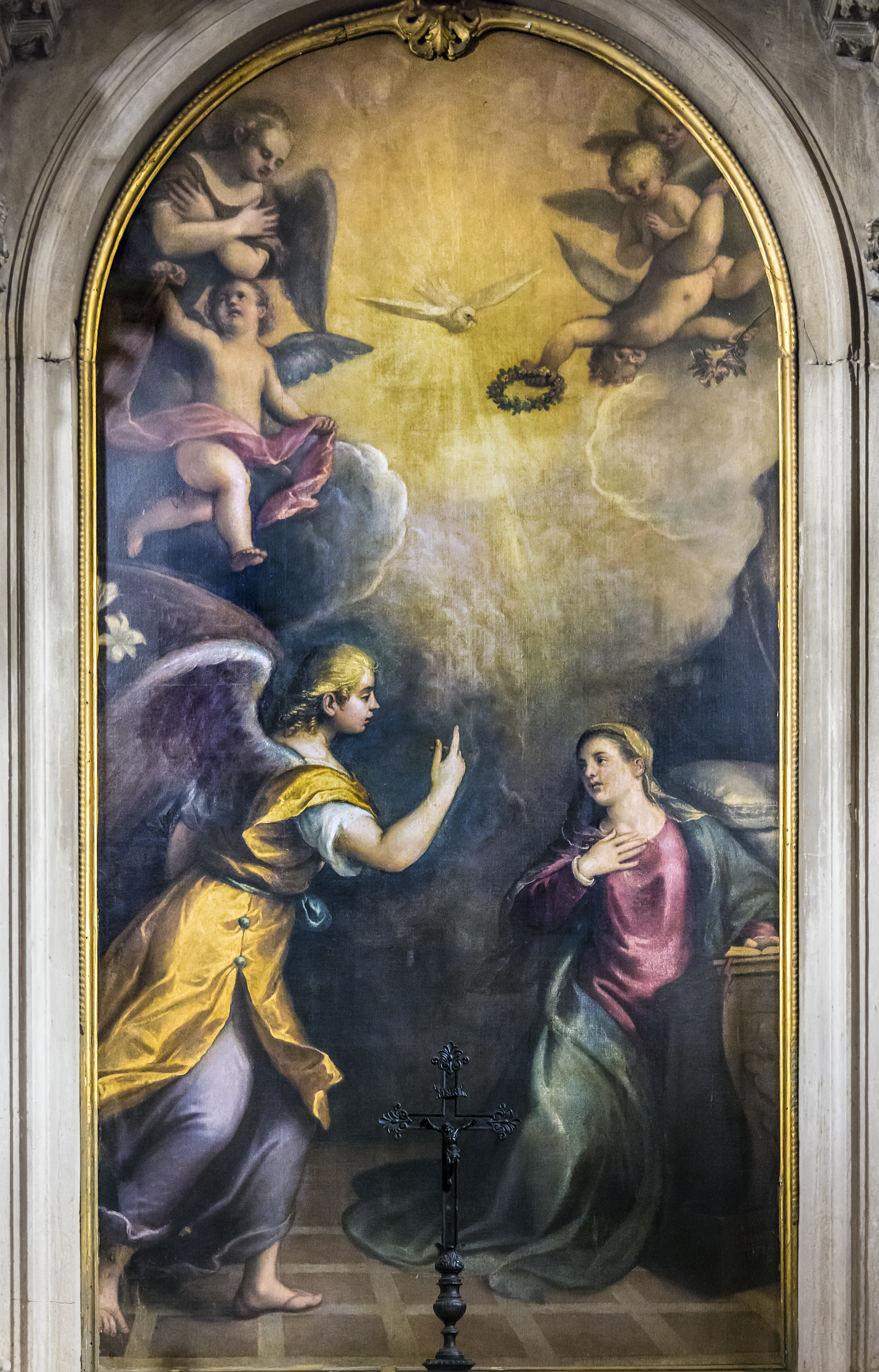
Annunciation, altarpiece in the church San Giacomo di Rialto (Venice)

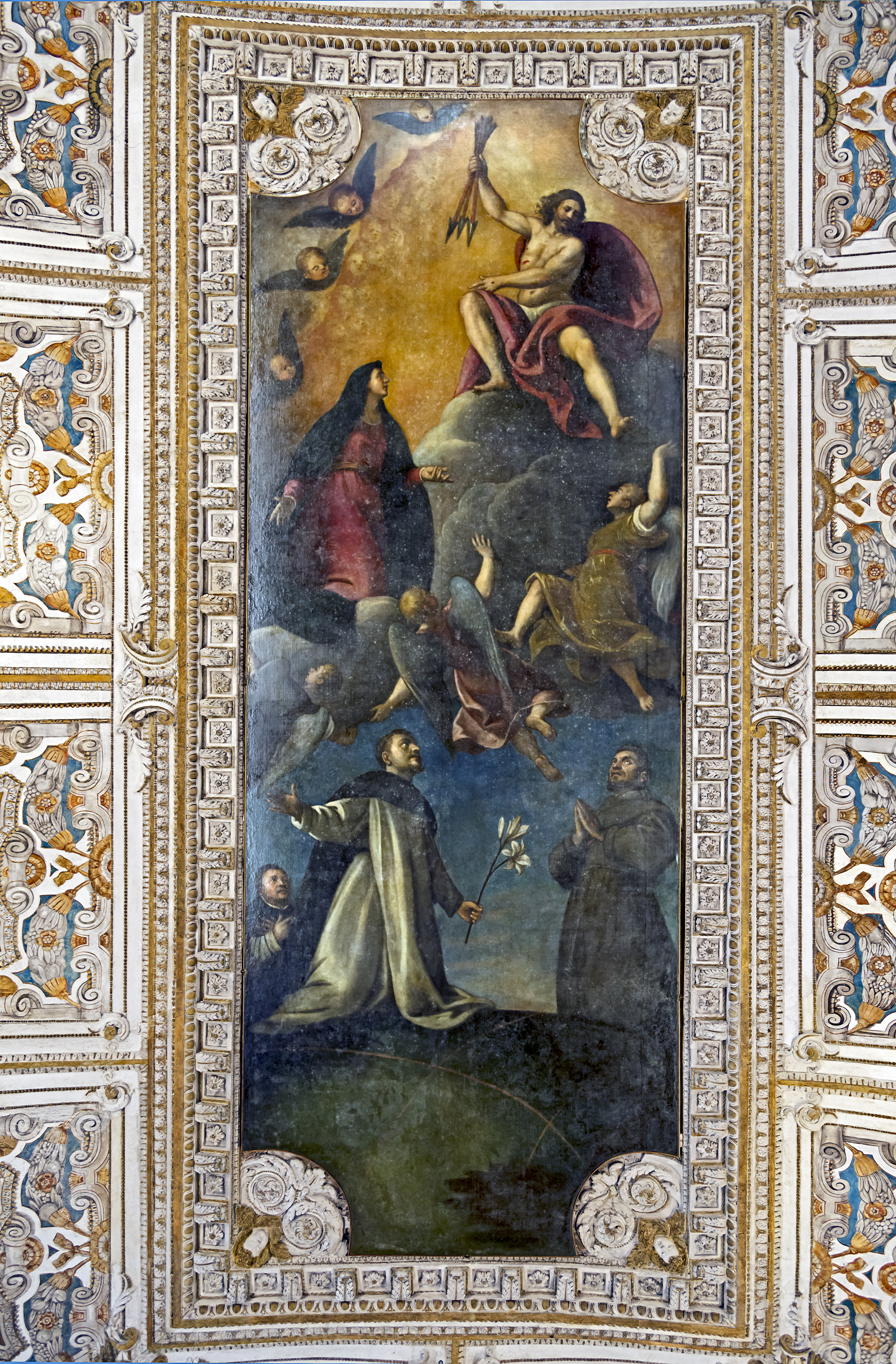
The Virgin on earth sending the two founders Dominic and Francis, interior of Santi Giovanni e Paolo, Venice
