= Orazio Vecellio =

Son of Titian (1528-1576)

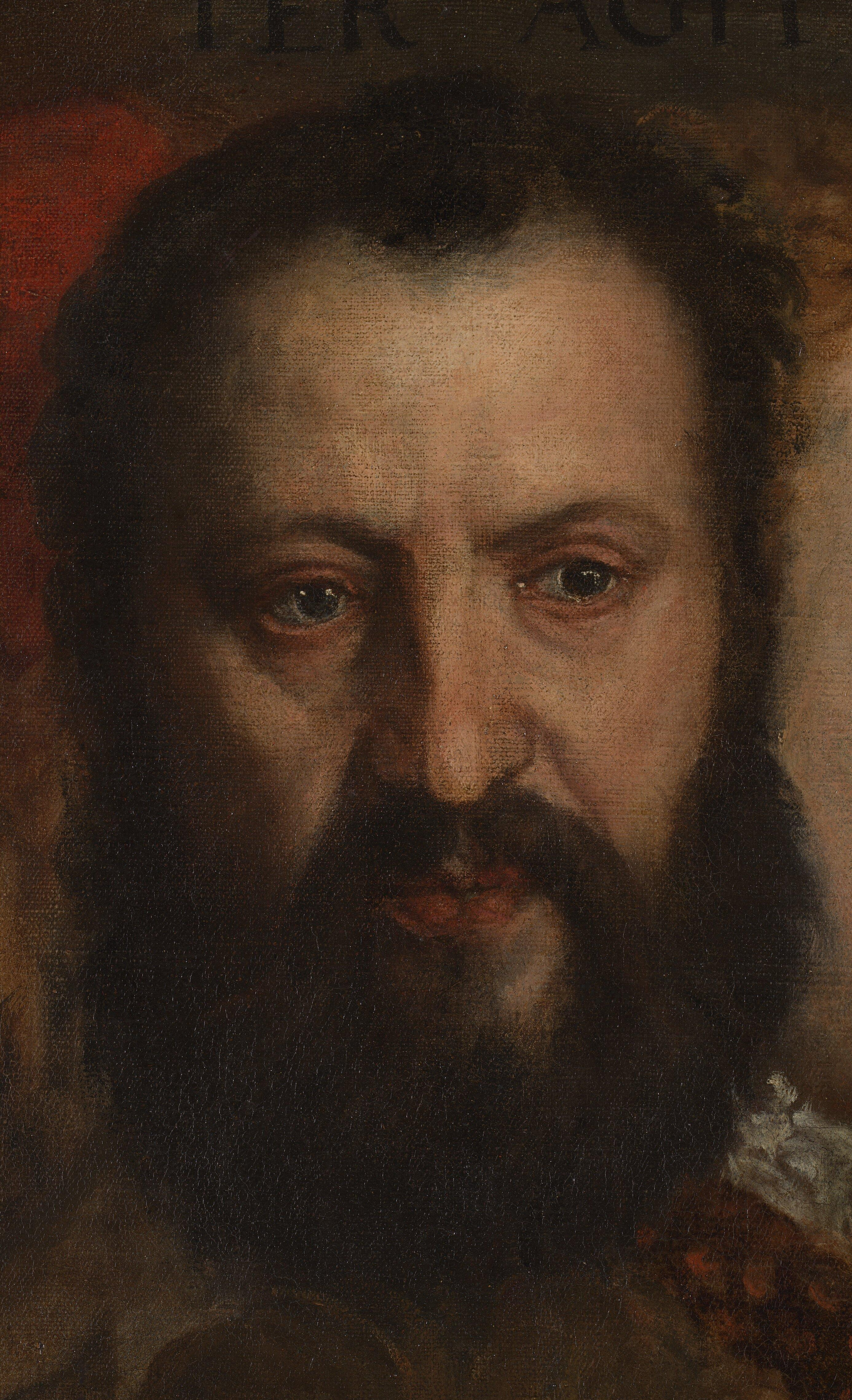
Orazio Vecellio depicted in the Allegory of Prudence, painted by his father in 1550

Orazio Vecellio (c. 1528–1576) was an Italian painter of the Renaissance period, born in Venice around 1528. The son and pupil of Titian, he distinguished himself as a painter of portraits, some of which were thought little inferior to those of his father. He occasionally painted historical subjects; one of the most important was destroyed in the 1577 conflagration in the Doge's Palace in Venice. He neglected painting to devote himself to alchemy. He died of the plague in Venice, in 1576, the same year as his father.
