= Camino, Veneto =

Camino
- Frazione
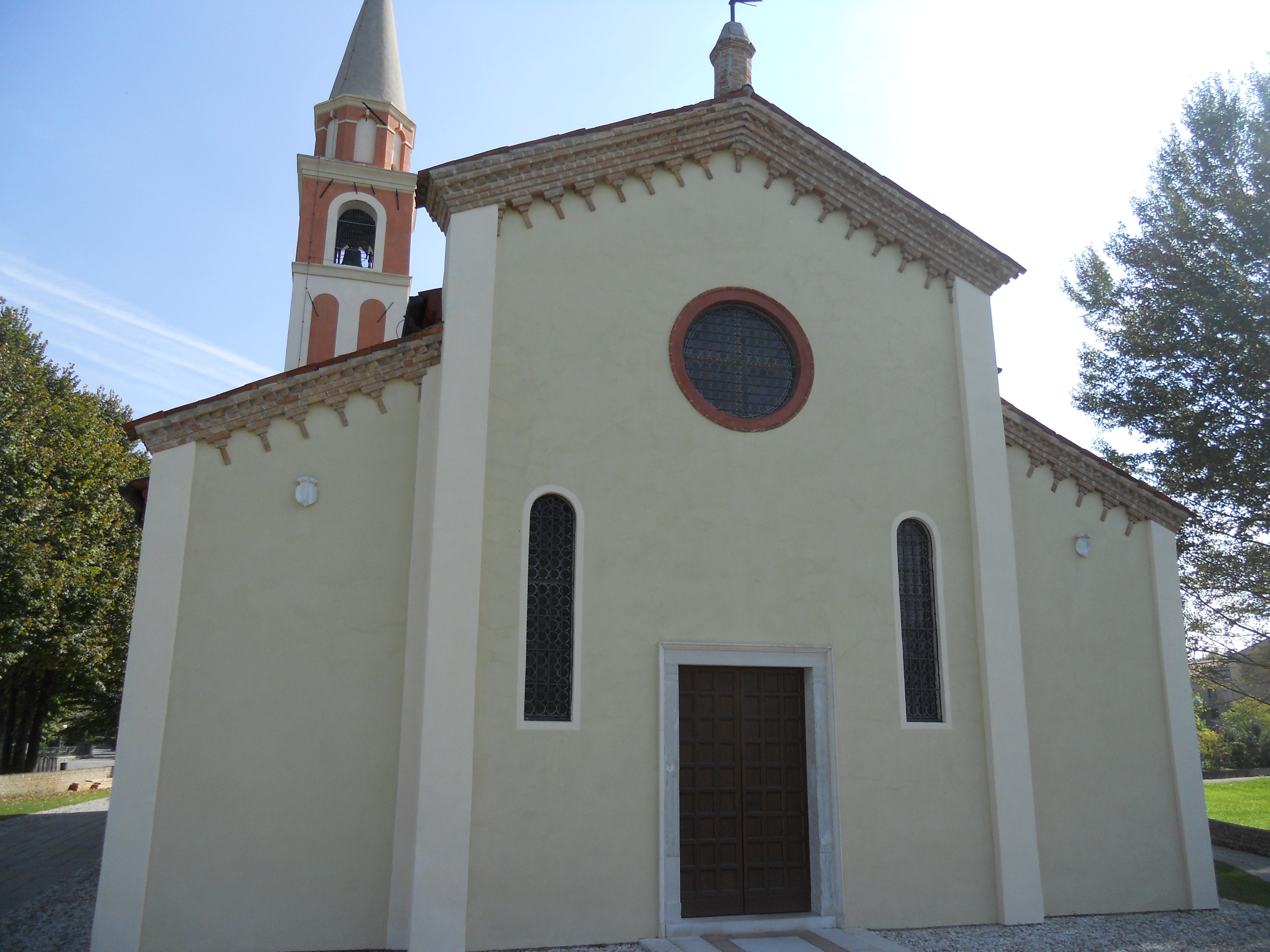
- Camino's parish church, dedicated to Saint Bartholomew the Apostle

- Location of Camino in Italy
- Coordinates: 45°47′50″N 12°29′28″E
- Country: Italy
- Region: Veneto
- Province: Treviso (TV)
- Comune: Oderzo

Area
  - Total: 12 km^{2} (4.6 sq mi)
- Elevation: 14 m (46 ft)

Population (1 June 2008)
  - Total: 2,300
  - Density: 190/km^{2} (500/sq mi)
- Demonym: Caminesi
- Time zone: UTC+1 (CET)
  - Summer (DST): UTC+2 (CEST)
- Postal code: 31046
- Dialing code: 0422
- Patron saint: Saint Bartholomew the Apostle
- Saint day: 24 August
- Website: Official website

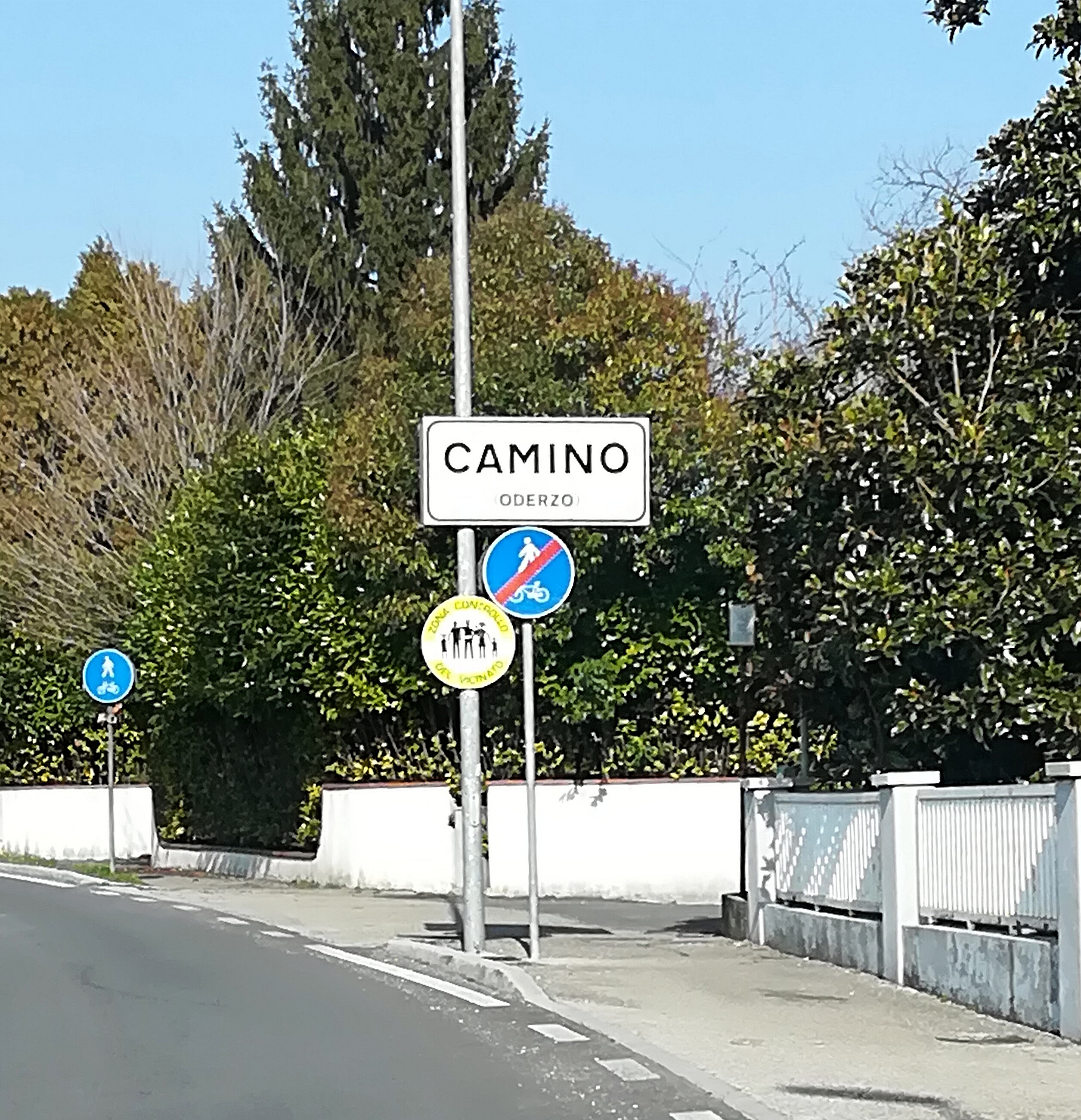

Camino is a village in the municipality of Oderzo, in the province of Treviso, region Veneto, in Italy. Camino lies in the heart of the Venetian plain, about 66 kilometres (41 miles) to the northeast of Venice.

== History ==
=== Venetic period ===
The earliest settlement of the area can be dated to the Iron Age, around the 10th century BC. From the mid-9th century BC the Veneti occupied site and gave it its name. Etymologically, "-terg-" in Opitergium stems from a Venetic root word indicating a market (q.v. Tergeste, the old name of Trieste). The location of Oderzo on the Venetian plain made it ideal as a centre for trade.

=== 10th century AD ===
In the 10th century, a certain Guido Colalto became count of Montanara for having saved the life of the German king Conrad I. His sons Alberto and Guecello received further lands from bishop of Ceneda, in the plain between the Piave and Livenza, in particular in Camino, where they built a castle. From the name of the place, they took their future name and became the da Camino Family.

== Notable people ==
- Stefano Dall'Acqua – Italian footballer who plays for Reggiana.
