= Compiuta Donzella =

Earliest woman poet of the Italian language

(La) Compiuta Donzella, called either di Firenze or Fiorentina, may have been earliest woman poet of the Italian language, active in the second half of the 13th century. Three of her sonnets survive in a single manuscript, and one is half of a tenzone. Compiuta may be her given name, but more probably a senhal (code name). Her full name translates "the accomplished young lady from Florence". Her existence was once in doubt and she was considered a construct of the poets, but this view has been discarded.

In A la stagion che 'l mondo foglia e fiora ("In the season when the world sends forth leaves and flowers"), Compiuta complains of her father's choice of a husband for her, and describes her distaste for an arranged marriage. She is miserable at springtime, when other lovers are rejoicing. In Lasciar voria lo mondo e Dio servire ("I would like to leave the world to serve God"), she bemoans the state of the world: lack of nobility, meanness of spirit, and dishonesty. She desires to enter a convent, but her father will not let her. In her only tenzone, Ornato di gran pregio e di valenza, with an admiring man who wishes to meet her, she responds with pleasant interest. The famous Italian poet Guittone d'Arezzo, who mentions her by name in his fifth letter, may have addressed it to her.

Compiuta's vocabulary was influenced by her knowledge of Occitan literature and the work of the troubadours. Thus, she contrasts cortesia (courtliness) with villania (villainy), terms borrowed from the setting of aristocratic court. Fin pregio (courtly virtue) and fin'amanti (courtly lovers) are in the courtly love tradition. Compiuta may have had access to the poems of the trobairitz. Her place as a very early vernacular poet was not ignored by contemporaries. Mastro Torrigiano wrote two sonnets about her: one wondering whether she was unnatural (for her sex) or miraculous ("a divine sibyl"), a second praising her for surpassing the norms of her sex.
