= Galeazzo I Visconti =

Lord of Milan from 1322 to 1327

- Lord of Milan
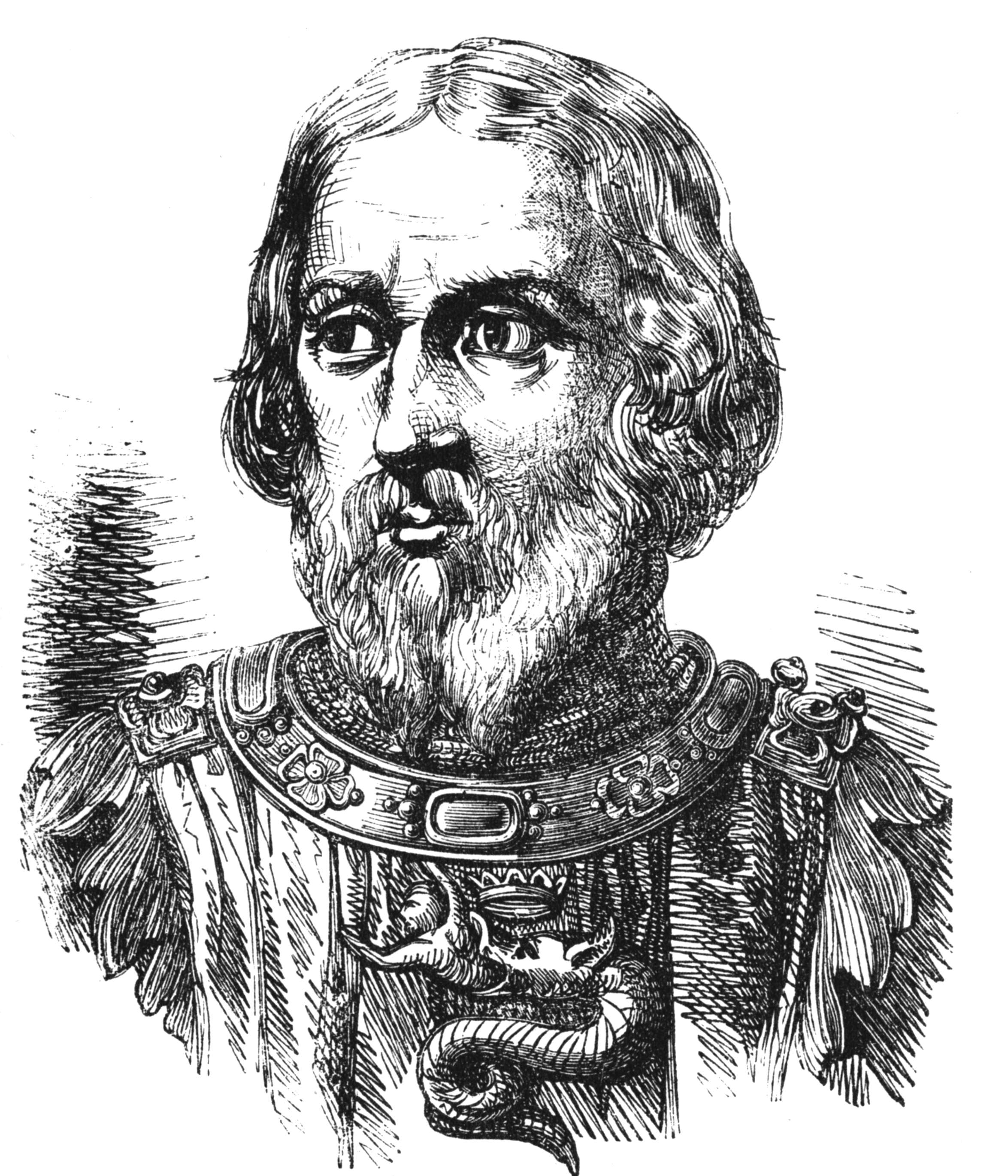

- Coat of arms
- Reign: 1322–1327
- Predecessor: Matteo I Visconti
- Successor: Luchino
- Born: 21 January 1277
- Died: 6 August 1328 (aged 51); Pescia
- Noble family: Visconti
- Spouse: Beatrice d'Este
- Issue: Azzone, Lord of Milan; Ricciarda, Marchioness of Saluzzo
- Father: Matteo I Visconti
- Mother: Bonacossa Borri

Galeazzo I Visconti (21 January 1277 – 6 August 1328) was lord of Milan from 1322 to 1327. After being chosen Captain of Milan, he defeated two papal armies and was excommunicated by Pope John XXII. Temporarily imprisoned for murder, Galeazzo retired to Pescia and died in August 1328.

== Biography ==
Galeazzo was the son of Matteo I Visconti and Bonacosa Borri. On 24 June 1300, he married Beatrice d'Este, daughter of Obizzo II d'Este. The following year the Visconti were, however, forced to leave Milan, and he lived at the Este and Bonacolsi courts for several years.

In 1322 Galeazzo was named capitano del popolo in Milan, and defeated a Papal-Angevin army at Bassignana. He was excommunicated by Pope John XXII in March 1323, and unrest in Milan impaired his authority. With the support of Emperor Louis IV, at Monza Galeazzo defeated an army sent against him by John XXII. In 1328, after accusations of betrayal from his brother Marco, as well as that of the assassination of his brother Stefano Visconti, the emperor had him imprisoned in Monza. Galeazzo was freed in March 1328 and took shelter under the other Ghibelline leader of Italy at the time, Castruccio Castracani. However, he died at Pescia in August 1328.

His son Azzone succeeded him in Milan. His daughter Ricciarda was married to Tommaso II di Saluzzo.

== Sources ==
- Black, Jane (2009). Absolutism in Renaissance Milan: Plenitude of Power Under the Visconti and the Sforza 1329-1535. Oxford University Press.
- Gentile, Luisa Clotilde (2004). Araldica saluzzese il medioevo (in Italian). Società per gli studi storici archeologici ed artistici della provincia di Cuneo. ISBN 9788866250036.
- Newman, Barbara (2005). "The Heretic Saint: Guglielma of Bohemia, Milan, and Brunate". Church History. 74 (1 Mar.). Cambridge University Press.
- Parker, Deborah (1993). "Ideology and Cultural Practice: The Case of Dante's Treatment of Beatrice d'Este". Dante Studies, with the Annual Report of the Dante Society (111). The Johns Hopkins University Press.

Italian nobility
Preceded by Matteo I Visconti	Lord of Milan; 1322–1327	Succeeded by Azzone Visconti
