= Rizzardo IV da Camino =

Italian nobleman and military leader

Rizzardo IV da Camino (1274 – April 12, 1312) was an Italian nobleman and military leader, a member of the da Camino family and lord of Treviso.

He was the son of Gherardo III da Camino, first lord of Treviso from the family, and Alice da Vivaro. In 1295 he was created knight in Rovigo by marquis Azzo VIII d'Este and was married to Catherine of Ortenburg, a family with whom his father wanted to create commercial ties. In the 1280s he was frequently sent by his father in diplomatic missions to Friuli and, in 1301, Rizzardo shared with his father the lordship of Treviso, succeeding him after his death in 1306.

In 1307 Rizzardo re-married to Joanna of Gallura. Two years later, he forced the Patriarch of Aquileia to flee to Venice and then obtained from him the title of capitano generale of Friuli. However a revolt in Udine had Rizzardo to flee in turn. Seeing his eastwards expansion had failed, he sided with the Ghibelline party, gaining from emperor Henry VII the title of Imperial Vicar. However, this deprived him of the support of the Venetian doge and of the traditionally Guelph Trevisan nobility.

Rizzardo was also missing the administrative capabilities and the charisma of his father. On April 5, 1312, while playing chess, Rizzardo was fatally wounded in the loggia of his palace. Dante Alighieri accused the city's nobles of the feat. Other sources call in the Paduan nobility, the Veronese leader Cangrande I della Scala or even his brother and successor, Guecellone VII da Camino.

== Sources ==
- Angella, Enrica; Pietro Bongi (1993). Sulle terre dei da Camino. Pieve da Soligo: Bubola & Naibo.
