= Da Camino =

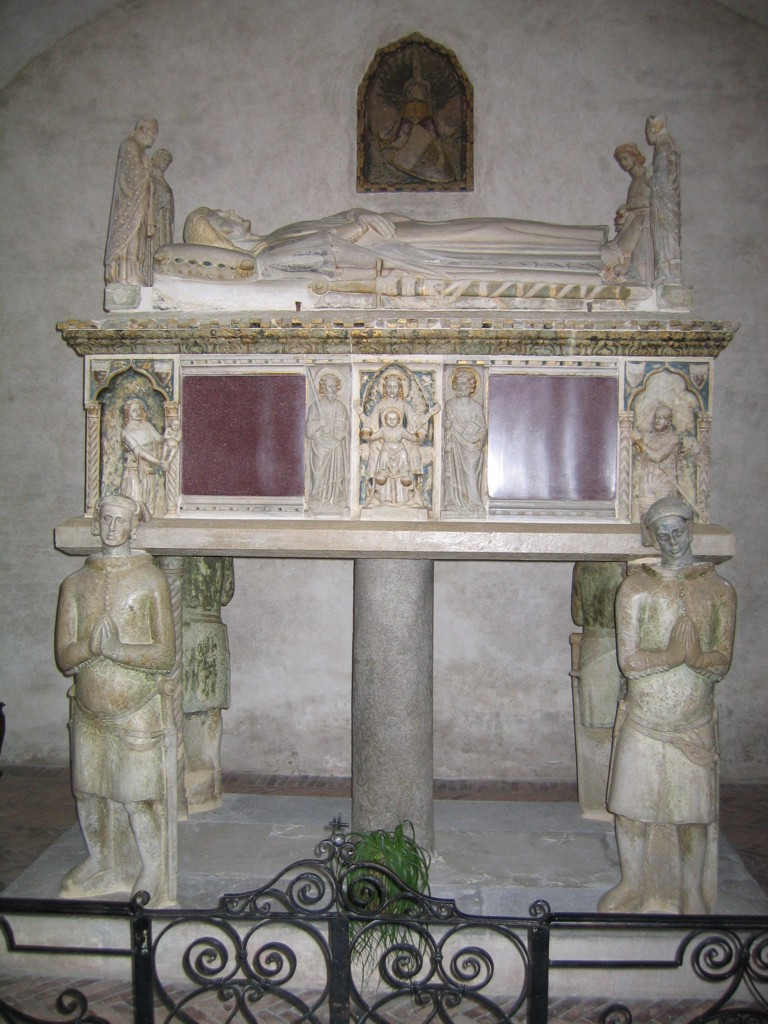
Funerary monument to Rizzardo VI da Camino in the church of Santa Giustina, Vittorio Veneto.

The da Camino (also known as Camino or Caminesi) were an Italian noble family whose fame is connected to the medieval history of the March of Treviso, a city of which they were lords for a while.

== History ==
Of Lombard origin, the da Camino descend most likely from the Colalto family, with one Guitcillo or Guicillo who is named in relationship with a castle in 958 at Montanara. His son Guido (Guidone) inherited this castle, placed along the road connecting Veneto to Friuli, in reward for having saved the life of the German king Conrad I. Guido was also created count of Montanara. His sons Alberto and Guecello received by the bishop of Ceneda further lands in the plain between the Piave and Livenza, in particular near Oderzo, where they built a castle. From the name of the place, now Camino frazione of Oderzo, they took their future name.

Thanks to further acquisitions from bishops and emperors, within a century the Caminesi extended their power over the comitates of Ceneda, Feltre, Belluno as well as in the areas of Cadore and Comelico. At this time they acquired, amongst others, a castle in the village of Cison di Valmarino, now known as Castelbrando.

After a short period of decline in which the commune of Treviso was able to reduce them at the condition of simple citizens (1183–1199), they soon gained a great authority in the March of Treviso and became the leader of the Guelphs in the region. This made them the main enemies of the Ghibellines Da Romano. In 1235 and 1239 the da Camino managed to obtain the rule in Treviso, but the second time they were betrayed by Alberico da Romano, who expelled the Guelphs from the city. However, with Gherardo III da Camino the Guelphs regained prominence. Gherardo was made seignor of the city in 1283.

He tried to expand his power in Friuli against the Patriarchate of Aquileia, but with poor results. He was more notable as a builder and administrator, as well as patron of the arts (Dante Alighieri being among his guests). His son Rizzardo peacefully inherited his charge. However, after a short period of occupation of Udine (1309), the subsequent defeat and the shift to the Ghibelline party caused the quick collapse of the family's fortunes. His son Guecellone was soon ousted from Treviso, ending forever the da Camino's rule there, while within twenty years (1335) their lands were all acquired by the Republic of Venice.

A lesser branch continued to have a role in the Venetian nobility until 1422, when they also lost all the lands in the Veneto. After a period of residence in Germany, the da Camino established themselves in Cordignano (c. 1604) and, from the late 18th century, in Trieste and Turin.

Some descendants currently live in Brazil and Peru.

The da Camino family still have descendants in the Cadore region of Northern Italy. The Vecellio family of Cadore are descended from the da Camino family through their common ancestor/founder Vecile da Camino who was a direct descendant of Guecello da Camino who lived in the 11th century. The Vecellio family produced the famous Renaissance artist Titian (Tiziano Vecellio).
