= Camillo III Gonzaga, Count of Novellara =

Camillo III Gonzaga
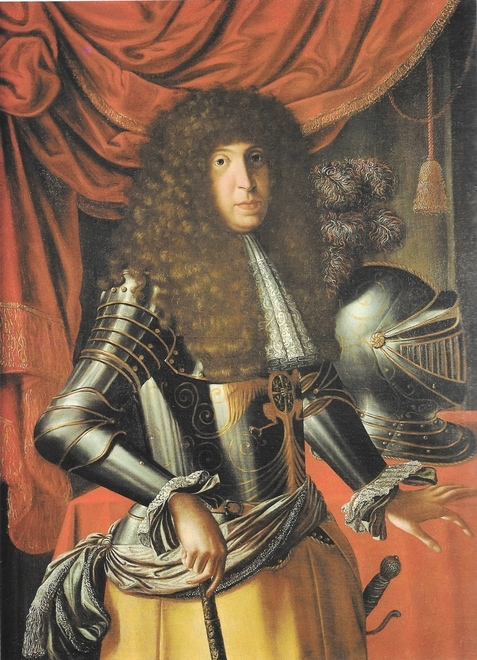
- Portrait by Benedetto Gennari II

Count of Novellara and Bagnolo
- Reign: 25 July 1678 – 16 August 1727
- Predecessor: Alfonso II
- Successor: Filippo Alfonso
- Born: 23 August 1649; Novellara, County of Novellara
- Died: August 16, 1727 (aged 77); Novellara, County of Novellara
- Burial: Church of the Jesuits, Novellara
- Spouse: Matilde d'Este (m. 1695)
- Issue: Filippo Alfonso; Ricciarda, Duchess of Massa; Alfonso (illegitimate)
- House: Gonzaga-Novellara
- Father: Alfonso II Gonzaga
- Mother: Ricciarda Cybo-Malaspina
- Religion: Catholicism

Camillo III Gonzaga (23 August 1649 – 16 August 1727) was a member of the House of Novellara, a cadet branch of the House of Gonzaga, and the Count of Novellara and Bagnolo from 1678 to his death.

== Early life ==
Camillo was born in Novellara on 23 August 1649. He was the son of Alfonso II Gonzaga, Count of Novellara, and his consort, Ricciarda Cybo Malaspina, daughter of Carlo I Cybo-Malaspina, Duke of Massa and Carrara.

Although he didn't excel at traditional education, he was considered talented and witty.

== Reign ==
Upon his father's death on 25 July 1678, he succeeded him as Count of Novellara. While being considered an avid hunter, Camillo distinguished himself for his ability in the administration of his small state, maintaining the court at his own expense. He supported his poorest subjects, including through tax breaks, founded monasteries and built churches. In April 1700, he was received in Rome by Pope Innocent XII, who granted him a blessing to the fifth generation and three hundred indulgences to distribute at his discretion.

In 1702 , after the battle of Santa Vittoria , Camillo hosted King Philip V of Spain, in his territory. During his residence in Novellara, the Spanish sovereign acted as godfather to the count’s first son, named Filippo Alfonso in his honour; on this occasion Camillo and his son were named Grandees of Spain of the first class.

Despite the warm welcome he gave King Philip V, Camillo III always refused to openly join the Bourbon party during the War of the Spanish Succession. His county was an imperial fiefdom, and he needed to avoid antagonizing the Habsburgs, holders of the imperial crown. His pragmatic policy of diplomatic balancing prevented his county from suffering the same fate as the neighbouring Duchy of Mantua, the principal Gonzaga state. There, in 1707, Duke Ferdinando Carlo Gonzaga, who had sided with the Franco-Hispanic forces, was arraigned by the emperor for felony, and the following year the fiefdom was confiscated and annexed to the Habsburg monarchy.

== Marriage and issue ==
On 22 August 1695, Camillo III Gonzaga married Matilda d'Este (San Martino line), daughter of Sigismondo III d'Este, Marquis of San Martino and Lanzo, and Maria Teresa Grimaldi, member of the reigning house of the Principality of Monaco. Three children were born of this marriage, two of whom survived to adulthood:

- Ricciarda (24 March 1697 – 26 April 1698), died in infancy;
- Ricciarda (22 August 1698 – 24 November 1768), on 29 April 1715, married Alderano I Cibo Malaspina, Duke of Massa and Prince of Carrara; from 1731 to 1744 she was regent there for the minor heiress; from 1728 she ruled the County of Novellara, first as imperial administrator, then as usufructuary under the sovereignty of the Este Duke of Modena;
- Filippo Alfonso (13 April 1700 – 13 December 1728), from 1727 sovereign Count of Novellara, Bagnolo and Cortenuova under the name of Filippo Alfonso I, Signor of the Novellara Canal, Signor of Santa Maria, San Tommaso and San Giovanni, Venetian patrician, in 1728 he married Eleonora Tanara, but the marriage was not consummated due to the premature death of her husband from tuberculosis.

Besides his wife, Camillo III had mistresses, one of whom, Donna Orsola Manari, bore him a son, Alfonso (1678–6 May 1750), whom he legitimized.

== Failed assassination attempt ==
On the night between 8 and 9 June 1714, Camillo III was the target of an assassination attempt: his carriage was riddled with arquebus bullets, but the count and his companions escaped unharmed, except for a coachman who was slightly injured. The perpetrators of the attack were all discovered and executed. The Count’s wife was suspected of having commissioned the attack, but no legal action was taken against her, and the matter was hushed up to avoid scandal. The Countess was nevertheless permanently banished from Novellara, leaving her children behind, and sent back to her father at San Martino to be confined in a convent. According to Canon Vincenzo Davolio, a later Novellara memoirist, the Countess was driven by a thirst for power and blind jealousy over her husband's affair with Orsola Manari. Not until 1725 was she allowed to return and attend the christening of her granddaughter Maria Teresa Cybo Malaspina, Ricciarda's long-awaited first child, and rumour had it that she later attempted to assassinate her husband again, this time with poison. The Count maintained a harsh and disdainful attitude towards her until the end, and in his will he took care to prohibit, after his death, any association of his wife with the county government. The Countess has remained shrouded in a sinister aura as a mistress of evil: she was even credited with creating a special arsenic preparation known as 'acquetta di Novellara', "which shortened the days of quite a few youth from [the county]" and which was eventually used successfully against her own son, Filippo Alfonso—though he actually died of consumption.

== Death ==
Camillo III managed to retain control of the fief by demonstrating loyalty to the Holy Roman Emperor. In March 1727, the Count suffered an accident from which he never recovered. His death on August 16, 1727, caused deep grief among his subjects.

Camillo III's successor, Filippo Alfonso died childless over a year later of tuberculosis. The county then became a vacant fiefdom, and while waiting for its fate to be decided, Ricciarda assumed its administration. Both Camillo III and Alfonso had designated her as the heir to their estate, but Salic law prevented her from succeeding to sovereign feudal titles. Despite her attempts to have the Emperor invest her suo jure, in 1737 the fiefdom was finally bestowed upon the Este family of Modena, and almost simultaneously, Ricciarda signed the betrothal of her daughter Maria Teresa to their heir, Ercole Rinaldo. The agreements contained the clause that Ricciarda would maintain full government of her ancestral county for life, "so that the [Duke of Modena] would retain but his sovereign rights, of which he may not divest himself." She was the last scion of the Gonzaga-Novellara house, whose members had ruled the fiefdom since the late 14th century. After her own marriage, her daughter Maria Teresa became Countess consort of Novellara and Bagnolo, as well.
