= Filippo Alfonso Gonzaga =

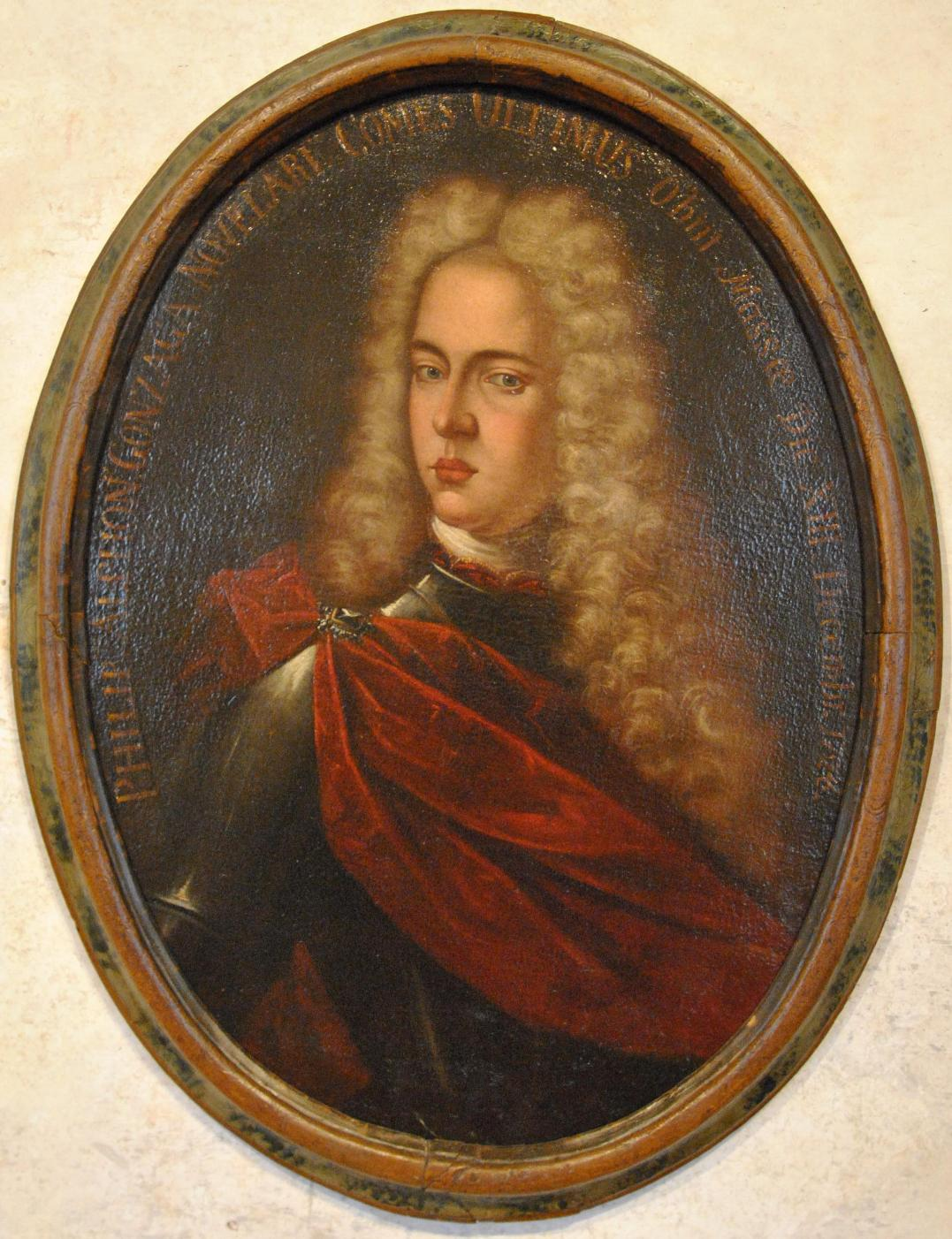

Count of Novellara and Bagnolo
- Coat of arms
- Reign: 16 August 1727 – 13 December 1728
- Tenure: 16 August 1727 – 13 December 172
- Predecessor: Camillo III Gonzaga
- Successor: Ricciarda Gonzaga (as regent)
- Born: 13 April 1700; Novellara, County of Novellara
- Died: 13 December 1728 (aged 28); Massa, Duchy of Massa and Carrara
- Noble family: Gonzaga
- Spouse: Eleonora Tanara
- Father: Camillo III Gonzaga
- Mother: Matilde d'Este

Filippo Alfonso Gonzaga (13 April 1700 – 13 December 1728) was an Italian nobleman who was Count of Novellara and Bagnolo from 16 August 1727 until his death.

== Biography ==
Filippo Alfonso was born on 13 April 1700 in Novellara. He was the third child of Camillo III Gonzaga and Matilda d'Este.

In 1702, after the battle of Santa Vittoria, Camillo III hosted the new King of Spain, Philip V, in his lands. During his stay in Novellara, the Spanish sovereign sponsored Filippo Alfonso at his baptism; on which occasion Camillo III and the child were named Grandees of Spain of the first class.

After having contracted tuberculosis at a young age, he succeeded his father in August 1727. Among the first measures he undertook were some public building and restoration work in Novellara and the reorganization of the county's small armed contingent.

Seriously ill, in August 1728, it was decided to transfer him to Massa, where his sister Ricciarda, wife of Duke Alderano I Cybo-Malaspina, lived.

He died on 13 December 1728.

With his death, the House of Gonzaga of Novellara and Bagnolo became extinct, since the marriage between the count and the marchioness Eleonora Tanara was never consummated.

The County was administered until 1737 by his sister Ricciarda, when, for services rendered during the War of the Polish Succession, it was assigned to Rinaldo d'Este, Duke of Modena and Reggio. Ricciarda retained the usufruct of the County for the duration of her life, by virtue of the marriage agreements concluded in 1738 for the union between her daughter Maria Teresa Cybo-Malaspina and Ercole Rinaldo d'Este, heir to the throne of Modena and Reggio.
