= Ricciarda Gonzaga =

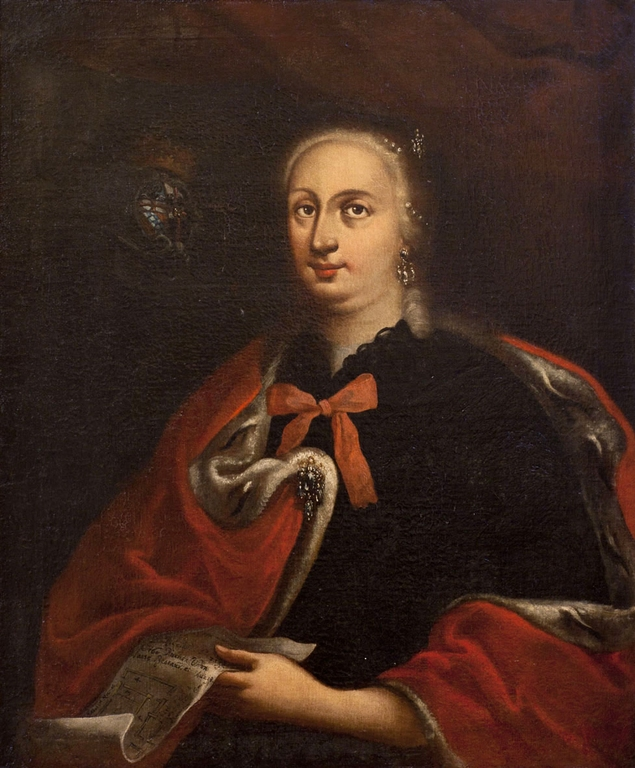

Duchess consort of Massa Princess consort of Carrara
- Predecessor: Nicoletta Clotilde Grillo
- Successor: Ercole Rinaldo d'Este (as consort and co-regent)
- Born: 22 August 1698; Novellara, County of Novellara and Bagnolo
- Died: 24 September 1768 (aged 70); Massa, Duchy of Massa and Carrara
- Burial: Massa Cathedral
- Spouse: Alderano I Cybo-Malaspina (m. 1715; died 1731)
- Issue Detail: Maria Teresa, Duchess of Massa; Princess Maria Anna Matilde; Princess Maria Camilla
- House: Gonzaga of Novellara and Bagnolo
- Father: Camillo III Gonzaga
- Mother: Matilde d'Este
- Religion: Catholicism

Ricciarda Gonzaga (22 August 1698 – 24 November 1768) was the elder surviving daughter of Camillo III Gonzaga and Matilda d'Este. She married Alderano I Cybo-Malaspina, becoming Duchess consort of Massa, and Princess consort of Carrara. Her granddaughter, Maria Beatrice d'Este, would start the co-founder of the House of Austria-Este.

She also had a younger brother, Filippo Alfonso Gonzaga, their father's heir apparent, who died of tuberculosis in Massa in December 1728, less than a year and a half after succeeding him to the county throne. Following his death Ricciarda ruled as the last (albeit not sovereign) Countess of Novellara and Bagnolo until her own death.

== Biography ==
Ricciarda Gonzaga was born on 22 August 1698, to Camillo III Gonzaga and his consort, Matilda d'Este. Her older sister, also named Ricciarda, had died in infancy in April 1698.

=== Marriage ===
On 29 April 1715 Ricciarda married in Milan her distant cousin, Alderano Cybo-Malaspina, the heir presumptive to his eldest brother Alberico III, Duke of Massa and Carrara. A few months after the celebration of the marriage, the reigning Duke died and, to succeed him, Aldemaro I had to come to terms with his older brother, Camillo, who was on his way to an ecclesiastical career and was the future Latin Patriarch of Constantinople and cardinal. In order to renounce his rights to the duchy, he obtained the right to keep for himself as an appanage all the feudal and allodial assets that the family owned in the Papal State and in the Kingdom of Naples.

Also due to the loss of such income, Alderano I encountered considerable difficulties in governing the duchy, whose distressed finances were not sufficient to support the court and the dissipated lifestyle of the monarch, while his marriage also seemed to be heading, like that of his predecessor, towards sterility.

After having sold all he could of the family's patrimony, from silverware to artillery, Alderano I finally believed he had found the solution to his problems by putting the sovereign duchy itself on the market. There was talk of a purchase by the Este family of Modena, or by Duke Giuseppe Lotario Conti, Pope Innocent XIII's brother, but in the end, in 1724, Alderano began secret negotiations with the Republic of Genoa in order to reach the definitive alienation of the duchy to the Genoese. When the agreement had practically been reached, however, Ricciarda, a capable and resolute woman, decided to intervene and leaked her husband's intrigue to the Emperor and the Grand Duke of Tuscany, who certainly did not look favourably upon a possible Genoese expansion, and the deal was ruined by the intervention of an imperial commissioner.

Practically at the same time, in 1725, the Duchess finally gave birth to her first daughter, Maria Teresa, who was followed, in the next three years, by two more daughters. In this period, mainly thanks to Ricciarda's intervention, the financial situation of the duchy improved somewhat.

The fact that the duke's offspring were exclusively female, while obviously unwelcome, did not constitute an insurmountable succession problem in Massa: Salic law did not apply in the duchy by virtue of the decree of 16 July 1529 with which emperor Charles V had granted the investiture of the marquisate of Massa and lordship of Carrara suo jure to Ricciarda Malaspina, ancestress of Alderano, and to her descendants, including females in the absence of males, a principle whose validity Alderano had in any case confirmed by the emperor shortly before dying, in Rome, on 18 September 1731. In his will, drawn up a few days before his death, he named Maria Teresa universal heir and entrusted the regency to his wife and his brother Camillo. Ricciarda took over the government with a firm hand: her regency was formally confirmed with an imperial diploma on 15 September 1732, wherewith she was officially invested with the guardianship of her daughters, and she then maintained it until June 1744, when Maria Theresa, having reached the age of majority, was formally invested with the duchy by the Holy Roman Emperor Charles VII.

=== Daughter's marriage ===
As a sovereign duchess of her small state, Maria Teresa was a desirable match, and it was Ricciarda's job to ensure a suitable marriage for her, according to the customs and standards of the time. To this end, she signed two successive marriage contracts for her daughter during the 1830s.

The first was connected with the project of establishing a second Savoy state in central Italy. To this end, the famous general and Prince Eugene of Savoy, a cadet of a collateral branch of his family, requested the hand of the very young duchess for his great-nephew Eugene Jean, Count of Soissons, the last male descendant of his family line, with the approval of the emperor Charles VI and the king of Sardinia Charles Emmanuel III, to whom he looked up to as the head of the extended Savoy family. The marriage documents were signed in Vienna, where the prince resided, on 2 May 1732 and, in the month of October, were ratified by personal signature of the regent and the engaged couple during a courtesy visit of the eighteen-year-old count to Massa: the marriage, however, could not take place due to the premature death of the young man, in Mannheim, on 23 November 1734.

The death of the Savoy pretender did not at all determine the weakening of the emperor's interest in the marriage of the Duchess of Massa, and, after the names of a couple of princes from the German area had also been put forward, in the end the choice for the candidacy fell on Ercole Rinaldo d'Este, the last scion of the dynasty ruling the Duchy of Modena and Reggio, who was, in truth, two years younger than Maria Theresa. For the Este family, the small Tuscan state would represent the longed-for outlet to the sea (after the loss of Ferrara a century and a half earlier).

For several years, however, Ricciarda remained adamant in refusing to consider further candidates, given her daughter's still tender age. This was despite the fact that the issue of succession to her ancestral county of Novellara and Bagnolo was still open, and Ricciarda depended exclusively on the benevolence of Vienna for its resolution in her favour. For, in 1728, her brother Filippo Alfonso Gonzaga had died, leaving no children and no other male heirs, and Ricciarda was called upon to administer, during the interregnum, the county: it had become a vacant fiefdom pending the imperial decisions on its fate, but, as a woman, she had no direct right to succeed.

When the little duchess turned twelve in 1737, the emperor on one hand bestowed the county upon Duke Rinaldo I d'Este, grandfather of his candidate for marriage, and on the other he returned to the charge with Ricciarda: her uncle, Marquis Carlo Filiberto II d'Este di San Martino, was again charged with returning to Massa to reopen the negotiations, also on behalf of the new duke of Modena Francesco III d'Este, father of the groom. This time Ricciarda agreed and the wedding documents were signed on 20 March 1738. The bride was awarded a dowry of one hundred thousand scudi, but the duke of Modena on the other hand committed himself, from his own pocket, to increase by twenty thousand scudi the dowries established in the will of Alderano I for the two younger sisters of Maria Teresa. Once the marriage had taken place, the duchess would associate her husband in the government of her states, while the duke of Modena would be committed to allow the separation, in favour of Ricciarda Gonzaga, of the allodial assets from the feudal rights of the county of Novellara and Bagnolo, and to leave her full government of it for life, "so that the transferor would have nothing left but the right of sovereignty, which he cannot divest himself of."

The marriage, however, had to be postponed until 1741 so that the young Este could at least reach the age of fourteen. The wedding was finally celebrated by proxy in Massa on 16 April, with Maria Teresa's aforementioned great-uncle, Carlo Filiberto d'Este, representing the groom, and it certainly proved to be anything but happy for the young duchess.

=== Death ===
From then on, Ricciarda divided her life between Novellara, Massa (which she continued to govern indirectly due to her daughter's frequent absence) and Reggio, the residence chosen by Maria Teresa after her de facto separation from her husband.

She died on 24 November 1768, at the age of 70, in Massa, and was buried in the Cybo-Malaspina crypt in the Massa cathedral.

== Issue ==
Ricciarda and Alderano had 3 daughters:

- Maria Teresa Cybo-Malaspina (29 June 1725 – 25 December 1790), buried in the temple of the Blessed Virgin of Ghiara in Reggio, succeeded her father as sovereign of the Duchy of Massa and Carrara in 1731, under the regency of her mother until 1744, and with her assistance also thereafter;
- Maria Anna Matilde (15 August 1726 – 8 October 1797), married in 1748 Orazio Albani, 2nd Prince of Soriano nel Cimino, patrician of Urbino and Genoese patrician;
- Maria Camilla (29 April 1728 – 2 August 1760) married in 1755 Restaino Gioacchino di Tocco Cantelmo Stuart, fifth prince of Montemiletto, fifth prince of Pettorano, titular prince of Achaea, tenth duke of Popoli, fourth duke of Sicignano and duke of Apice, Neapolitan patrician, Venetian patrician and grandee of Spain.
