= Matilde Aurelia Maria d'Este =

Matilde d'Este
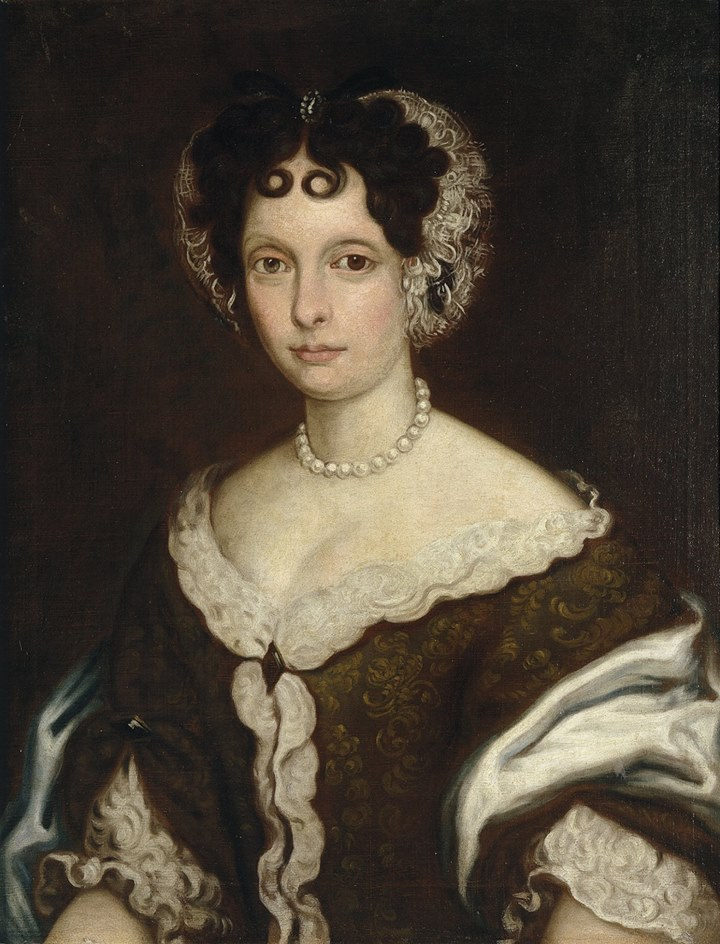

Countess of Novellara, Bagnolo and Cortenuova
- Tenure: 1695–1714
- Predecessor: Ricciarda Cybo Malaspina
- Successor: Eleonora Tanara
- Born: Matilde Aurelia Maria d'Este; December 2, 1674; San Martino in Rio
- Died: March 2, 1732 (aged 57); Novellara
- Spouse: Camillo III Gonzaga (m. 1695; died 1727)
- Issue: Ricciarda Gonzaga; Ricciarda Gonzaga; Filippo Alfonso Gonzaga
- House: Est of San Martino
- Father: Sigismondo III d'Este
- Mother: Maria Teresa Grimaldi
- Religion: Catholicism

Matilde Aurelia Maria d'Este (2 April 1673 – 2 March 1732), often simply called Matilde d'Este, was second child and first daughter of Sigismondo III d'Este and his wife Maria Teresa of Monaco.

Upon marrying Camillo III Gonzaga, she became Countess Consort of Novellara, Bagnolo and Cortenuova.

She has retained the grim reputation as being a notorious poisoner and as having twice attempted to assassinate her husband.

== Biography ==
Matilde Aurelia Maria d'Este was born on 2 April 1673, in Marquisate San Martino in Rio, which was ruled by a collateral branch of the House of Este. Her father, Sigismondo, was the Marquis. Her mother, Maria Teresa Grimaldi, was the daughter of Ercole, Marquis of Baux, the heir apparent of the Principality of Monaco.

=== Marriage and issue ===
On 22 August 1695, Matilde married Camillo III Gonzaga, becoming Countess Consort of Novellara, Bagnolo and Cortenuova. The couple had three children, two of whom survived into adulthood:

- Ricciarda (24 March 1697 – 26 April 1698), died in infancy.
- Ricciarda (22 August 1698 – 24 November 1768), married Alderano I Cybo-Malaspina, they had three daughters, one of whom was Maria Teresa Cybo-Malaspina.
- Filippo Alfonso (13 April 1700 – 13 December 1728), 9th sovereign Count of Novellara, Bagnolo and Cortenuova, under the name of Filippo Alfonso I Gonzaga, owner of the irrigation canal in Novellara, signor of Santa Maria, San Tommaso and San Giovanni, a Venetian patrician, in 1728 married Eleonora Tanara, but the marriage was not consummated due to the premature death of the Count.

=== A macabre reputation ===
Countess Matilde went down in history as a terrible jealous woman and the alleged creator of a powerful poison made from arsenic and called "acquetta di Novellara" (literally 'little/weak water of Novellara'), which she used to eliminate her enemies, and "which shortened the days of quite a few youth from Novellara". It was also rumoured that, by a sort of nemesis, the very same poison was eventually used successfully against her own son, Filippo Alfonso—though he actually died of consumption.

According to Canon Vincenzo Davolio, a later chronicler from Novellara, Countess Matilde was a very disreputable character, "supremely ambitious to govern, and at the same time jealous of the overly loose friendship that the Count cultivated with the widow Orsola Pio, née Manari". Indeed, it must have been a truly solid "friendship," given that the couple had produced a son long before, back in 1678.

On the night between 8 and 9 June 1714, Camillo III was the target of an assassination attempt: his carriage was riddled with arquebus bullets, but the count and his companions escaped unharmed, except for a coachman who was slightly injured. The perpetrators of the attack were all discovered and executed. Matilde was suspected of having commissioned the attack, but no legal action was taken against her, and the matter was hushed up to avoid scandal. The Countess was nevertheless permanently banished from Novellara, leaving her children behind, and sent back to her father at San Martino to be confined in a convent.

Not until 1725 was the Countess allowed to return and attend the christening of her granddaughter Maria Teresa Cybo Malaspina, Ricciarda's long-awaited first child, and rumour had it that she later attempted to assassinate her husband again, this time with poison. Be that as it may, the Count maintained a harsh and disdainful attitude towards her until the end, and in his will he took care to prohibit, after his death, any association of his wife with the county government.

=== Death ===
Matilde d'Este died in San Martino in Rio on 2 March 1732.
