= Louis I of Monaco =

Prince of Monaco from 1662 to 1701

Louis I
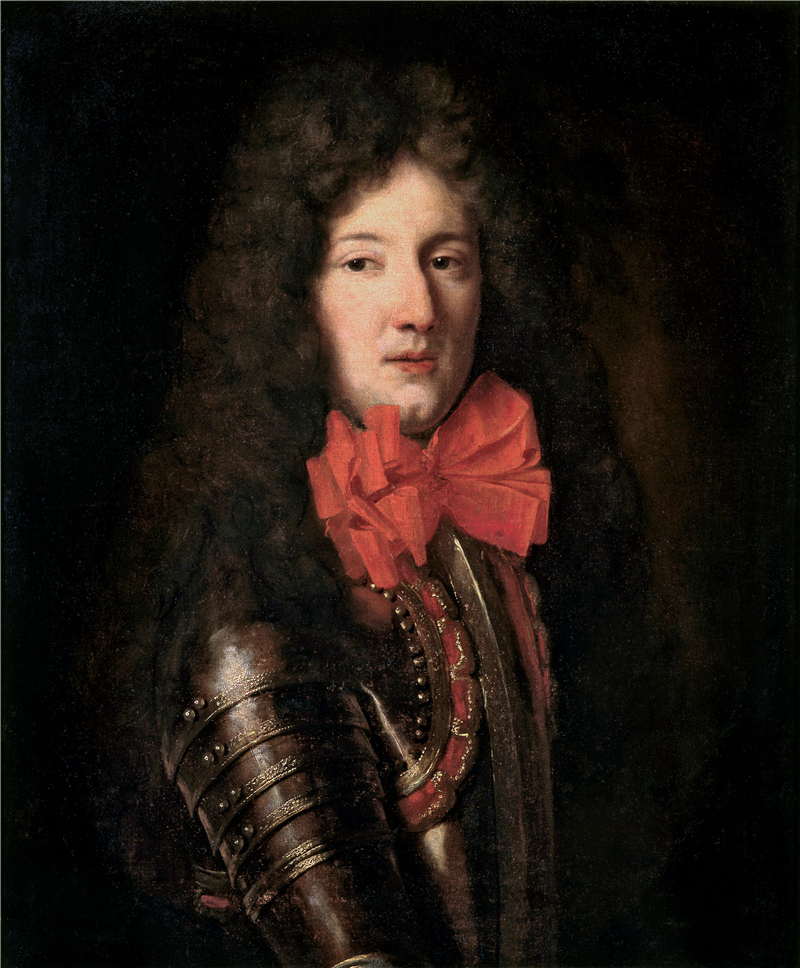
- Portrait by François de Troy

Prince of Monaco
- Reign: 10 January 1662 – 3 January 1701
- Predecessor: Honoré II
- Successor: Antonio I
- Born: 25 July 1642; Prince's Palace, Monaco
- Died: 3 January 1701 (aged 58); Rome, Papal States
- Burial: Cathedral of Our Lady Immaculate
- Spouse: Catherine Charlotte de Gramont
- Issue: Antonio I, Prince of Monaco; Maria Teresa Carlotta Grimaldi; Anna Hippolyte, Duchess of Uzès; François Honoré, Archbishop of Besançon; Giovanna Maria Grimaldi; Aurelia, Mademoiselle de Baux; Maria Victoria, Duchess of Mantua
- House: Grimaldi
- Father: Prince Hercule, Marquis of Baux
- Mother: Maria Aurelia Spinola

Louis I (25 July 1642 in Prince's Palace of Monaco – 3 January 1701 in Rome) was Prince of Monaco from 1662 until 1701.

== Early life ==
Louis Grimaldi was the elder son of Prince Hercule of Monaco and Genoese noblewoman, Maria Aurelia Spinola. His younger siblings were Maria Ippolita Grimaldi (wife of Carlo Emanuele Filiberto de Simiane, Prince of Montafia), Giovanna Maria Grimaldi (wife of Andrea Imperiali, Prince of Francavilla), and Teresa Maria Grimaldi (wife of Sigismondo III d'Este, Marquis of San Martino).

== Reign ==
In 1662, Louis succeeded his grandfather Honoré II as Prince of Monaco. In 1666 he distinguished himself at the Four Days' Battle between the English and Dutch fleets. On 5 July 1668 he took the oath to King Louis XIV of France in the Parlement on account of being Duke of Valentinois and a Peer of France. He was made a knight of the French royal orders on 31 December 1688.

In 1699, Louis XIV sent Louis to Rome as ambassador extraordinary. There on 19 December he presented the insignia of the Order of the Holy Spirit to James Louis and Alexander Benedict Sobieski, the two sons of King John III of Poland. Louis remained in Rome until his death there in 1701.

== Personal life ==
On 30 March 1660, Louis married Catherine Charlotte de Gramont, daughter of Marshal Antoine III de Gramont, in Pau. Together, they had six children:

- Antoine Grimaldi (1661–1731), his successor.
- Maria Teresa Carlotta Grimaldi (1662–1738), a Visitandine nun at Monaco.
- Anna Hippolyte Grimaldi (1667–1700), who married Jean Charles de Crussol, 7th Duke of Uzès, son of Emmanuel de Crussol, 5th Duke of Uzès, in 1696.
- François Honoré Grimaldi (1669–1748), Archbishop of Besançon
- Jeanne Maria Grimaldi, a Visitandine nun at Monaco, later coadjutrice of the Abbey of Royallieu near Compiègne.
- Aurelia Grimaldi, called mademoiselle de Baux.

Louis died in Rome on 3 January 1701. His remains were transported back to Monaco.

== Sources ==
- de Bernardy, Françoise (1960). Histoire des princes de Monaco: De Rainier Ier à Rainier III (in French). Librairie Plon.

Preceded by Honoré II	Sovereign Prince of Monaco; Duke of Valentinois; 1662–1701	Succeeded by Antonio I
