= Maria Teresa Cybo-Malaspina =

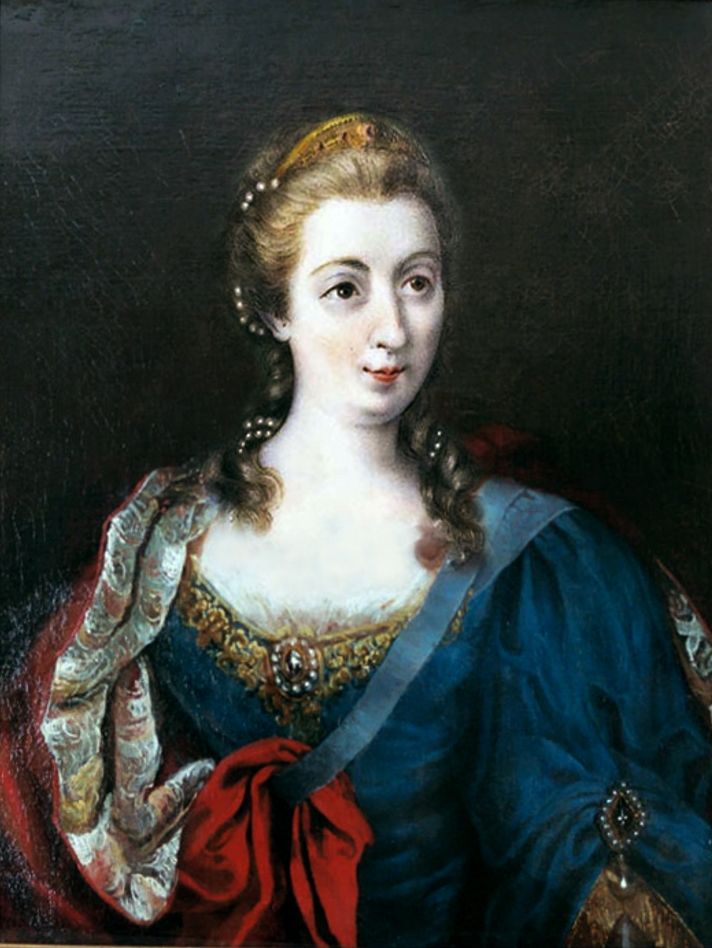

Duchess of Massa and Princess of Carrara
- Reign: 18 August 1731 – 29 December 1790
- Predecessor: Alderano I Cybo-Malaspina
- Successor: Maria Beatrice d'Este
- Born: 29 June 1725; Novellara, County of Novellara and Bagnolo
- Died: 29 December 1790 (aged 65); Reggio Emilia, Duchy of Modena and Reggio
- Spouse: Ercole III d'Este, Duke of Modena (1741)
- Issue Detail: Maria Beatrice d'Este, Duchess of Massa; Rinaldo Francesco d'Este
- House: Cybo-Malaspina
- Father: Alderano I Cybo-Malaspina
- Mother: Ricciarda Gonzaga di Novellara

Maria Teresa Cybo-Malaspina (29 June 1725 – 29 December 1790) was sovereign Duchess of Massa and Princess of Carrara from 1731 until her death in 1790. From 1780, she also formally held the title of Duchess consort of Modena and Reggio as the wife of Ercole III d'Este.

== Life ==
=== Childhood ===
Maria Teresa was born on 29 June 1725 in Novellara. She was the eldest daughter of Alderano I Cybo-Malaspina, duke of Massa and prince of Carrara, and his wife, Ricciarda Gonzaga di Novellara. As the ducal couple had no sons, and Salic law was derogated from in Massa and Carrara by virtue of a 1529 decree of Emperor Charles V, she was her father's heir presumptive. When he died on 18 August 1731, Maria Teresa succeeded him aged six, under the regency of her mother.

=== Marriage and adulthood ===
Her position as the sovereign of two states made Maria Teresa an attractive match. The Austrian military commander Prince Eugene of Savoy, who was from a cadet branch of the family, saw the possibility of a second Savoy state in central Italy. With the approval of Emperor Charles VI and the head of the House of Savoy, King Charles Emmanuel III of Sardinia, he proposed a marriage between Maria Teresa and the only male descendant of his family branch, his great-nephew Eugene Jean, Count of Soissons. The marriage contract was signed in Vienna on 2 May 1732, and in October the seventeen-year-old Count visited his seven-year-old bride. He died on 23 November 1734, and the wedding never took place.

The Emperor continued his interest in the marriage of the Duchess of Massa. Some German princes proposed themselves, but he chose Ercole Rinaldo d'Este, the last scion of his house, and two years younger than Maria Teresa. For the House of Este, which ruled the Duchy of Modena and Reggio, the two small Tuscan states meant regaining access to the sea. For the next few years, however, Maria Teresa's mother refused to consider further candidates due to her daughter's young age, despite her dependence on imperial favour. She hoped to officially inherit her family's County of Novellara and Bagnolo, an imperial fief left vacant upon the childless death of her brother Filippo Alfonso Gonzaga and temporarily entrusted to her administration. In 1737, however, it was finally assigned to the Duke of Modena.

When Maria Teresa turned twelve in the same year 1737, the Emperor insisted again: Ricciarda's uncle, Marquis Carlo Filiberto II d'Este-San Martino (1678 –1752), was instructed to go to Massa and reopen negotiations on behalf of Francesco III d'Este, Duke of Modena, father of the groom. The regent consented and the marriage contract was signed on 20 March 1738. By virtue of it the bride was given a large dowry of one hundred thousand scudi, and it was agreed that, after the wedding, she should call upon her husband as co-ruler of her states. For his part, the Duke of Modena undertook to increase by twenty thousand scudi, with his own funds, each of the dowries established for Maria Teresa's two younger sisters by their late father. As the newly invested Count of Novellara, he also pledged to allow the separation, in favour of Ricciarda Gonzaga, of her family's allodial estates from the county's feudal rights, and to leave her the full governance of the fiefdom for life, "so that the transferor would retain but his sovereign rights, of which he may not divest himself."

The marriage was postponed until 1741, when Ercole reached the age of fourteen. The wedding was celebrated by proxy in Massa on 16 April, with Maria Teresa's great-uncle, Carlo Filiberto d'Este-San Martino representing the groom. The bride remained in her homeland until the autumn but started an intense correspondence with her father-in-law, showing how warmly she did welcome the marriage.

Relations between the spouses were immediately contentious. Ercole had been forced into the marriage by his father and showed a profound intolerance towards his wife (which over time would grow into disgust). He made public displays of contempt towards her, threatening to send her back to Massa, and asked her to have their marriage annulled, saying 'Look, I understand that you are not for me and I am not for you, so tell the Duke that I will be content'. The Duchess reported these words to her great-uncle, complaining of her treatment:

Thus, I have lost my nerve in this: in any case I intend to try, obliging him with a world of niceties, and, if I do not even succeed in this way, I would then beg your assistance in dissolving this marriage. I am not only afflicted by the present but even more by thinking of the future, considering that if these first months have been so distressing for me, when for all others they are joyful, what will come in the future of having to live with such bad-hearted people. Forgive me for writing so poorly, but I am writing from bed, because it is necessary for me to withdraw from sight in order not to be seen, being so restricted and always having a hundred eyes on me. I pray you convey my regards to the Marquise and your little ladies, to whom I wish a better fate than I have had, and again I recommend myself with all reverence.

— Quoted in Alessandro Giulini, Nuovi documenti per le nozze Cybo Estensi, pp. 279-280

In June 1744, having reached the age of majority, she was invested as ruler of the Duchy of Massa and Principality of Carrara by Emperor Charles VII and took over ruling from her mother, who continued to assist her during her absences until her own death in 1768.

Maria Teresa's relationship with her husband continued to be tense at least until mid-1745, exacerbated by his extramarital affairs. He made no attempt to even hide them despite Maria Teresa's repeated appeals to her father-in-law and his admonitions to his son. The marriage improved during the time they spent in exile in Venice following the Austro-Piedmontese occupation. 'I will tell you', Maria Teresa wrote to her father-in-law in December 1746, 'that I am very happy with the prince, as he has completely changed and has modified his manners [...] You will have the consolation when you come of seeing us get along together in very good harmony'.

As a results of this short period of harmony, the couple had their first child and only daughter, Maria Beatrice in 1750. When Maria Teresa gave birth to their only son in 1753 (who just lived four months), it was believed that there would be no more children due to the deterioration in their relationship. This would mean the extinction of the main branch of the House of Este, as Salic law excluded Maria Beatrice from the succession. Thus, in 1753, a double treaty was signed with the House of Habsburg-Lorraine betrothing the Princess to Empress Maria Theresa's third son. The Arcduke was designated as successor by the Duke of Modena in case of the extinction of the Este. The Habsburgs promised never to annex the Este duchies to their own domains but to preserve them distinctly as a sort of tertiogeniture under the new dynasty of Austria-Este.

Maria Teresa and Ercole unofficially separated. In January 1768, Ercole formally asked his father to recognise their separation. Maria Teresa distanced herself from the court, visiting her Tuscan states in the summer and withdrawing often to Reggio, the second capital of the Este duchies, where she resided in the Palazzo della Cittadella. From 1771, she lived permanently in Reggio, with rare formal appearances in Modena. She was regularly visited by her daughter and son-in-law, Ferdinand Karl of Habsburg-Lorraine.

=== Death ===
Maria Teresa died on 29 December 1790 in Reggio Emilia, at the age of 65, and was buried in the Basilica della Ghiara. She was succeeded by her daughter.

== Issue ==
Maria Teresa and Ercole III had 2 children:

- Maria Beatrice Ricciarda (7 April 1750 – 14 November 1829); married Archduke Ferdinand Karl in 1771, and became the Archduchess of Austria-Este. Had issue.
- Rinaldo Francesco (4 January 1753 – 5 May 1753); died in infancy.

== Ancestry ==
Ancestors of Maria Teresa Cybo-Malaspina

8. Alberico Cybo-Malaspina, Duke of Massa and Prince of Carrara
4. Carlo Cybo-Malaspina, Duke of Massa and Prince of Carrara
9. Fulvia Pico, daughter of Alessandro I Pico, Duke of Mirandola
2. Alderano Cybo-Malaspina, Duke of Massa and Prince of Carrara
10. Camillo Pamphili, Prince of Valmontone & San Martino
5. Teresa Pamphilj
11. Olimpia Aldobrandini, Princess di Meldola & Rossano,
1. Maria Teresa Cybo-Malaspina, Duchess of Massa and Princess of Carrara
12. Alfonso Gonzaga, Count of Novellara
6. Camillo III Gonzaga, Count of Novellara
13. Ricciarda Cybo-Malaspina, Princess of Massa
3. Ricciarda Gonzaga
14. Sigismondo III d'Este, Marquis of San Martino
7. Matilde d'Este
15. Maria Teresa Grimaldi

== Notes ==
Maria Teresa Cybo-Malaspina House of Cybo-Malaspina Born: 29 June 1725 Died: 29 December 1790
Italian royalty
Preceded by Charlotte Aglaé d'Orléans	Duchess Consort of Modena and Reggio; 1780–1790	Succeeded by Maria Beatrice of Savoy (1815)
Preceded by Alderano I Cybo-Malaspina	Sovereign Duchess of Massa and Sovereign Princess of Carrara; 1731–1790	Succeeded by Maria Beatrice d'Este
Preceded by Alderano I Cybo-Malaspina	Duchess of Ajello; 1731–1790	Succeeded by Maria Beatrice d'Este
