= Carlo Filiberto II d'Este =

Carlo Filiberto
- Marquis of San Martino; Marquis of Borgomanero and Porlezza

Marquis of San Martino
- Reign: 1732 – 1752
- Predecessor: Sigismondo III d'Este
- Successor: Title ceased

Marquis of Borgomanero and Porlezza
- Reign: 1734 – 1752
- Predecessor: Gabriele d'Este
- Successor: Title ceased
- Born: 16 March 1678; San Martino in Rio
- Died: 30 April 1752 (aged 74)
- Spouse: Teresa Sfondrati
- Issue Detail: Anna Ricciarda; Alfonsina Teresa; Maria Marina
- House: Este of San Martino
- Father: Sigismondo III d'Este
- Mother: Maria Teresa Grimaldi
- Religion: Catholicism

Carlo Filiberto II d'Este (16 March 1678 – 30 April 1752) was an Italian nobleman who was the last Marquis of San Martino.

== Early life ==
Carlo Filiberto d'Este was born on 16 March 1678, to Sigismondo III d'Este and Maria Teresa of Monaco.

== Inheritence ==
Carlo Filiberto's elder brother, Francesco Filippo, was mentally challenged, hence, in 1727, their father managed to Francesco Filippo to renounce his claims in favour of Carlo Filiberto.

== Reign ==
In 1732, upon his father's death, he succeeded him in the title of marquis and in the rights to govern the fiefdom.

In 1734 he went to Milan and married Teresa Sfondrati, of the noble Sfondrati family.

Starting from 1737, Duke Rinaldo d'Este entrusted him with the negotiation, together with Count Michele Torretti, of the marriage between Prince Ercole Rinaldo d'Este and Duchess Maria Teresa Cybo-Malaspina, who was also the great-niece of the Marquis himself. The union of the future Duke Ercole III with Cybo-Malaspina allowed the Duchy of Modena and Reggio to acquire the territories of the Duchy of Massa and Principality of Carrara and therefore, through Garfagnana, access to the sea.

== Death ==
Carlo Filiberto II d'Este died on 30 April 1752 without male heirs; he was the last prince of San Martino and of the annexed jurisdictions and with him ended the Sigismondi line of the cadet branch of the Este di San Martino, begun in 1490.

On 12 April 1753, with a Ferrari deed, the territories of San Martino in Rio and Campogalliano were ceded by the Ducal Chamber of Este to the Marchioness Teresa Sfondrati for a period of three years. In 1756 the contract was renewed in favour of her daughter Anna Ricciarda, who the previous year had married Prince Alberico Barbiano di Belgiojoso The stipulated contract was renewed, again with a Ferrari deed, in 1758 and extended until the end of 1767, after which year the territory would have returned definitively to the Ducal Chamber.

The territory of Castellarano and its fortress were instead sold by the Ducal Chamber to the Marquis Valotti as early as 1754.

== Issue ==
In 1734 Carlo Filiberto II married Teresa Sfondrati (2 April 1710 – 11 January 1773), daughter of Giuseppe Valeriano, IV Duke of Montemarciano, and his wife Maria Campeggi. The couple had three daughters together:

- Anna Ricciarda (2 July 1735 – 3 May 1777), married in 1757 Prince Alberico Barbiano di Belgiojoso
- Alfonsina Teresa (14 March 1737 – 1771), married in 1762 Count Moscardo Moscardo, descendant of the naturalist Lodovico Moscardo;
- Maria Marina (22 February 1739 – 2 September 1787), married in 1759 Prince Lorenzo Onofrio Colonna, XI Prince of Paliano, Prince Assistant to the Papal Throne.
