= Francesco Fulvio Frugoni =

Italian Baroque poet, writer and literary critic (1620–1686)

Francesco Fulvio Frugoni OM
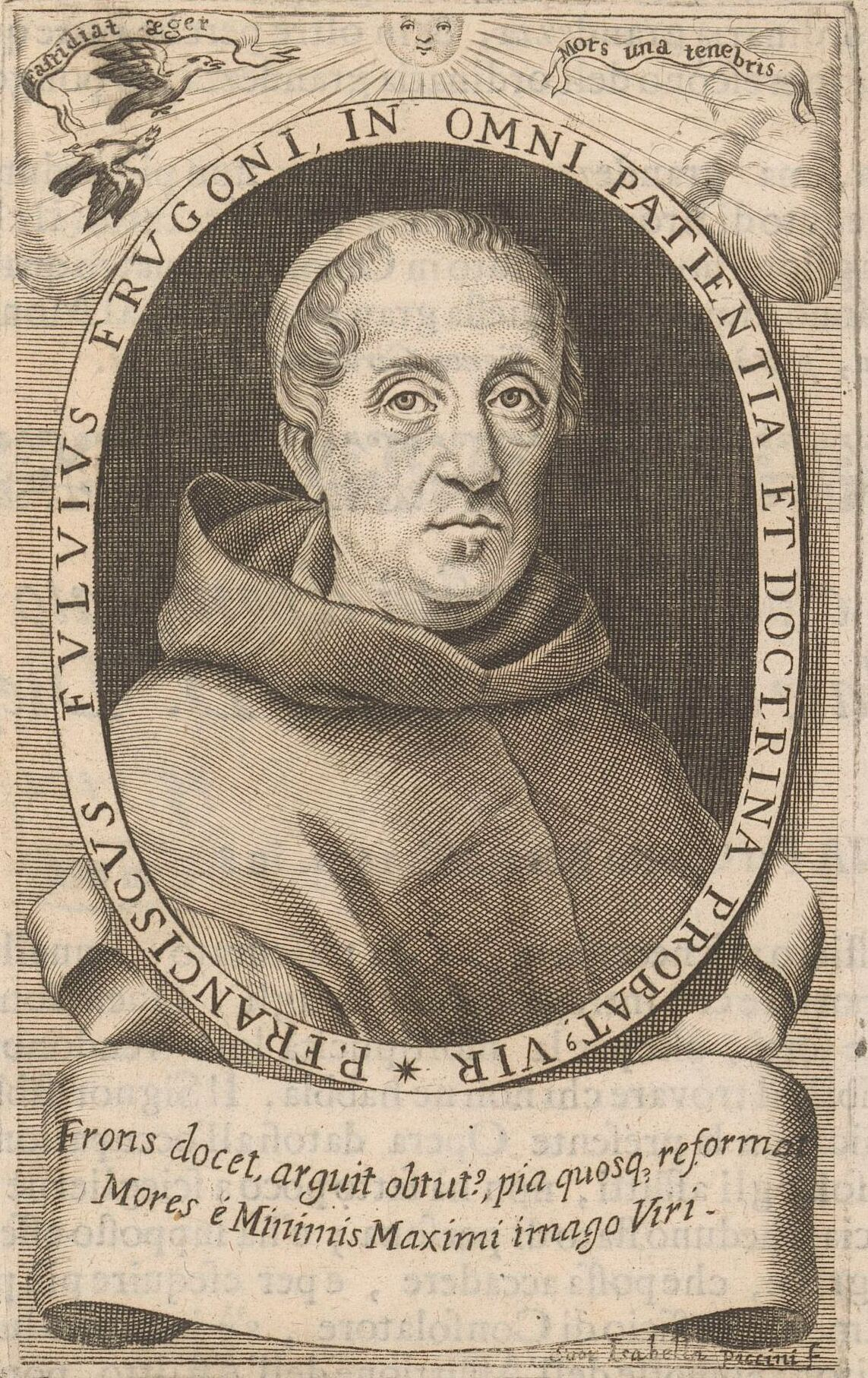
- Portrait of Francesco Fulvio Frugoni by Isabella Piccini
- Born: 1620; Genoa, Republic of Genoa
- Died: 1686 (aged 65–66); Venice, Republic of Venice
- Other name: Flaminio Filauro
- Education: University of Alcalá; University of Salamanca; Sorbonne University
- Occupations: Christian monk; Writer; Poet; Literary critic
- Writing career
- Language: Italian
- Genres: Novel; poem; drama
- Notable work: Il cane di Diogene
- Movement: Baroque

Francesco Fulvio Frugoni OM (1620 – 1686), was an Italian Baroque poet, writer and literary critic, one of the masters of Italian conceptismo.

== Biography ==
Born in Genoa in 1620 to a family of the Genoese nobility, Frugoni spent his youth in Spain, where he attended the universities of Alcalá and Salamanca and met several of the foremost Spanish baroque writers of the period, including Luis de Góngora and Francisco de Quevedo. In 1637, upon his return to Genoa, he entered the Order of Minims and in 1643 he joined the household of Anton Giulio Brignole-Sale, the ambassador of the Republic of Genoa to Spain. After a second sojourn in Spain, Frugoni traveled throughout Europe, visiting the Dutch Republic, England, and France, where he attended the Sorbonne. In 1652, he became adviser to the Duchess of Valentinois Maria Aurelia Spinola, widow of Ercole Grimaldi, prince of Monaco. While he traveled with her through France and Italy, he continued to cultivate his literary interests and became friends with Emanuele Tesauro, the most important Italian literary theorist of the baroque era. After the death of the duchess in 1670, Frugoni moved to Venice, where he completed his masterpiece, the philosophical novel Il cane di Diogene (The Dog of Diogenes, 1689), which was published posthumously. Frugoni died in Venice in 1686.

== Works ==
Frugoni's earliest effort is a satirical poem in ottava rima entitled La Guardinfanteide, published in 1643 with the pseudonym of Flaminio Filauro, a satire on the hoop skirt, a novel fashion in women's dress imported into Italy from Spain.

Frugoni's masterpiece, Il cane di Diogene, was published right after his death between 1687 and 1689. It consists of twelve tales written in an amusing, extravagant, and satirical vein. The book is divided up into seven books, dubbed latrati or barks, attacks on the learned, manners, morality and the court. Frugoni recounts the fantastic wanderings of Saetta, the dog of the cynical philosopher Diogenes of Sinop, who describes his adventures with his master. The narrator is Saetta while Frugoni comments his story. In the tenth tale, entitled Il Tribunal della Critica (The Court of Criticism), the dog manages to visit Mount Parnassus, and his observations there touching upon literary theory and criticism constitute the core of the book. Frugoni reveals himself to be a supporter of modern culture in his preference for the poetry of Torquato Tasso and Giambattista Marino over the masters of the Trecento: Dante, Petrarch, and Boccaccio. His own prose provides an outstanding example of Italian baroque style, with its emphasis on metaphors and conceits prescribed in the famous treatise Il cannocchiale aristotelico written by his friend Emanuele Tesauro. Il cane di Diogene displays many of the characteristics of the 17th-century prose romance, but also carries intimations of the 18th-century philosophical fiction.

Frugoni wrote also a number of librettos, lyric poems, orations, and novels, including, the religious novel La vergine parigina (The Parisian Virgin, 1661), and a romanticized biography of the duchess Maria Aurelia Spinola, entitled L'heroina intrepida (The Intrepid Heroine, 1673). Frugoni is an important figure in the history of opera. The essay he wrote to accompany his own "opera melodrammatica," L'Epulone, published in Venice in 1675, is the first instance in which a poet of serious literary aspirations deigned to criticize contemporary librettists. In L'Epulone Frugoni wrote a libretto to illustrate the critical ideas which he hoped would set a new standard in libretto writing. He was one of the first to undertake reform to make librettos more sober, condemning unrealistic and exaggerated elements and demanding for greater verisimilitude in plots and for literary dignity in texts, thus anticipating the work of Zeno and Metastasio.

Frugoni mastered Spanish and French, and had a thorough knowledge of contemporary European literature. Despite recent interest in Baroque literature, the enormous length of Il cane di Diogene, which extends over more than four thousand pages, has kept it from receiving the critical attention it deserves. Many of his works are not yet available in modern critical editions.

== Bibliography ==
- Slawinski, M. (2002). "Frugoni, Francesco Fulvio". The Oxford Companion to Italian Literature. Oxford University Press. ISBN 978-0-19-818332-7.
- Calcaterra, Carlo (1911). Il Frugoni prosatore. Asti: Tip. Paglieri e Raspi.
- Croce, Benedetto (1929). Storia dell'età barocca in Italia. Bari: Laterza. pp. 151, 159, 175, 389–390, 429–436.
- Freeman, Robert (1968). "Apostolo Zeno's Reform of the Libretto". Journal of the American Musicological Society. 21 (3): 321–341. doi:10.2307/830538. JSTOR 830538.
- Accame Bobbio, Aurelia (1970). "Frugoni, Francesco Fulvio". Enciclopedia Dantesca. Istituto dell'Enciclopedia Italiana.
- Zandrino, Barbara (1984). Il mondo alla rovescia: saggi su Francesco Fulvio Frugoni. Florence: Alinea.
- Formichetti, Gianfranco (1998). "FRUGONI, Francesco Fulvio". Dizionario Biografico degli Italiani (in Italian). Vol. 50: Francesco 1. Sforza–Gabbi. Rome: Institute of the Italian Encyclopaedia. ISBN 978-88-12-00032-6.
- Marini, Quinto (2000). Frati barocchi: studi su A.G. Brignole Sale, G.A. De Marini, A. Aprosio, F. F. Frugoni, e P. Segneri. Modena: Mucchi.
- C., A. (2001). "Un'importante edizione Frugoniana". Italianistica: Rivista di letteratura italiana. 30 (2): 476. JSTOR 23937143.
- Armanini, Sofia (2003). "Un'enciclopedia picaresca. Lingua e cultura spagnole nel «cane di Diogene» di Francesco Fulvio Frugoni". Studi Secenteschi. 44: 3–120.
- Conrieri, Davide (2018). "Una traduzione settecentesca spagnola dai Ritratti critici di Francesco Fulvio Frugoni". Traduzioni, riscritture, ibridazioni: prosa e teatro fra Italia, Spagna e Portogallo. Florence: Leo S. Olschki. pp. 41–51. doi:10.1400/249629.
- Canova, Mauro (2014). "Francesco Fulvio Frugoni librettista: commento a Innocenza riconosciuta (1653), Le vittorie di Minerva (1655), Epulone (1675)". Teatro e teatralità a Genova e in Liguria: drammaturghi, registi, attori, scenografi, impresari e organizzatori. Vol. 3. Bari: Edizioni di Pagina. pp. 47–73. doi:10.1400/229410.
- Cutrì, Maicol (2018). "Il ritratto dell'ozioso. Le citazioni morali di Francesco Fulvio Frugoni". Parole Rubate (17): 105–119. hdl:10807/132204.
- Baldan, Andrea (2022). "The Power of Glosses: Francesco Fulvio Frugoni's Self-Commentary and Literary Criticism in the Tribunal della Critica" (PDF). Glossator. 12: Commenting and Commentary as an Interpretive Mode in Medieval and Early Modern Europe: 157–182.
