= Ercole d'Este =

Ercole d'Este may refer to:

- Ercole I d'Este, Duke of Ferrara and Duke of Modena and Reggio (r. 1471–1505)
- Ercole II d'Este, Duke of Ferrara and Duke of Modena and Reggio (r. 1534–1559)
- Ercole III d'Este, Duke of Modena and Duke of Reggio (r. 1780–1796)
