= Jeanne Marie of Monaco =

- Born: Jeanne-Marie-Dévote Grimaldi; 14 January 1662; Monaco
- Died: 21 April 1741 (aged 79); Sanremo
Names
- French: Jeanne-Marie-Dévote; Italian: Giovanna Maria Devota
- House: Grimaldi
- Father: Louis I, Prince of Monaco
- Mother: Catherine Charlotte de Gramont
- Religion: Roman Catholicism

Jeanne Marie of Monaco (Jeanne-Marie-Dévote, 14 January 1662 – 21 April 1741) was a Monégasque princess who later became a nun.

== Biography ==
Jeanne-Marie-Dévote was born on 14 January 1662 in Monaco, she was the fifth child and third daughter of Prince Louis I and Catherine Charlotte de Gramont.

In 1678, she became a Visitandine nun, adopting the name Louise-Marie-Thérèse. In Sanremo, she was the mother superior for three terms between 1709 and 1739 at the monastery of the Visitation.

Jeanne Marie died in Sanremo on 21 April 1741.
