= San Carlo Borromeo, San Martino in Rio =

Church building in San Martino in Rio, Italy

Coordinates: 44°43′51″N 10°47′12″E

Santa Carlo Borromeo is a Baroque style, Roman Catholic church located on Via Rubiera #1 in the town of San Martino in Rio, province of Reggio Emilia, region of Emilia-Romagna, Italy.

== History ==
The church was erected under the patronage of Marquis Carlo Filiberto of the House of Este San Martino. The original vault is concealed above the Baroque panelled ceiling. On the left of the nave are three chapels. This church acquired works from suppressed monasteries including polychrome scagliola altars. The main altarpiece with a carved tabernacle dates from the 18th century.

Among the altarpieces is a 17th-century copy of the Notte by Antonio Correggio; this painting was once in the Basilica of San Prospero in Reggio Emilia, and was sold to Dresden. The canvases depicting St Sebastian (1521) were likely once part of a larger canvas, painted by Ercole Banci.
