= Sigismondo III d'Este =

- 4th Marquis of Lanzo with Bonzo, Groscavallo and Forno; 4th Marquis of San Martino in Rio; 6th Count of Corteolona, Lord of Campogalliano, Castellarano

Marquis of San Martino
- Reign: 1653 – 1732
- Predecessor: Filippo II Francesco d'Este
- Successor: Carlo Filiberto II d'Este

Marquis of Lanzo
- Reign: 1653 – 1720
- Predecessor: Filippo II Francesco d'Este
- Successor: Title abolished
- Born: 1647
- Died: 28 August 1732 (aged 84–85); Parma
- Spouse: Maria Teresa Grimaldi (m. 1671; died 1723)
- Issue Detail: Francesco Filippo; Matilde Aurelia Maria; Maria Anna; Margherita; Contardo; Carlo Filiberto; Alfonso; Aurelia
- House: House of Este (San Martino branch)
- Father: Filippo II Francesco d'Este
- Mother: Margherita di Savoia

Sigismondo III d'Este (1647 – 28 August 1732), son of Filippo II Francesco d'Este and Margherita of Savoy (illegitimate daughter of Charles Emmanuel I of Savoy), was Prince of the Holy Roman Empire.

== Biography ==
Sigismondo was the son of Marquis Filippo II Francesco d'Este and Margherita of Savoy, legitimized daughter of the Duke of Savoy, Charles Emmanuel I.

In 1653, upon the death of his father, at only six years old, he inherited the titles and the fiefdom, under the regency of his mother.

On 18 November 1671 he married in Maria Teresa Grimaldi, in Turin, she was the daughter of Ercole Grimaldi, hereditary prince of the Principality of Monaco and Aurelia Spinola of the Principality of Molfetta, moving with her to a noble palace in via Santa Teresa 11, in the block of San Giuseppe, in the Santa Teresa district.

As representative of the House of Este at the Habsburg court, in February 1695 he accompanied Duke Rinaldo d'Este to Vienna to obtain the investiture of the Duchy of Modena and Reggio from Leopold I, Holy Roman Emperor.

On 28 November 1695, in the "Great Hall of the Ducal Palace" of Hanover, he represented Duke Rinaldo d'Este in the wedding ceremony with Charlotte Felicitas of Brunswick-Lüneburg , having already previously played a representative role in asking for the princess's hand in marriage to Duke Ernest Augustus of Brunswick-Lüneburg, his uncle.

On 20 July 1723 his wife Maria Teresa Grimaldi died in San Martino in Rio and was buried there in the family tomb of the Collegiate Church of Saints Martino and Venerio.

In 1727 Sigismondo negotiated and obtained from his firstborn son, Francesco Filippo, who was seriously disturbed and compromised by his incorrect life, his renunciation of the dynastic rights in favour of his other surviving male son, Carlo Filiberto II d'Este.

He died in Parma on 28 August 1732 after being taken ill; he was buried in the Church of the Capuchin Fathers of San Martino in Rio.

== Issue ==
Sigismondo married Maria Teresa of Monaco, Mademoiselle de Carladès, on November 18, 1671. They had:

- Matilde Aurelia Maria (1673 - 1732), married Camillo III Gonzaga , 10th Count of Novellara and Bagnolo
- Francesco Filippo (1675 - 1723), known as the Marquis of San Giuliano
- Carlo Filiberto (1679 - 1752), 5th Marquis of San Martino in Rio , 7th Count of Corteolona , Lord of Campogalliano , Castellarano . Lord of the Vicariate of Belgioioso
- Maria Anna Margherita (1680 - ), Angelica Nun in the Monastery of San Paolo in Milan
- Aurelia (1683 - 1719), married Francesco Gambacorta, 4th Duke of Limatola
