= Lodovico Ricci =

Italian historian and economist (1742–1799)

Lodovico Ricci (1742–1799) was an Italian historian and economist.

He was born in Chiari (modern Lombardy), and held different posts in the Duchy of Modena and Reggio, chiefly connected with charity organisations and taxation.

He published the geographical treaty Corografia dei Territori di Modena, Reggio e degli altri Stati già appartenenti alla Casa d'Este, in which are described the main localities of the Duchy of Modena and Reggio.

In 1787 he wrote also Riforma de' pii Istituti della Città di Modena, a monograph with historic, economics and scientific statistics.

== Publications ==
- Ricci, Lodovico (1978). Corografia dei territori di Modena, Reggio, e degli altri stati già appartenenti alla casa d'Este (in Italian). Insubria.
- Ricci, Lodovico (1787). Riforma degl'istituti pii della città di Modena (in Italian). Per gli Eredi di Bartolomeo Soliani Stampatori Ducali.
