= Alderano I Cybo-Malaspina, Duke of Massa =

Alderano I
- Duke of Ferentillo
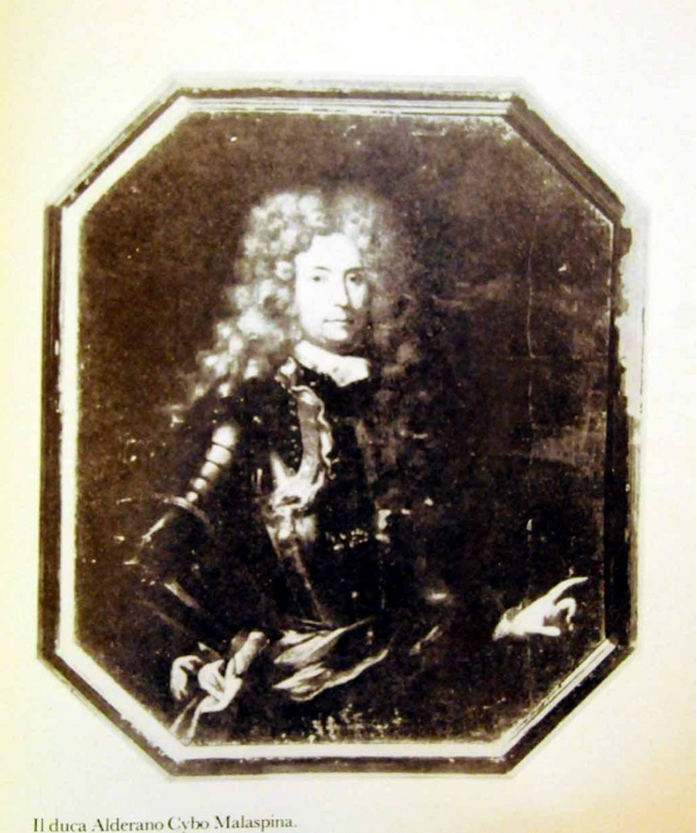

Duke of Massa and Prince of Carrara
- Reign: November 20, 1715 – August 18, 1731
- Predecessor: Alberico III Cybo-Malaspina
- Successor: Maria Teresa Cybo-Malaspina
- Born: 22 July 1690; Massa, Duchy of Massa and Carrara
- Died: 18 August 1731 (aged 41); Massa, Duchy of Massa and Carrara
- Spouse: Ricciarda Gonzaga (m. 1715)
- Issue Detail: Maria Teresa, Duchess of Massa; Maria Anna Matilde; Maria Camilla
- House: Cybo-Malaspina
- Father: Charles II Cybo-Malaspina
- Mother: Teresa Pamphili

Alderano I Cybo-Malaspina (22 July 1690 – 18 August 1731) was the fourth Duke of Massa and Prince of Carrara.

Born as the tenth child of Carlo II Cybo-Malaspina, and younger brother of Alberico III. He was the last male ruler of the House of Cybo-Malaspina. He was succeeded by his daughter, Maria Teresa. His granddaughter, Maria Beatrice d'Este, would become the co-founder of the House of Austria-Este.

== Biography ==
Alderano Cybo-Malaspina was born in Massa on 22 July 1690, he was the son of the reigning duke and his wife, the papal noblewoman Teresa Pamphili (1650-1704), daughter of the former cardinal Camillo Francesco Maria Pamphili. When Alderano was born, his father was fifty-nine years old and his elder brothers were much older than him; he was therefore raised in a certain isolation and was then sent for many years to boarding school first in Rome and later in Parma, where he learned the "sciences and arts of chivalry".

Upon his return to Massa, he was unable to fit in properly with his father's court and even made two short-lived "escapes" abroad, in 1709 and 1710, after which he was excluded from court. However, when, in December 1710, his father died, his successor Alberico III, Alderano's first-born brother, readmitted him to court. Not only that, but since the marriage of the new duke with the Genoese noblewoman Nicoletta Clotilde Grillo (1681-1779) had been sterile, and the second-born Camillo was on his way to an ecclesiastical career (he would later become Latin Patriarch of Constantinople, and then cardinal), Alderano was recognised as heir presumptive to the duchy and was granted the honorary title of Prince of Carrara which traditionally belonged to heirs apparent.

On 29 April 1715 Alderano married in Milan his second cousin, Ricciarda Gonzaga, the only surviving daughter of Camillo III, Count of Novellara and Bagnolo.

A few months later, Alberico III died, but, in order to effectively succeed him, Alderano was forced to come to terms with his other brother Camillo, who preceded him in the order of succession. With an agreement stipulated on 2 December 1715, the latter renounced all his rights to the duchy, but only on condition of retaining for himself as an appanage all the allodial and feudal assets possessed by the family in the Papal State and in the kingdom of Naples, and in particular the duchies of Ferentillo and Ajello and the lordship of Paduli. The formal imperial investiture of the duchy of Massa and Carrara was granted to Alderano with a diploma of Emperor Charles VI dated 17 April 1717.

Alderano's government of the duchy soon proved to be fraught with difficulties. Already in 1716, he had to face a frontier crisis with the Republic of Lucca, which possessed the exclave of Montignoso on the southern border of the Duchy, and, the following year, an insurrection of the inhabitants of Carrara against the tax burden; both crises were resolved only thanks to the intervention of the emperor.

The most serious problem, however, was the duchy's finances, exhausted by the contributions for the War of the Spanish Succession and impoverished by the renunciation of Roman and Neapolitan revenues in favour of Camillo. And now they proved unable to support Alderano's court and his profligate lifestyle.

After selling everything he could of the family estate, from silverware to artillery, Alderano finally believed he had found the solution to his problems by putting the sovereign duchy itself on the market.

There was talk of a purchase by the Este family of Modena, or by Duke Giuseppe Lotario Conti, Pope Innocent XIII's brother, a project that never came to fruition due to the lack of support from the pontiff himself.

In 1724, Alderano began secret negotiations with the Republic of Genoa in order to reach the definitive alienation of the duchy to the Genoese. However, when the agreement had practically been reached, the Duchess Ricciarda, a capable and resolute woman, intervened and leaked her husband's plans to the Emperor and the Grand Duke of Tuscany, who certainly did not look favourably on a possible Genoese expansion, and the affair was thwarted through the intervention of an imperial commissioner.

Practically at the same time, in 1725, the Duchess finally gave birth to her first daughter, Maria Teresa, who was followed, over the next three years, by two more daughters. In this period, thanks above all to the intervention of Ricciarda, the financial situation of the duchy improved somewhat.

The fact that the duke's offspring were all female, while certainly unwelcome, did not constitute an insurmountable succession problem, given that Salic law did not apply in the duchy by virtue of the decree of 16 July 1529 with which the emperor Charles V had granted the investiture of the marquisate of Massa and lordship of Carrara suo jure to Alderano's ancestress, Ricciarda Malaspina, to her male descendants or, in their absence, even to her female descendants, a principle whose validity Alderano had confirmed by the emperor shortly before his death in 1731.

In his will, drawn up a few days before his death, Maria Teresa was named universal heir and the regency was entrusted to his wife and his brother Camillo. Ricciarda took over the government with a firm hand: her regency was formally confirmed by an imperial diploma dated 15 September 1732, with which she was officially invested with the guardianship of her daughters, and she then legally maintained it until June 1744, when Maria Teresa, having reached the age of majority, was officially invested with the duchy by the emperor Charles VII. In fact, until her own death in 1768, Ricciarda would act as a substitute for her daughter, often absent from Massa as she was married to the heir to the ducal throne of Modena, Ercole Rinaldo d'Este.

== Marriage and issue ==
On 29 April 1715, in Milan, Alderano had married his distant cousin Ricciarda Gonzaga, daughter of Camillo III Gonzaga, eighth count of Novellara and Bagnolo, and of Princess Matilde d'Este of San Martino in Rio. The new marriage, however, also seemed to be heading towards sterility for many years, like that of his predecessor. Regardless, Alderano and Ricciarda eventually had three daughters in rapid succession, over the course of three years and one month:

- Maria Teresa Cybo-Malaspina (29 June 1725 – 25 December 1790, buried in the Temple of the Blessed Virgin of Ghiara in Reggio) succeeded her father in the government of the state, and was from 1780 Duchess consort (although separated from her husband) of Modena and Reggio;
- Princess Donna Maria Anna Matilde (15 August 1726 – 8 October 1797), married in 1748 Don Orazio Albani, II Prince of Soriano nel Cimino, Patrician of Urbino and Genoese Patrician;
- Princess Donna Maria Camilla (29 April 1728 – 2 August 1760) married in 1755 Don Restaino Gioacchino di Tocco Cantelmo Stuart, fifth Prince of Montemiletto, fifth Prince of Pettorano, Titular Prince of Acaia, tenth Duke of Popoli, fourth Duke of Sicignano and Duke of Apice, Neapolitan Patrician, Venetian Patrician and Grandee of Spain of the First Class.
