= Aurelia Spinola =

Genoese noblewoman and princess of Monaco

Princess heir consort of Monaco
- Born: 1620; Genoa
- Died: 29 September 1670 (aged 49–50); Aix-en-Provence
- Spouse: Prince Ercole, Marquis of Baux
- Issue: Louis I, Prince of Monaco
Names
- Maria Aurelia Spinola
- House: House of Spinola (by birth); House of Grimaldi (by marriage)
- Father: Luca Spinola
- Mother: Pellina Spinola

Aurelia Spinola (1620‍–‍1670), was a Genoese noblewoman, Princess of Monaco by her marriage to Prince Ercole, Marquis de Beaux, whom she survived after his accidental death in the use of a firearm. Their eldest son, Louis I of Monaco, became Prince of Monaco upon the death of his grandfather.

== Biography ==
=== Birth and youth ===
Aurelia Spinola was born in 1620 in Genoa as daughter of Luca Spinola (son of Gaspare who was the son of Gioffredo, Prince of Molfetta) and of Pellina Spinola (daughter of Giovanni Battista Spinola, 1st Duke of San Pietro, and Maria Spinola, daughter of Filippo). Luca Spinola, her father, was an influential figure who owned many palaces, including the palace today known as Spinola Pessagno located on the hill of Santa Caterina. She was heir to part of the great inheritance of her paternal uncle Giovanni Stefano Doria and brother of Brigida Spinola, painted by Peter Paul Rubens in 1606. Pellina, her mother, was a woman of strong character considered to be the head of the House of Spinola.

Aurelia grew up in a rich aristocratic atmosphere, open to Europe and very cosmopolitan, a life made up of salons, receptions, banquets and meetings. Thanks to her parents, she experienced social life and received a refined education. She knew how to read, write and count, and her mother made sure that she also mastered singing, music, dancing and embroidery. It was only later that she approached religion and prayer, which would serve as a continual comfort to her in the dramatic moments of her existence. She had a particular devotion to the crucifix and although she felt drawn to the religious vocation, she knew she was destined to marry. During her parents' trip to Naples to manage their Molfetta estate, Aurelia spent time at the convent of San Silvestro in Pisa where lived one of her maternal aunts, Sister Maria Serafina.

=== Marriage ===
When Ercole Grimaldi, Marquis des Baux, son of Prince Honoré II of Monaco and Ippolita Trivulzio, asks for her hand, Luca and Pellina readily accepted, preferring a good marriage to a life in a convent for their daughter. She was the second woman of the Genoese House of Spinola to enter into a matrimonial alliance with the House of Grimaldi after the betrothing of Lucchina Spinola to Charles I, Lord of Monaco (d. 1357) who acceded to the throne on 12 September 1331.

In 1640, Honoré secretly appealed to Cardinal Richelieu to suppress the Spanish garrison that had been based in Monaco since the Treaty of Tordesillas (1524), while tilting the balance of the Principality's alliances towards France. For some, this love marriage with a pro-Spanish family undermined the rapprochement with the French, while for others, the aim of the marriage with a Genoese aristocrat belonging to an openly philosophical family was as if Honoré, to deceive the Spanish, were demonstrating an unshakable alliance. The marriage was celebrated in Monaco on 7 July 1641, and the celebrations lasted three days.

A few months later, on 17 November 1641, Honoré succeeded in a coup d'état by eliminating the Spanish garrison, and, on November 24, and a French garrison took control of Le Rocher. Aurelia's situation was already delicate before her husband's actions; considered at Court as a spy and a possible traitor to Monegasque pro-French policy, she nevertheless appropriated the customs and uses of her new homeland.

=== Duchess of Valentinois ===
On 2 August 1641, Aurelia accompanied Prince Ercole and their adult son Louis on a pilgrimage to the church of the Recollects in Menton, when suddenly, during a blank shot after dinner in the garden of Saint-Ambroise, near the convent of Carnolès, one of the guards accidentally killed Prince Ercole. Aurélia, against the wishes of her parents, decided to stay at the Monegasque Court for the good of her children. She received letters of condolence and affection from the French court, notably from the regent Anne of Austria, who reigned in the name of her son the future Louis XIV who was only 13 years old. However, Aurelia soon found herself isolated and helpless. Relations with her father-in-law deteriorated despite an apparent façade of courtesy, notably because of the intrigues ordered by the court favorite of Honoré II, but also because of their difference in fortune; with the death of her husband, her father-in-law now became separated of any claim on the immense property of the Spinola family which remained faithful to Spain.

To satisfy the wishes of her mother who wanted her to remarry, Aurelia left Monaco and went to Genoa with some of her children; Luc, Marie Pelline and Marie Jeanne. Louis, the eldest and heir to the throne, stayed with her grandfather Honoré II. On the occasion of the galleys' stopover in Savona, Pellina organized a large reception, officially announcing her intention to remarry her daughter. In the meantime, Luc, her youngest son, fell ill and was brought to Genoa by his grandfather Luca Spinola. Luc died in Genoa at the age of 4 before being buried there. Honoré accused his daughter-in-law of being responsible for his death. Negotiations were then started by Luca and Pellina Spinola with Honoré II, in order to consider a new marriage for Aurelia. She once again found herself in the middle of the intrigues of her stepfather, who wanted her to take care of his children in Monco, and her mother, Pellina, who wanted her to remarry. At the end, her freedom was the subject of a contract, Honoré offered to pay 10,000 crowns per year so that Aurelia would remain a widow and continue to take care of her children at his court. Aurelia's parents accepted but she felt betrayed. She therefore returned to Monaco and reunited with her son Louis, alternating prayer and cultural entertainment.

In 1656, Aurelia's father Luca Spinola died of the plague. The same year, Honoré II ostracized Aurelia, removing her from Monaco and stripping her of her titles, accusing her of high treason against the loyalty owed to the Court of France. Aurelia left for Paris with the intention of asserting her rights directly in the presence of Louis XIV, who had since become King of France. She remained in Paris for 26 months and continued to demand justice for the recognition of her rights as Duchess of Valentinois against the actions of her father-in-law. In 1661 Aurelia Spinola's first grandson was born; Antoino, future sovereign Prince of Monaco. Honoré II died the following year which allowed Aurélia to get closer to her son Louis, who was well introduced to the Court of France thanks to his marriage to Catherine Charlotte de Gramont.

=== Life of an heiress ===
In 1663, her mother Pellina Spinola died in Genoa and, despite the deep pain, Aurelie found herself an heiress that had to share an immense patrimony with her only sister Veronica. In 1664, after moving to Genoa to the palace on Via Garibaldi, Aurelia found herself faced with another obstacle: a dispute against his sister for the sharing of movable and immovable property from his parents' inheritance. Veronica physically prevented Aurelia, upon her return from Paris, from entering the Palazzo di Strada Nuova and forced her to initiate a costly trial.

=== Last years ===
In 1666, Aurelia finally obtained her titles, her lands, her rights, but in 1667 she began to suffer from abdominal pain. In search of help and care, a long journey began to Provence, Montpellier, Marseille and Monaco, where she was warmly welcomed. She stayed a short time in Aix en Provence before returning to Genoa to follow her business. When she returned to Aix again she was surrounded by friends and continued her treatment, and, despite the pain, she continued to attend masses, ceremonies, violin and organ concerts. Even in the last days of her life her character was put to the test and, resisting the insistence of Cardinal Girolamo Grimaldi-Cavalleroni who wanted to force her to modify her will in favor of her only son Louis, today head of the Grimaldi family of Monaco. She pushed him away vigorously.

Aurelia died in her house in Aix-en-Provence on September 29, 1670. Her heart and brain were offered to the church of La Celle, while her body was transported to Genoa and buried in the church of Santa Teresa in Genoa, guarded by two of her daughters who were nuns at the convent of the Discalced Carmelites . She shared her assets equally between her children, whether they were married or had chosen a religious life.

== Posterity: a contrasted legacy ==
=== A literary hero ===
In 1652, the Franciscan minim Francesco Fulvio Frugoni became advisor to Aurelia Spinola, after his widowhood led him into exile outside Monaco. While traveling with her through France and Italy to different European courts to help her claim her rights, the cleric continued to cultivate his literary interests and became friends with Emanuele Tesauro, the most important Italian literary theorist from the Baroque era. From this adventure with the princess, Frugoni left a fictionalized biography entitled L'heroina intrepida (The intrepid heroine) which he published in 1673 and leaves the testimony of the courage of this mistreated princess whose virtues he describes "with almost maniacal attention to detail."

Too often, the victims of national interests are forgotten. It is Frugoni's message which undoubtedly exaggerates, presenting Aurelia Spinola as a saint, sacrificed on the altar of political reason but who perfectly reincarnates a woman tormented between the love of God and the love for men.

=== A defamed traitor ===
In the archives of the Palace of Monaco and the official histories, little mention is made of Aurelia Spinola, whom the national press of Monaco-Matin, in the context of a political crisis in the Principality, referred to as a Spanish "spy" in 2024.

=== A lasting Monegasque devotion to Saint Aurélie ===
Relics of Aurelia Spinola's patron saint, Saint Aurélie of Rome, were kept by the Spinola family. On the occasion of her marriage to Ercole Grimaldi, these relics were given to the groom's father Honoré II by her own father, Luca Spinola. The relics arrived on 22 July 1641 in Monaco, and were authenticated on the following 3 August by the Bishop of Nice, His Excellency Jacquemin Marenco, with the expertise of a doctor. The cult and a public office were approved the following year by Rome. The feast of Saint Aurélie was celebrated with great fervor every first Sunday in August in Monaco until the French Revolution. She is still in the liturgical proper of the Archdiocese of Monaco of which she is one of the patron saints, with Saint Devota and Saint Roman.

== Descendants ==
Ercole Grimali and Aurélia Spinola had 7 children together in just 10 years, including the following:

- Louis I, Prince of Monoco (b. 25 July 1642)
- Hippolyte Marie of Monaco (b. 1644)
- Marie Jeanne of Monaco (b. 1645)
- Dévote-Marie-Renée of Monaco (b. 1646)
- Luc-François-Marie-Charles of Monaco (b. 1648), called "The Little Knight"
- Maria Teresa of Monaco (b. 1650)
- Marie Pelline of Monaco (b. 1651)

== See also ==
- Grimaldi family
- History of Monaco
- Monaco
