= Bagnolo in Piano =

- Comune
- Comune di Bagnolo in Piano
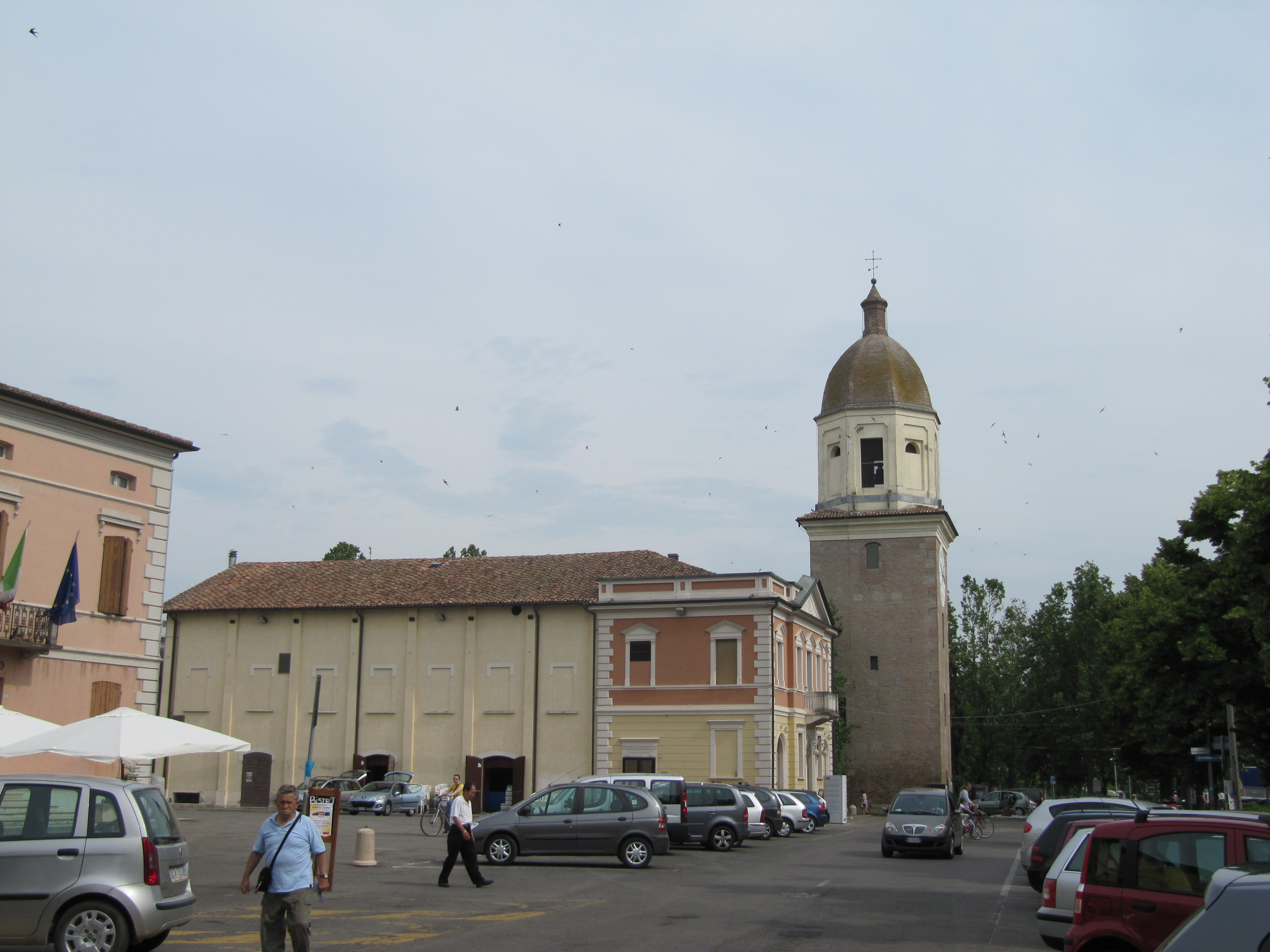
- View of Bagnolo in Piano

- Coat of arms

- Location within Italy Location within Emilia-Romagna
- Coordinates: 44°46′N 10°41′E
- Country: Italy
- Region: Emilia-Romagna
- Province: Reggio Emilia (RE)
- Frazioni: Castello San Michele, Ponte Beviera San Michele, San Tomaso, Pieve Rossa

Government
  - Mayor: Gianluca Paoli (lista civica)

Area
  - Total: 26.7 km^{2} (10.3 sq mi)
- Elevation: 32 m (105 ft)

Population (31 December 2016)
  - Total: 9,788
  - Density: 367/km^{2} (949/sq mi)
- Demonym: Bagnolesi
- Time zone: UTC+1 (CET)
  - Summer (DST): UTC+2 (CEST)
- Postal code: 42011
- Dialing code: 0522

Bagnolo in Piano (Reggiano: Bagnōl in Piân) is a comune (municipality) in the province of Reggio Emilia in the Italian region Emilia-Romagna, located about 60 kilometres (37 mi) northwest of Bologna and about 8 kilometres (5 mi) northeast of Reggio nell'Emilia.

Bagnolo in Piano borders the following municipalities: Cadelbosco di Sopra, Correggio, Novellara, Reggio Emilia. Sights include the Torrazzo, a medieval tower which is what remains of the castle destroyed by the French during the War of Spanish Succession, and the medieval Pieve, in the frazione of Pieve Rossa.

== History ==
According to the tradition, the hamlet was founded in 946 when the bishop of Reggio founded a church here. The local pieve (pleban church) is known from 1144. It was acquired by the House of Gonzaga in 1335 together with Reggio Emilia and Novellara. The local rocca (castle) was rebuilt by Feltrino Gonzaga in 1354.

It was part of the independent County of Novellara and Bagnolo until 1728, when the state was returned to the hands of Charles VI, Holy Roman Emperor. The latter transferred them to the Rinaldo III, Duke of Modena (House of Este) in 1737.

== Twin towns ==
Bagnolo in Piano is twinned with:

- Gemenos, France
- Banino, Poland
