= County of Novellara and Bagnolo =

Former independent state in Northern Italy

County of Novellara and Bagnolo Contea di Novellara e Bagnolo (Italian)
- 1371–1728
- Coat of arms
- Motto: Frangar, non flectar (Latin for 'I will be broken, not bent')
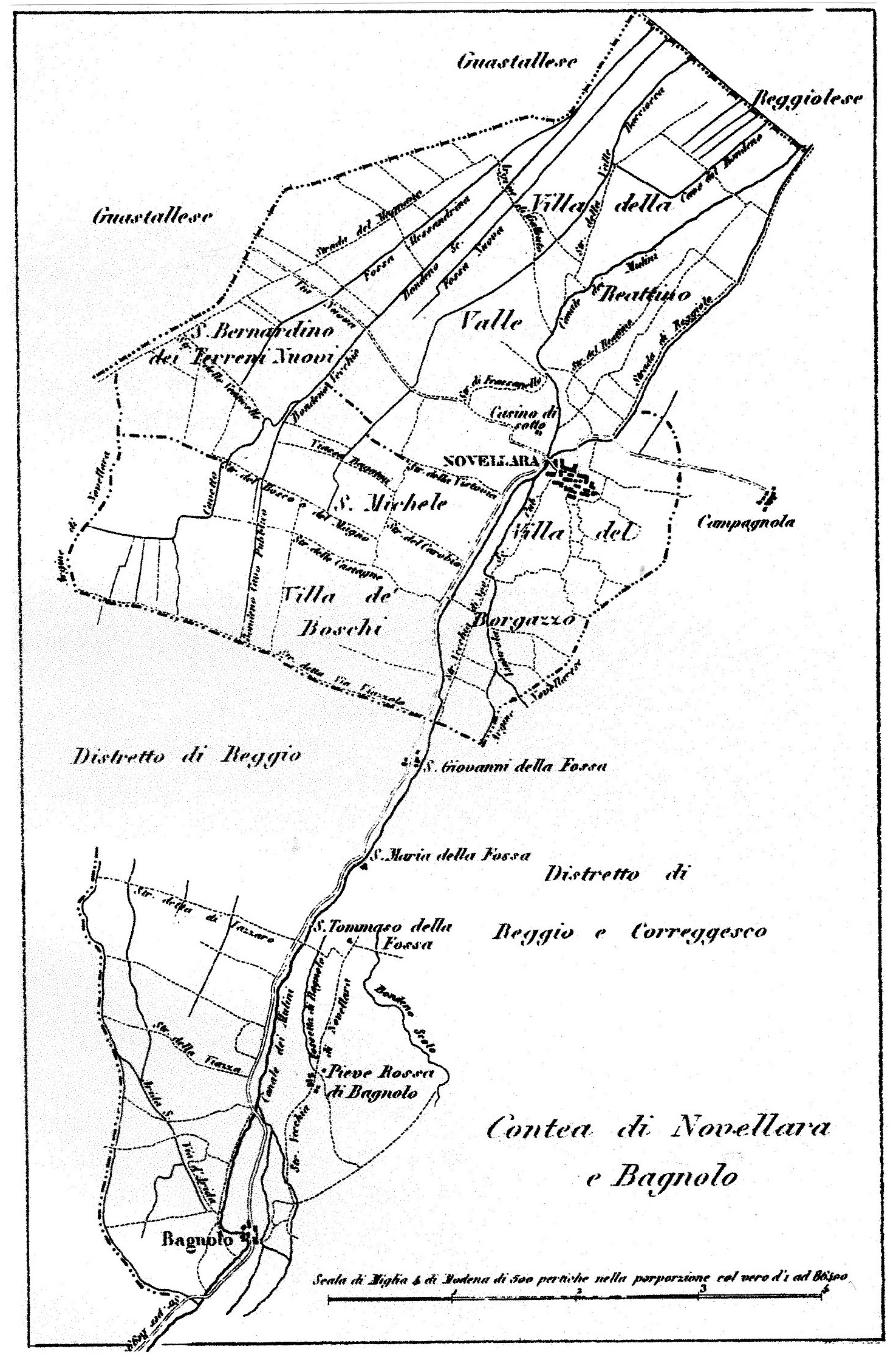
- Status: County
- Capital: Novellara
- Common languages: Emilian-Romagnol; Latin; Italian
- Religion: Roman Catholicism

Government
  - 1371–1374: Feltrino Gonzaga (first Lord)
  - 1501–1515: Giampietro Gonzaga (first Count)
  - 1727–1728: Filippo Alfonso Gonzaga (last Count)
- Historical era: Late Middle Ages, Early modern era
  - Created as a Lordship: 1371
  - Elevated to a County: 1501
  - Vacant fiefdom: 1728
  - Absorbed by the Duchy of Modena: 1737
Succeeded by
Duchy of Modena and Reggio
- Today part of: Italy

The County of Novellara and Bagnolo (Italian: Contea di Novellara e Bagnolo) was a small imperial fiefdom which existed in Northern Italy from 1501 to 1728. Previously, since 1371, the county had been in the form of a lordship of an uncertain legal nature in the possession of the Novellara branch of the House of Gonzaga, who ruled it for a total period of approximately three and a half centuries.

== History ==
On May 17, 1371, Feltrino Gonzaga, lord of Reggio and leader of the anti-Visconti league, after being defeated, was forced to sell the city and the county to Bernabò Visconti for 50,000 gold florins. Feltrino chose to keep for himself only the small territories of Novellara and Bagnolo, located between Reggio and the Lordship of Mantua, which was ruled by the main branch of his family. However, he never went to his new, small state and a few years later, in 1374, he died in conditions of extreme poverty in Padua.

Feltrino was succeeded by his son Guido (1340–1399), who immediately proceeded with the construction of the fortress of Novellara, but the state coffers were so empty that only the foundations could be built. The lordship of Novellara and Bagnolo drew great profits from the duties placed along the roads and canals that connected Reggio to the Po and effectively blocking trade between the Emilian city, Mantua and Venice. The lordship based its autonomy above all on the military service performed by the majority of the male descendants. The Gonzagas of Novellara enlisted in the Papal, French and imperial troops.

Since the right of primogeniture was not applied in the Gonzaga successions of the time, in the following decades there was many a conflict between Feltrino's successors on the forms of sharing power and, for some periods, the lordship was even divided in two parts: Novellara and Bagnolo.

The first partition occurred in 1399 upon the death of Guido, between his sons Giacomo (?–1441) and Feltrino II (?–1424), but was soon overcome due to the extinction of the latter's family line in 1456. In that year the government was reunified in the hands of Giacomo's two sons, Francesco I (ca 1420–1484) and Giorgio (1410–1487), who peacefully shared power for over forty years.

However, the situation worsened again in the last decade of the 1400s between Francesco I's son, Giampietro (1469–1515), heir to the lordship for half, and his four cousins, Giorgio's sons, heirs for one eighth each. The latter initially recognized the former as head of the family, but later, taking advantage of his absence and against the will of one of them, they took control of Bagnolo by force, thus breaking the unity of the lordship again.

To make his control at least over Novellara unchallengeable, Giampietro then asked for the transformation of his small state into an imperial fiefdom and obtained from Holy Roman Emperor Maximilian I, for himself and his male descendants, the investiture as 'Count of Novellara', with an imperial diploma dated 7 July 1501.

His cousins remained in Bagnolo until 1509, when they were deposed and expelled by the Papal troops who invaded their lands during the war of the League of Cambrai. The following year Giampietro bought back the territory of Bagnolo at a high price, reuniting it definitively in the county of Novellara and Bagnolo, which remained under the rule of his descendants for over two centuries.

In 1533 Giampietro's three grandsons, together with their ecclesiastical uncle Giulio Cesare (1505–1550), obtained the joint investiture as co-counts from Holy Roman Emperor Charles V and, at the same time, the authorization to mint coins: the workshop operated until 1678 and Count Alfonso II (1616–1678) was the only one to have his portrait printed on coins. Also in the 16th century the fortress, from a mighty fortress, was transformed into an elegant noble residence with a refined courtyard.

Artists, such as Lelio Orsi, musicians and poets found refuge and welcome at the county residence. Furthermore, many lands were cleared and the vast marshy and unhealthy areas surrounding Novellara and Bagnolo were reclaimed.

Upon the death of Filippo Alfonso Gonzaga, on 12 October 1728, the dynasty became extinct in the male line and Holy Roman Emperor, Charles VI refused to follow up on the deceased Count's will in favour of his sister Ricciarda, who nevertheless administered the county during the interregnum. The county was therefore considered a vacant imperial fief and was later bestowed, in 1737, upon the duke of Modena Rinaldo d'Este in recognition of his services during the war of the Polish Succession. The county therefore became part of the states ruled by the House of Este, whose fortunes it followed until the Unification of Italy. Although annexed by the Este family, the county was left in usufruct, until her death in 1768, to Ricciarda, the last of the Gonzagas of Novellara, widow (since 1731) of the Duke of Massa and Carrara, Alderano I Cybo-Malaspina: their daughter Maria Teresa Cybo-Malaspina, suo jure sovereign Duchess of Massa, later also became Duchess consort (albeit separated) of Modena and Reggio, and therefore also Countess of her maternal family's ancestral fiefdom of Novellara.

== Geography ==
The County of Novellara had a very limited surface area and, moreover, it did not appear as a single territorial entity, but was divided into two centers. It occupied part of what are currently the municipalities of Novellara and Bagnolo in Piano, in the Province of Reggio Emilia. The only two inhabited centers were Novellara and Bagnolo, both equipped with fortifications still visible. The County of Novellara bordered to the north and west with the Duchy of Guastalla, to the east with the Lordship of Correggio and with the Duchy of Modena and Reggio, with which it was also adjacent to the south and west.

Feltrino Gonzaga chose to reserve these lands for himself and his family given the great importance they had, especially from a commercial point of view, for Reggio. The Tassone canal still flows through the territories of the ancient county today, which, in the past, allowed the arrival of goods from the Po to Reggio, in the hands of their eternal enemies, the House of Este. The Gonzagas of Novellara placed heavy duties on this waterway, thus causing serious damage to the economy of Reggio for several centuries.

== Mint of Novellara ==
The Novellara emissions began in 1533 and ended in 1678, with the death of Alfonso II. The Holy Roman Emperor Charles V, granted the counts of Novellara the right to mint coins with a diploma dated 6 April 1533.

The coins minted in the early years were the gold scudo, worth 7.0 lire, the silver 2 lire coins, the silver cavallotto, the parpagliola, the quattrino and the copper soldo.

In addition to these coins, other imitation or counterfeit coins are also mentioned by both Davolio and Celestino Malagoli.

== Sources ==
- Comastri Martinelli, Mirella (2002). Reggio narrata - Il Seicento e il Settecento. Reggio Emilia: Gianni Bizzocchi Editore.
