= Ercole, Marquis of Baux =

Ercole Grimaldi
- Marquis of Baux
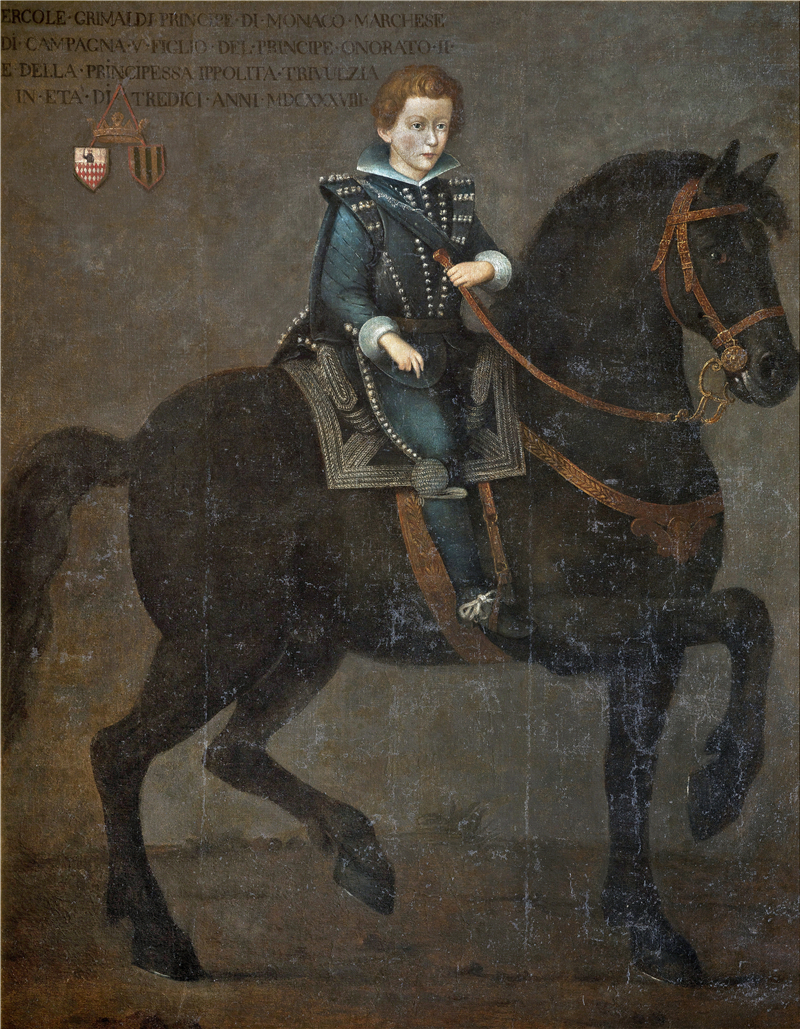
- A painting of a young Ercole Grimaldi (c. 1630/35)
- Born: 16 December 1623; Paris, Kingdom of France
- Died: 2 August 1651 (aged 27); Monte Carlo, Monaco
- Spouse: Maria Aurelia Spinola
- Issue: Louis I, Prince of Monaco; Marie Hippolyte, Princess of Montafia; Jeanne Marie, Princess of Francavilla; Thérèse Marie, Marquise of San Martino
- House: Grimaldi
- Father: Honoré II, Prince of Monaco
- Mother: Ippolita Trivulzio

Ercole Grimaldi, Marquis of Baux (16 December 1623 – 2 August 1651) was a member of the House of Grimaldi. He was the first Monegasque prince and heir apparent to the first Monegasque sovereign prince, Honoré II. Dying at the age of 27, Baux was replaced as heir apparent by his son Louis who succeeded Honoré II.

== Biography ==
=== Early life ===
The only son of Honoré II of Monaco and Ippolita Trivulzio, Grimaldi was the heir apparent to the principality of Monaco which was raised to the status of principality in 1604. Named after his grandfather Hercule, Lord of Monaco, Grimaldi was styled as the Marquis of Baux after 1642, the title being one of the subsidiary titles which had been given to his father by Louis XIII. In fact, Baux was created Marquis by Louis XIII himself. Baux was a skilled military man and led the attack on the Serravalle Tower, taking the sentries prisoner.

=== Death ===
Baux and his wife and their children went to visit the convent of Carnoles in Mentone. After the visit was over Baux relaxed in the gardens by shooting targets with some guards. Anxious to see how a weapon worked, Baux insisted that a guard show it to him. Improperly handling the gun, the guard accidentally shot it towards Baux and the other guards, two of whom were also injured. Baux received a gunshot wound to the spine and, however good the medical care he received, he died the next day on 1 August 1651, at the age of 27. It is said that, despite his wound, he insisted over and over again, as he lay on his deathbed, that the guard who shot him should not be punished as it had been an accident. Nonetheless, the man was imprisoned for a time and even tried to kill himself. After his release he never returned to Monaco. There were subsequent reports that a local monk had predicted Baux's death and that Baux himself had seen a ghost who had told him to enjoy life for he would not be able to in a short time.

== Marriage ==
Grimaldi was married on 4 July 1641 to Maria Aurelia Spinola, a daughter of Luca Spinola, Prince of Molfetta and Pellina Spinola. Spinola was a member of the House of Spinola, a powerful and wealthy family from the Republic of Genoa. The marriage produced seven children in just 10 years, many had further progeny. Through his son Louis he is a direct ancestor of the reigning Albert II of Monaco and through his youngest daughter he is an ancestor of the pretending Carlos, Duke of Parma, Crown Princess Margareta of Romania, Archduke Karl of Austria, Franz, Duke of Bavaria, former king Simeon II of Bulgaria and reigning Henri, Grand Duke of Luxembourg.

=== Issue ===
1. Louis Grimaldi (25 July 1642 – 3 January 1701), Prince of Monaco as Louis I (1660–1701); married Catherine Charlotte de Gramont
2. Ippolita Maria Grimaldi (8 May 1644 – 8 October 1694) married Carlo Emanuele Filiberto de Simiane, Prince of Montafia and had issue.
3. Giovanna Maria Grimaldi (born 4 June 1645) married Andrea Imperiali, Prince of Francavilla and had issue.
4. Dévote-Marie-Renée Grimaldi (born 1646)
5. Luc-François-Marie-Charles Grimaldi, says "The Little Knight" in 1648 (born 1648)
6. Maria Teresa Grimaldi (4 September 1650 – 20 July 1723) married Sigismondo III d'Este, Marquis of San Martino and had issue.
7. Maria Pelline Grimaldi (born 1651)

== Sources ==
- de Bernardy, Françoise (1960). Histoire des princes de Monaco: De Rainier Ier à Rainier III (in French). Librairie Plon.
