= Battle of Santa Vittoria =

Battle in War of the Spanish Succession

- Part of the War of the Spanish Succession
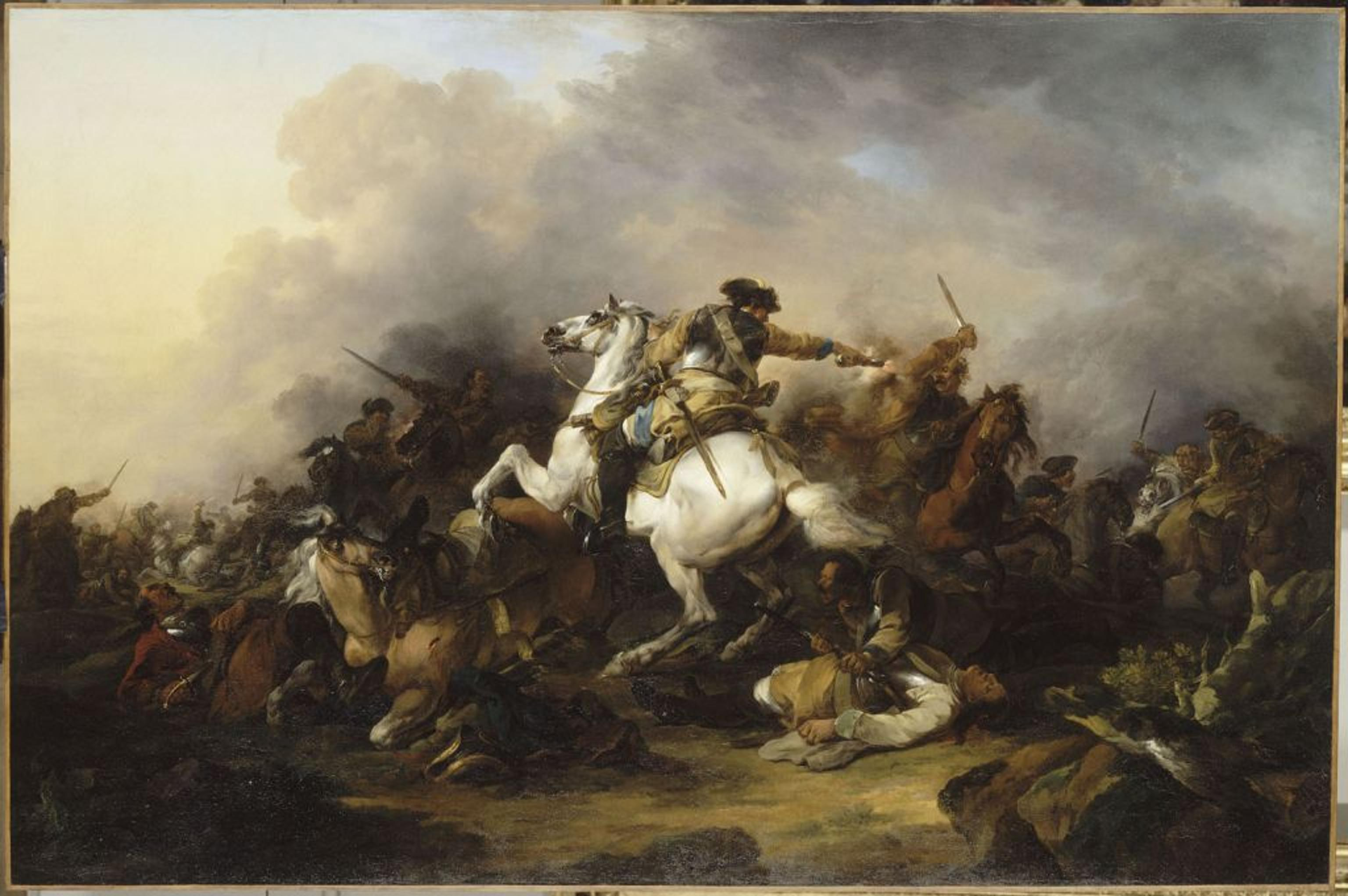
Date	26 July 1702
Location	Santa Vittoria, Commune of Gualtieri (present-day Italy); 44°51′N 10°38′E
Result	French victory

Belligerents
Holy Roman Empire	Kingdom of France; Savoy

Commanders and leaders
Annibal Visconti	Duc de Vendôme

Strength
2,800	4,000

Casualties and losses
600 killed or wounded 400 captured	200

The Battle of Santa Vittoria was an encounter battle or skirmish in the Italian region of Emilia-Romagna on 26 July 1702 during the War of the Spanish Succession between a French force under Louis Joseph, duc de Vendôme and an Imperial (Note: 'Imperial' refers to the Holy Roman Empire, of which Austria was a part but the terms are often used interchangeably.) cavalry detachment under General Annibal Visconti.

Province of Lombardy in yellow; key locations
Province of Emilia-Romagna in yellow; key locations

== Prelude ==
Control of the Duchies of Milan and Mantua was the main strategic prize in Northern Italy as they were key to the security of Austria's southern border. In February 1701, both accepted French garrisons with Victor Amadeus II, Duke of Savoy also signing an alliance with France in April. In May, an Austrian army under Prince Eugene of Savoy (Note: His title was unconnected to the Duchy of Savoy.) entered Northern Italy and won a series of victories which by February 1702 forced the French behind the Adda river.

Shortages of money, men and supplies meant Prince Eugene was unable to take full advantage of this success; he imposed a blockade on Mantua, hoping to starve it into surrender rather than taking it by assault. In early March Vendôme assumed command from Villeroi, captured at Cremona in February; with his army substantially reinforced, Vendôme embarked on a series of marches and counter marches to relieve Mantua.

Although Vendôme escorted a resupply convoy into Mantua, Eugene continued the blockade, basing himself behind fortified positions or la fossa Montanara near Borgoforte and a number of bloody skirmishes took place. In June, Vendôme was joined at Cremona by the new Bourbon King of Spain Philip V; the two split their forces, Philip besieging Imperial-held towns, (Note: Always conscious of the importance of prestige, his grandfather Louis XIV was anxious for Philip to win some easy victories.) hoping to entice Eugene away from Mantua while Vendôme tracked him looking for an opportunity to attack.

In early July, Vendôme reached the village of Sissa with Philip based further south at Castelvetro di Modena and the two armies then linked up at Castelnuovo. Assuming they were advancing on Guastalla, Eugene detached three cavalry regiments under General Visconti to observe the French movements and on the evening of 23 July, they camped at the small village of Santa Vittoria, near modern day Gualtieri.

== Battle ==
Hearing news of Visconti's presence at Santa Vittoria, Vendôme assembled a force composed of 20 squadrons of cavalry and 24 companies of infantry. Since the nominal strength of a French squadron was 135 with 50 in an infantry company, this indicates a maximum of 2,700 cavalry and 1,200 infantry. He was successful in achieving surprise, his cavalry arriving late in the morning of 26 July when most of the Imperialist horse were grazing and the French cut off their retreat by seizing the bridge over the River Crostolo. The Imperialists quickly pulled themselves together and a fierce contest took place as they tried to break out until the French infantry came up and Visconti was forced to withdraw. The Imperialists lost most of their baggage but the sources are unclear as to the number of casualties, one estimate being 1,000 Imperialists versus 200 French but this seems very high.

== Aftermath ==
The French followed up by capturing Guastalla, then Borgoforte, forcing Prince Eugene away from Mantua and led to the Battle of Luzzara on 15 August.
