= Maria Teresa of Monaco =

- Mademoiselle de Carladès

Marquise Consort of San Martino
- Tenure: 18 November 1671 – 20 July 1723
- Born: Maria Teresa Grimaldi; 19 February 1650; Monaco
- Died: 20 July 1723 (aged 73); San Martino in Rio
- Spouse: Sigismund III d'Este (m. 1671)
- Issue: Francesco Filippo; Matilde Aurelia Maria; Maria Anna; Margherita; Contardo; Carlo Filiberto; Alfonso; Aurelia
Names
- French: Marie Thérèse
- House: Grimaldi (by birth); Este of San Martino (by marriage)
- Father: Ercole, Marquis of Baux
- Mother: Maria Aurelia Spinola

Maria Teresa of Monaco (French: Marie Thérèse;19 February 1650 – 20 July 1723) was a Monégasque princess as the sixth child and fourth daughter of Ercole, Marquis of Baux and his wife Maria Aurelia Spinola.

== Biography ==
Maria Teresa Grimaldi was born on February 19, 1650, she was the sixth child and fourth daughter of Ercole, Marquis of Baux and his wife Maria Aurelia Spinola, she was known in Monaco as Mademoiselle de Carladès.

On November 18, 1671, she married Sigismondo III d'Este. The couple had 7 children:

1. Francis Philip
2. Matilda
3. Maria Anna Margherita
4. Contardo
5. Carlo Filiberto
6. Alfonso
7. Aurelia

Maria Teresa died on July 20, 1723, at the age of 73 in San Martino in Rio. She was buried in the Collegiate Church of Saints Martino and Venerio.

== Ancestry ==
Ancestors of Maria Teresa of Monaco

16. Honoré I, Lord of Monaco
8. Ercole, Lord of Monaco
17. Isabella Grimaldi
4. Honoré II, Prince of Monaco
18. Claudio Landi
9. Maria Landi
19. Juana Fernández de Córdoba y Milá de Aragón
2. Ercole Grimaldi
20. Gian Giacomo Teodoro Trivulzio
10. Carlo Emanuele Teodoro Trivulzio
21. Ottavia Marliani
5. Ippolita Trivulzio
22. Alfonso Gonzaga
11. Caterina Gonzaga
23. Ippolita Maggi
1. Maria Teresa di Monaco
24. Goffredo Spinola
12. Gaspare Spinola
25. Maria Grimaldi
6. Luca Spinola
26. Nicolò Doria
13. Maria Doria
27. Aurelia Grimaldi
3. Aurelia Spinola
28. Giovanni Maria Spinola
14. Giovanni Battista Spinola
29. Pellina Lercari
7. Pellina Spinola
30. Filippo Spinola
15. Maria Spinola
31. Polissena Grimaldi

== Sources ==
- D'Onofrio, Mario (1996). Da Francesco Grimaldi a Ranieri III. Il Principato di Monaco: Settecento anni di storia (1297-1997) (in Italian). Fratelli Palombi Editori. p. 193. ISBN 978-8876213649.
- Cottafavi, Clinio (1885). S. Martino in Rio: ricerche storiche (dal 1050 al 1859) (in Italian). Atesa Editrice.
