= Camillo Cybo =

Italian cardinal

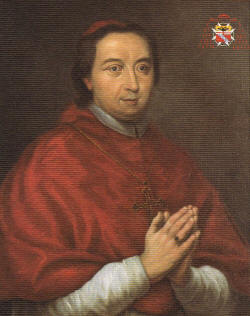
Camillo Cybo in 1729 after he was elevated to Cardinal

Camillo Cybo Malaspina (April 25, 1681 in Massa Carrara – January 12, 1743 in Rome) was an Italian cardinal of the Catholic Church.

== Early life ==
Born into the aristocratic Cybo Malaspina family, he was the son of Carlo II Cybo, duke of Massa, who was a descendant of Pope Innocent VIII and Teresa Pamfili. Cybo was great grand nephew of Pope Innocent X, and nephew of Cardinal Benedetto Pamphili.

== Ecclesiastical career ==
Styles of Camillo Cybo
- Reference style: His Eminence
- Spoken style: Your Eminence
- Religious style: Cardinal
- Posthumous style: none
- Informal style: Cardinal
- See: Patriarchy of Constantinople

- 1705 — Ordained as Priest
- 1718 — Appointed as Titular Patriarch of Constantinople. He was ordained Bishop that same year, and named Auditor general of the Apostolic Chamber.
- 1729 — Elevated to Cardinal Santo Stefano al Monte Celio in the Consistory of March 23, under Benedict XIII.
- 1731 — Appointed Cardinal-Priest of Santa Maria del Popolo
- 1741 — Appointed Protector of Santa Maria degli Angeli

== Patronage of the arts ==
As many important figures of the time, Cybo was a patron of the arts. One of his proteges was Pietro Locatelli, who dedicated his Concerti Grossi Op 1 to him in 1721.

== Bibliography ==
- Williams, George L. (2004). Papal Genealogy: The Families And Descendants Of The Popes. McFarland. ISBN 9780786420711.
- Mac Veigh, Simon; Hirshberg, Jehoash (2004). The Italian Solo Concerto, 1700–1760: Rhetorical Strategies and Style History. Boydell Press. ISBN 9781843830924.
