= Duchy of Modena and Reggio =

Duchy in Northwestern Italy from 1492-1796 and 1814-1859

Duchy of Modena and Reggio: Ducato di Modena e Reggio (Italian); Duchêt ed Mòdna e Rèz (Emilian); Ducatus Mutinae et Regii (Latin)
- 1452–1796; 1814–1859
- Top: Flag (1452–1830); Bottom: Flag (1830–1859) Coat of arms under the House of Austria-Este (1830–1859)
- Motto: Dextera Domini exaltavit me (Latin for 'The right hand of the Lord ‘has’ exalted me')
- Anthem: Gott erhalte Franz den Kaiser (From 1815) "God Save Emperor Francis" Royal anthem "Popular Hymn" (Prayers to be sung during the Mass and the Blessing of the Blessed Sacrament by the Este's troops)
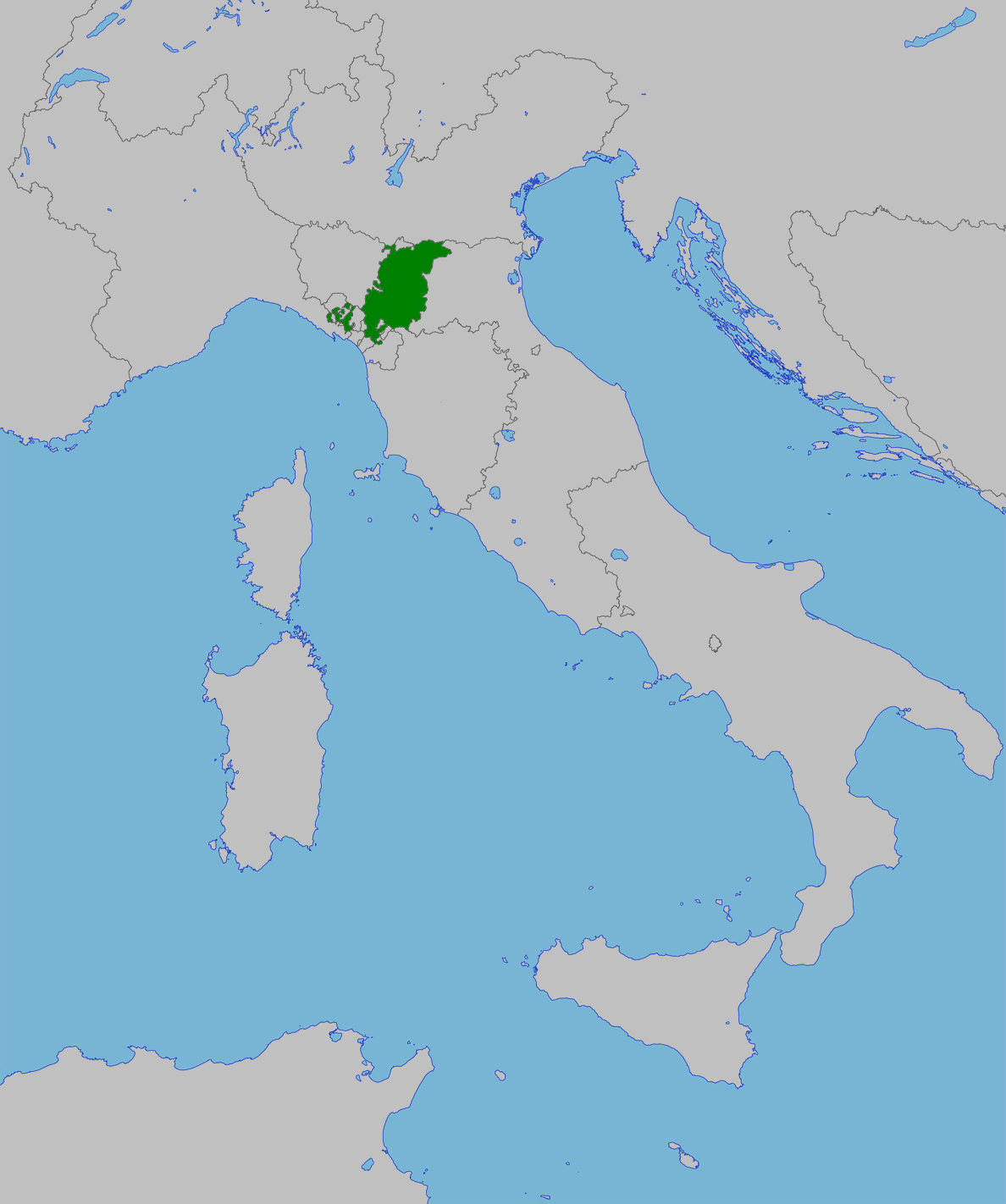
- The Duchy of Modena and Reggio in 1815

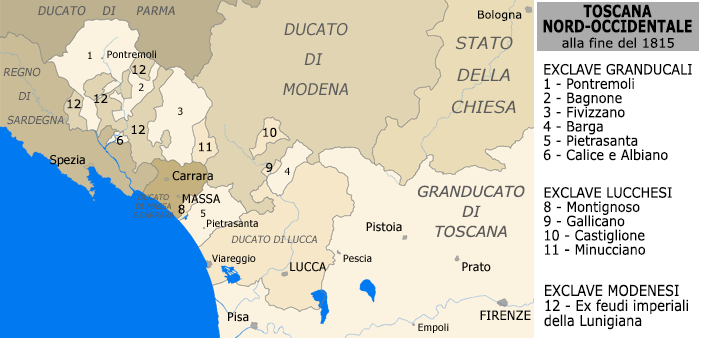
- The intricate southern border area of the Duchy at the end of 1815, following the acquisition of the former imperial fiefdoms of Lunigiana.
- Capital: Modena
- Common languages: Latin (until 17th century); Italian (from 18th century); Emilian
- Religion: Roman Catholicism
- Government: Duchy
- Duke
  - 1452–1471: Borso d'Este (first)
  - 1846–1859: Francesco V (last)
- Historical era: Early modern era
  - Created: 1452
  - Conquered by France: 1796
  - Re-established: 1814
  - Merged to form the United Provinces of Central Italy: 1859

Population
  - 1846 estimate: 238,000
Preceded by
Kingdom of Italy (HRE)
Duchy of Mirandola
County of Novellara and Bagnolo
Duchy of Ferrara
Kingdom of Italy (Napoleonic)
Duchy of Massa and Carrara
Marquisate of Fosdinovo
Duchy of Guastalla
Cispadane Republic
Succeeded by
Cispadane Republic
United Provinces of Central Italy
- Today part of: Italy

The Duchy of Modena and Reggio (Italian: Ducato di Modena e Reggio; Emilian: Duchêt ed Mòdna e Rèz; Latin: Ducatus Mutinae et Regii) was an Italian state created in 1452 located in Northwestern Italy, in the present-day region of Emilia-Romagna. It was ruled since its establishment by the noble House of Este, and from 1814 by the Austria-Este branch of the family. The Este dynasty was a great sponsor of the arts, making the Duchy a cultural reference during the Renaissance and Baroque periods.

== House of Este ==
In 1452 Holy Roman Emperor Frederick III offered the duchy to Borso d'Este, whose family had ruled the city of Modena and nearby Reggio Emilia for centuries. Borso in 1450 had also succeeded his brother as margrave in the adjacent Papal Duchy of Ferrara, where he received the ducal title in 1471. The Este lands on the southern border of the Holy Roman Empire with the Papal States formed a stabilizing buffer state in the interest of both.

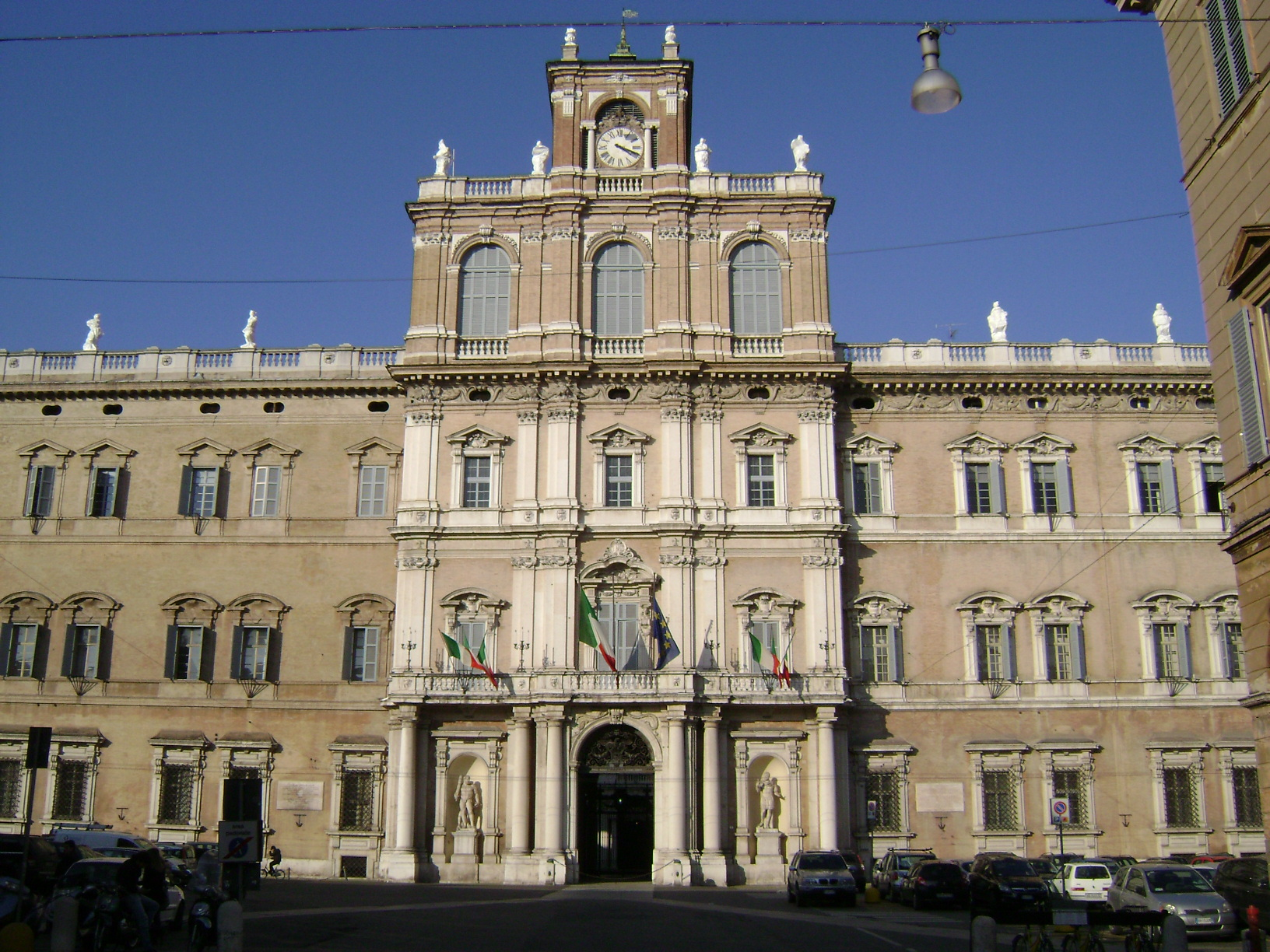
Ducal Palace of Modena

The first Este dukes ruled well and the city achieved an economic and cultural peak: Borso's successor Duke Ercole I had the city of Modena rebuilt according to plans designed by Biagio Rossetti, his successors were patrons of artists like Titian and Ludovico Ariosto. In the War of the League of Cambrai from 1508, troops from Modena fought in Papal service against the Republic of Venice. Upon the death of Duke Alfonso II in 1597, the ducal line became extinct. The Este lands were bequeathed to Alfonso's cousin Cesare d'Este; however, the succession was not acknowledged by Pope Clement VIII and Ferrara was finally seized by the Papacy. Cesare was able to retain Modena and Reggio as Imperial fiefs.

In the 1628 War of the Mantuan Succession, the dukes of Modena sided with Habsburg Spain and in turn received the town of Correggio from the hands of Emperor Ferdinand II. During the War of the Spanish Succession, Duke Rinaldo was ousted by French troops under Louis Joseph, Duke of Vendôme, he could not return until 1707. In 1711 the small Duchy of Mirandola was absorbed by the Este. His successor Francesco III backed France in the 1740 War of the Austrian Succession and was expelled by Habsburg forces, but his duchy was restored by the 1748 Treaty of Aix-la-Chapelle.

In 1796 Modena was again occupied by a French army under Napoleon, who deposed Duke Ercole III and created the Cispadane Republic out of his territory. By the 1801 Treaty of Lunéville, the last Este Duke was compensated with the Breisgau region of the former Further Austrian territories in southwestern Germany, and died in 1803. Following his death, the claims to the no longer existing ducal crown of Modena were inherited by his son-in-law, the Habsburg-Lorraine Archduke Ferdinand of Austria, an uncle of Emperor Francis II.

== House of Austria-Este ==
With the dissolution of the Napoleonic Kingdom of Italy in 1814, following the final fall of Emperor Napoleon I after the Battle of Waterloo, Ferdinand's son, Francis IV, assumed the rule as Duke of Modena. In December 1815 he obtained the transfer from his mother Maria Beatrice d'Este of the former imperial fiefs in Lunigiana, not reconstituted by the Congress of Vienna and bestowed upon her. On her death in 1829, he also inherited the Duchy of Massa and Carrara, which she had in turn received from her mother Maria Teresa Cybo-Malaspina, since Salic Law was derogated there by special imperial investiture.

In the course of the Italian unification period in the 1830s-60s, the "Austria-Este" dukes were briefly ousted in the revolutions of 1831 and 1848, but soon returned.

During the Second Italian War of Independence (April to July 1859) following the Battle of Magenta, the last Duke Francis V was again forced to flee, this time permanently. In December, Modena joined with Tuscany and Parma to form the "United Provinces of Central Italy", which were annexed to the growing Kingdom of Sardinia in March 1860, which led the Italian unification movement, which further led to the proclamation of the Kingdom of Italy in 1861.

== Provinces of the Duchy before the dissolution ==
- Modena (Duchy of Modena)
- Reggio (Duchy of Reggio)
- Guastalla
- Frignano
- Garfagnana
- Lunigiana
- Massa and Carrara (Duchy of Massa and Carrara)

== Traditional titles ==
The Duke of Modena was:

- Duke of Modena (Lord 1288, Duke 1452) and Reggio (nell'Emilia) (Lord 1289, Duke 1452)
- Duke of Ferrara (Lord 1264, Duke 1471–1597)
- Duke of La Mirandola (1710), Massa (1829) and Guastalla (1847)
- Prince of the Holy Roman Empire, Prince of Carpi (Count 1530, Prince 1535), Correggio (1635), San Martino in Rio (1752) and of Carrara (1829),
- Marquis of Montecchio (1597, marquessate in 1569), of Scandiano (1645) and La Concordia (1710)
- Count palatine of Novellara (1737) and Bagnolo (1737),
- Count of Jeno ed Avad (Hungary, 1726)
- Lord of Sassuolo (1373), San Martino in Spino (1710), Campogalliano (1752), Castellarano (1752), Rodeglia (1752), Ieno and San Cassiano

== Knighthood orders ==
The Duke of Modena, since Francis V, was Grand Master of the :

- Order of the Eagle of Este
- Order of Seniority of Service (it)

== Historical flags and coat of arms ==
Before 1830

State flag (1452–1830)

Coat of arms (1452–1830)
After 1830

Civil flag and Civil ensign 1830–1859

State flag 1830–1859

1830–1859

== See also ==
- Duke of Ferrara and of Modena
- Historical states of Italy
- Duchy of Ferrara
