= Ercole III d'Este =

Duke of Modena and Reggio from 1780 to 1796

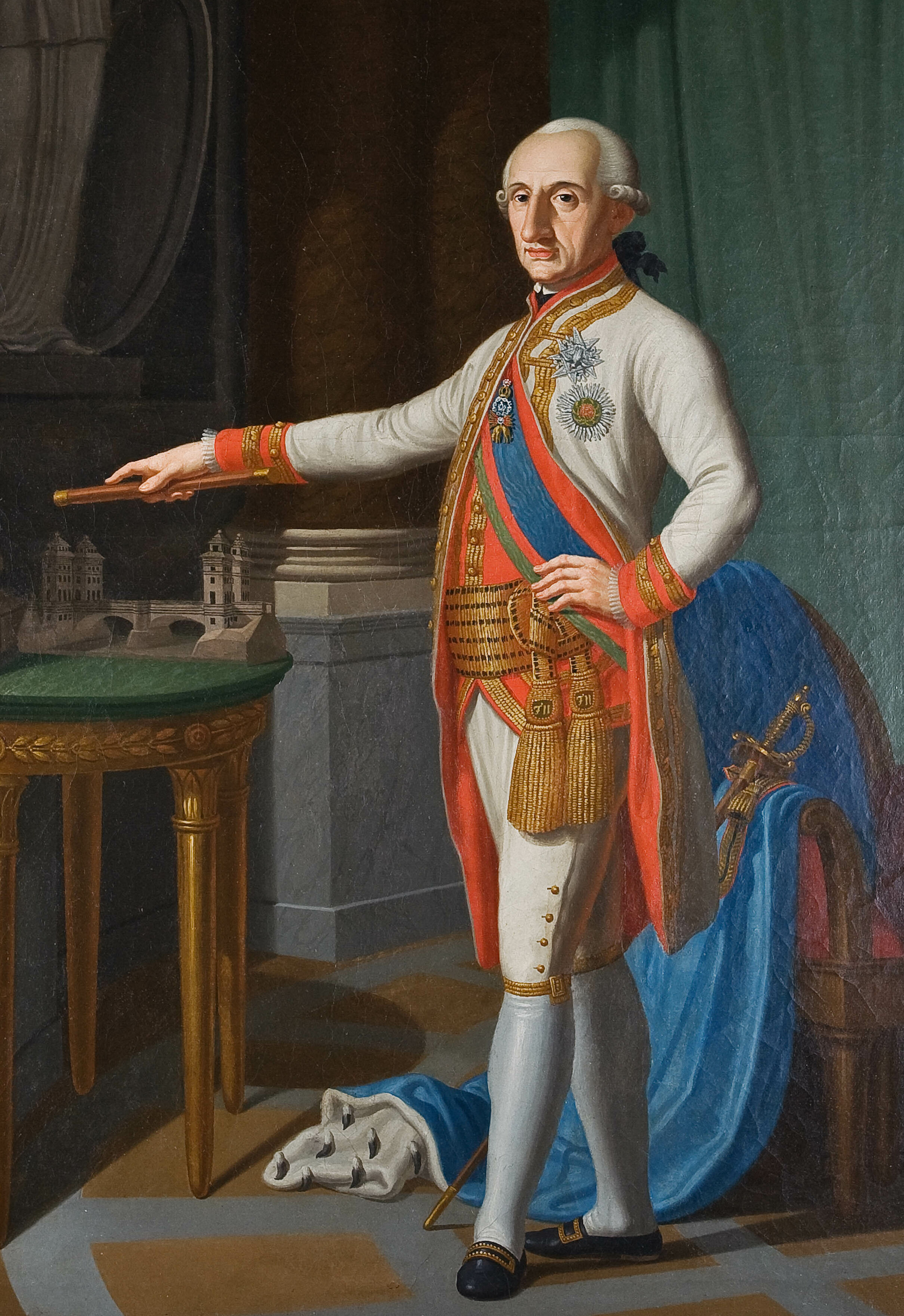
- Portrait by Giuseppe Maria Soli, c. 1793

Duke of Modena and Reggio
- Reign: 22 February 1780 – 7 May 1796
- Predecessor: Francesco III d'Este
- Successor: Position abolished until 1814; Francis IV, Duke of Modena (House of Habsburg-Este)
- Born: 22 November 1727; Ducal Palace, Duchy of Modena and Reggio
- Died: 14 October 1803 (aged 75); Treviso, Duchy of Venice
- Spouse: Maria Teresa Cybo-Malaspina, Duchess of Massa (m. 1741; died 1790)
- Issue Detail: Maria Beatrice, Duchess of Massa
Names
- Ercole Rinaldo d'Este
- House: Este
- Father: Francesco III d'Este, Duke of Modena
- Mother: Charlotte Aglaé d'Orléans
- Religion: Roman Catholicism

Ercole III d'Este (Ercole Rinaldo; 22 November 1727 – 14 October 1803) was Duke of Modena and Reggio from 1780 to 1796, and later of Breisgau (not resident). He was a member of the House of Este.

== Biography ==
Ercole was born in Modena, the son of Duke Francesco III d'Este, Duke of Modena and Charlotte Aglaé d'Orléans, daughter of Philippe d'Orléans, Duke of Orléans and Regent of France. He was the couple's fourth child and had an older sister Maria Teresa and two brothers who died before his birth.

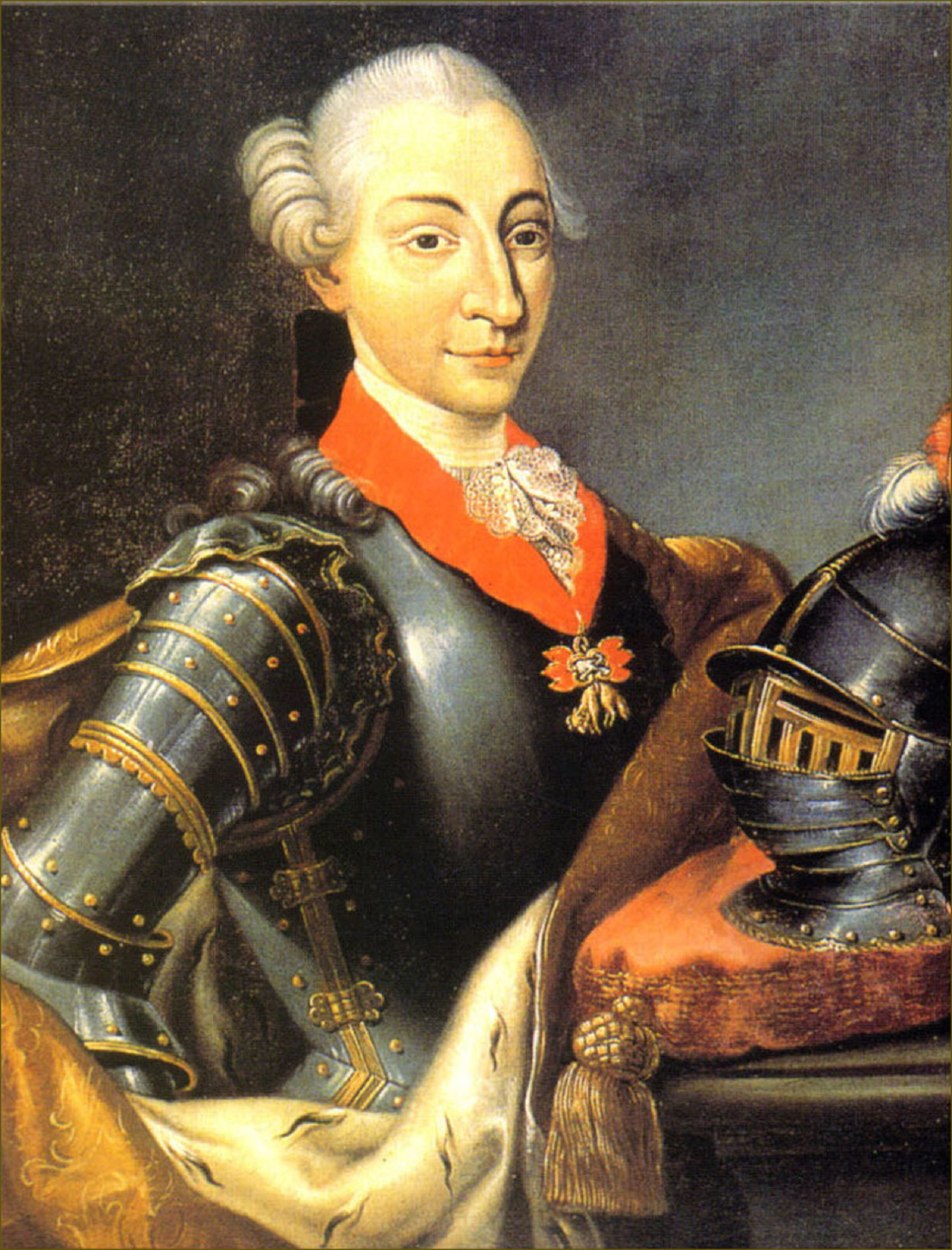
Ercole III d’Este, Duke of Modena.

In 1741, he married Maria Teresa Cybo-Malaspina, sovereign of the Duchy of Massa and Carrara: their relations turned out to be extremely unhappy and the Duchess lived for most of the time in Reggio, separated from her husband. When his parents succeeded as rulers of Modena, he was styled His Royal Highness the Hereditary Prince of Modena (1737–1780) and after his father's death in 1780, His Royal Highness the Duke of Modena.

Generally appreciated by his subjects (he sometimes spoke in Modenese dialect with them), Ercole continued the reform begun by his father. He built the two bridges at Rubiera and St. Ambrogio at Modena on the Via Emilia, and built new roads connecting to the neighbouring states. In 1785 he founded the Atesine Academy of Fine Arts: during his reign arts and culture flourished, and among his protégées were Lazzaro Spallanzani, Giambattista Venturi, Girolamo Tiraboschi, Lodovico Ricci and others.

After the death of his wife in 1790, he married morganatically in 1795 with his long-time mistress Chiara Marini (d. Treviso, 1800), whom he invested with title of Marchioness of Scandiano (only formally, without any authentic rule over this land).

The French invasion forced him to flee to Venice on 7 May 1796, carrying with him a conspicuous personal asset. Later French soldiers captured him at Venice, robbing 200,000 zecchini from his house. After this episode he moved to Treviso, where he died in 1803. The peaces of Treaty of Campo Formio (1797) and Lunéville had assigned him territories in Breisgau in exchange of the lost duchy; however he never personally took possession of them, but only in March 1803 through the governor appointed by his son-in-law, Archduke Ferdinand of Austria-Este, who was his legal heir and charged with acting as his deputy.

Since his only surviving legitimate daughter Maria Beatrice was not entitled to succeed him due to Salic Law, and since his son-in-law had already died, at the end of the Napoleonic era in 1814, the throne of the restored Duchy of Modena was attributed to his grandson Francis IV of Austria-Este. Archduke Ferdinand had already been forced to cede the Duchy of Modena-Breisgau to the Grand Duchy of Baden in 1805.

== Issue ==
1. Maria Beatrice d'Este (7 April 1750 – 14 November 1829), married Archduke Ferdinand of Austria and had issue.
2. Rinaldo Francesco d'Este (4 January 1753 – 5 May 1753), died in infancy.
3. Ercole Rinaldo (1770 – 16 February 1795), created Marquess of Scandiano in 1787, General in the Modena Army (died illegitimate, before the marriage of his parents).

== Sources ==
- Landi, Andrea (2006). "La grande storia in una piccola terra. Profili giuridici della Restaurazione nel Ducato di Massa e Carrara". Quaderni fiorentini per la storia del pensiero giuridico moderno (in Italian). Vol. 35. pp. 143–224. ISBN 978-88-14-13169-1.
- Williams, George L. (2004). Papal Genealogy: The Families and Descendants of the Popes. McFarland, Inc. ISBN 9780786420711.

Ercole III d'Este House of Este Born: 22 November 1727 Died: 14 October 1803
Regnal titles
Preceded by Francesco III	Duke of Modena and Reggio; 1780–1796	Succeeded by Francis IV
