= San Martino in Rio =

- Comune
- Comune di San Martino in Rio
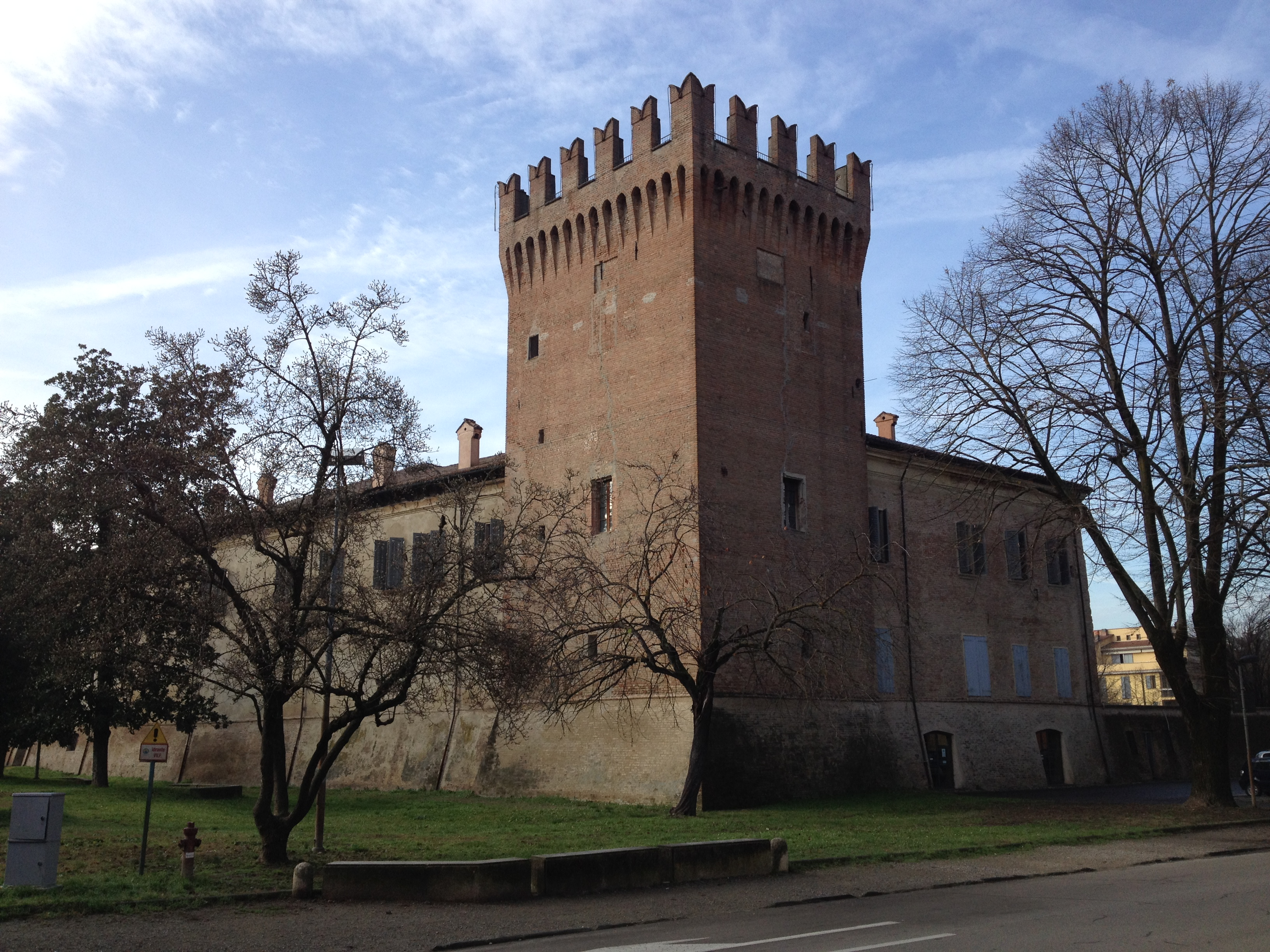
- San Martino in Rio

- Location within Italy Location within Emilia-Romagna
- Coordinates: 44°44′N 10°47′E
- Country: Italy
- Region: Emilia-Romagna
- Province: Reggio Emilia (RE)
- Frazioni: Case Culzoni, Case Vellani, Gazzata, Montecatini, Osteriola, Stiolo, Trignano

Government
  - Mayor: Paolo Fuccio

Area
  - Total: 22.72 km^{2} (8.77 sq mi)
- Elevation: 36 m (118 ft)

Population (31 December 2024)
  - Total: 8,218
  - Density: 361.7/km^{2} (936.8/sq mi)
- Demonym: Sammartinesi
- Time zone: UTC+1 (CET)
  - Summer (DST): UTC+2 (CEST)
- Postal code: 42018
- Dialing code: 0522

San Martino in Rio (Reggiano: Sân Martèin Grand) is a comune (municipality) in the Province of Reggio Emilia in the Italian region Emilia-Romagna, located about 50 kilometres (31 mi) northwest of Bologna and about 12 kilometres (7 mi) northeast of Reggio Emilia. Remarkable the church of San Carlo Borromeo. As of 31 December 2024 San Martino in Rio had an estimated population of 8,218.

San Martino in Rio borders the following municipalities: Campogalliano, Correggio, Reggio Emilia, Rubiera.
