= Prince Karl of Bavaria (1874–1927) =

German general (1874–1927)

Prince Karl
- Born: 1 April 1874; Villa Amsee near Lindau, Bavaria
- Died: 9 May 1927 (aged 53); Munich, Bavaria
- Burial: Liebfrauendom, Munich, Bavaria
- House: Wittelsbach
- Father: Ludwig III of Bavaria
- Mother: Archduchess Maria Theresia of Austria-Este

Prince Karl of Bavaria (German: Karl Maria Luitpold Prinz von Bayern) (1 April 1874 – 9 May 1927) was a member of the Bavarian Royal House of Wittelsbach and a Major General in the Bavarian Army.

== Early life ==
Karl was born at Villa Amsee near Lindau in Bavaria. He was the second son of King Ludwig III of Bavaria and his wife Archduchess Maria Theresia of Austria-Este, member of the Austria-Este branch of the House of Habsburg.

== Military career ==
Like his older brother Crown Prince Rupprecht, Karl joined the Bavarian Army and eventually reached the rank of Major General.

== Personal life ==
He never married and left no known descendants.

== Death ==
Karl died in Munich and is buried in the crypt of the famous Frauenkirche in the Bavarian capital.

== Ancestry ==
Ancestors of Prince Karl of Bavaria (1874–1927)

16. Maximilian I Joseph of Bavaria
8. Ludwig I of Bavaria
17. Princess Augusta Wilhelmine of Hesse-Darmstadt
4. Luitpold, Prince Regent of Bavaria
18. Frederick, Duke of Saxe-Altenburg
9. Princess Therese of Saxe-Hildburghausen
19. Duchess Charlotte Georgine of Mecklenburg-Strelitz
2. Ludwig III of Bavaria
20. Ferdinand III, Grand Duke of Tuscany
10. Leopold II, Grand Duke of Tuscany
21. Princess Luisa of Naples and Sicily
5. Archduchess Auguste Ferdinande of Austria
22. Maximilian, Hereditary Prince of Saxony
11. Princess Maria Anna of Saxony
23. Princess Carolina of Parma
1. Prince Karl of Bavaria
24. Ferdinand, Archduke of Austria-Este
12. Francis IV, Duke of Modena
25. Maria Beatrice d'Este, Duchess of Massa
6. Archduke Ferdinand Karl Viktor of Austria-Este
26. Victor Emmanuel I of Sardinia
13. Princess Maria Beatrice of Savoy
27. Archduchess Maria Theresa of Austria-Este
3. Archduchess Maria Theresa of Austria-Este
28. Leopold II, Holy Roman Emperor
14. Archduke Joseph, Palatine of Hungary
29. Infanta Maria Luisa of Spain
7. Archduchess Elisabeth Franziska of Austria
30. Duke Louis of Württemberg
15. Duchess Maria Dorothea of Württemberg
31. Princess Henriette of Nassau-Weilburg
