= Jacobite consorts =

Jacobite consorts are those who were married to a Jacobite pretender to the thrones of England, Scotland and Ireland since the abdication of James II in 1688. By Jacobites they are thus regarded, if female, as rightful Queens Consort of England, Scotland and Ireland. Since the death of Marie-Jenke, Duchess of Bavaria in 1983, there has been no Jacobite consort; the current pretender, Franz, Duke of Bavaria, is not married.

After 1807, the succession passed from the House of Stuart, and none of the Jacobite heirs since has actually claimed the thrones of England and Scotland or incorporated the arms of England and Scotland in their coats-of-arms.

Portrait	Name	Arms	Father	Birth	Marriage	Became consort	Ceased to be consort	Death	Spouse
	Mary of Modena		Alfonso IV d'Este, Duke of Modena (Este)	5 October 1658	30 September 1673 (by proxy)	6 February 1685 husband's accession 11 December 1688 (England) / 11 May 1689 (Scotland) husband became pretender	16 September 1701 husband's death	7 May 1718	James II & VII
	Maria Clementina Sobieska		James Louis Sobieski (Sobieski)	18 July 1702	3 September 1719		18 January 1735		James III & VIII
	Princess Louise of Stolberg-Gedern		Prince Gustav Adolf of Stolberg-Gedern	20 September 1752	28 March 1772 (by proxy)		31 January 1788 husband's death	29 January 1824	Charles III
	Maria Theresa of Austria-Este; Queen of Sardinia		Ferdinand, Duke of Breisgau (Austria-Este)	1 November 1773	25 April 1789	6 October 1819 husband's accession	10 January 1824 husband's death	29 March 1832	Victor
	Francis IV, Duke of Modena		Ferdinand, Duke of Breisgau (Austria-Este)	6 October 1779	20 June 1812	10 January 1824 wife's accession	15 September 1840 wife's death	21 January 1846	Mary III & II
	Princess Adelgunde of Bavaria; Duchess of Modena		Ludwig I of Bavaria (Wittelsbach)	19 March 1823	20 March 1842		20 November 1875 husband's death	28 January 1914	Francis I
	Ludwig III of Bavaria		Luitpold, Prince Regent of Bavaria (Wittelsbach)	7 January 1845	20 February 1868	20 November 1875 wife's accession	3 February 1919 wife's death	18 October 1921	Mary IV & III
	Princess Antonia of Luxembourg; Crown Princess of Bavaria		William IV, Grand Duke of Luxembourg (Nassau-Weilburg)	7 October 1899	7 April 1921		31 July 1954		Robert I & IV
-	Countess Maria Draskovich of Trakostjan; Duchess of Bavaria		Count Dionys Maria Draskovich of Trakostjan (Drašković)	8 March 1904	3 September 1930	2 August 1955 husband's accession	10 June 1969		Albert
-	Countess Marie-Jenke Keglevich of Buzin; Duchess of Bavaria		Count Stephan Keglevich of Buzin (Keglević of Buzin)	23 April 1921	21 April 1971		5 October 1983		Albert
VACANT

Henry Benedict Stuart (pretender 1788-1807, as Henry IX & I) and Franz, Duke of Bavaria (pretender 1996–present, as Francis II) never married (Henry was a Catholic priest, bishop, and cardinal; Franz is gay and has a male partner). Marie Clotilde of France, wife of Charles Emmanuel IV of Sardinia (pretender 1807-1819, as Charles IV), died before her husband became pretender, as did Duchess Marie Gabrielle in Bavaria, first wife of Rupprecht, Crown Prince of Bavaria (Robert I & IV).

== See also ==
- Jacobite succession
- List of Savoyard consorts
- List of dukes of Modena and Reggio
- List of Modenese consorts
- List of Bavarian monarchs
- List of Bavarian royal consorts
- Family tree showing the ancestry of the Jacobite Pretenders and their relation to the UK monarchs descended from Sophia of Hanover
