= Maria Theresia of Austria-Este =

Maria Theresia of Austria-Este may refer to:

- Maria Theresa of Austria-Este (1773–1832), daughter of Archduke Ferdinand of Austria and Maria Beatrice d'Este; wife of Victor Emmanuel I of Sardinia
- Maria Theresa of Austria-Este (1849–1919), daughter of Archduke Ferdinand of Austria-Este and his wife, Archduchess Elisabeth of Austria; wife of Ludwig III of Bavaria
