= Princess Mathilde of Bavaria =

Mathilde of Bavaria
- Princess Ludwig of Saxe-Coburg and Gotha
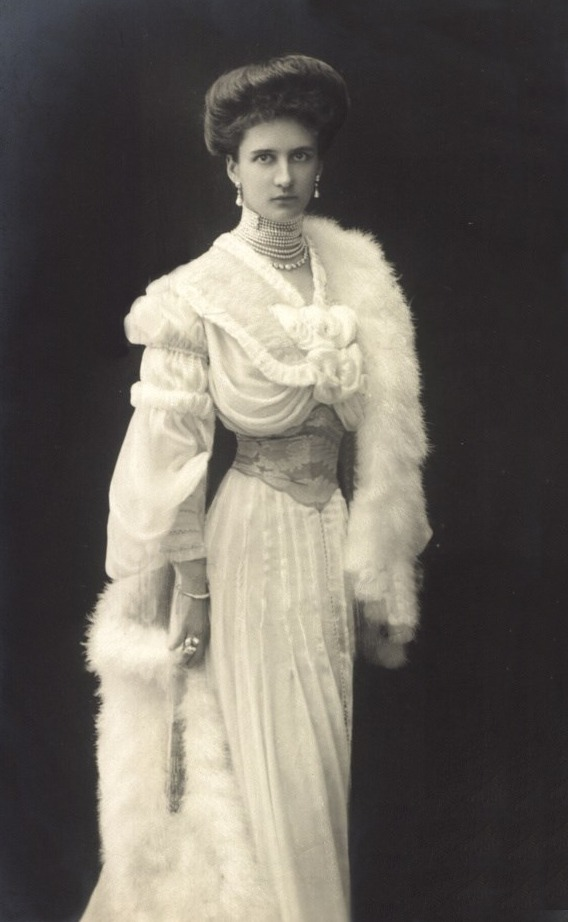
- Mathilde in the 1903
- Born: 17 August 1877; Villa Amsee, Lindau, Kingdom of Bavaria, German Empire
- Died: 6 August 1906 (aged 28); Davos, Switzerland
- Burial: Church of Saints Peter and Paul, Rieden
- Spouse: Prince Ludwig of Saxe-Coburg and Gotha (m. 1900)
- Issue: Prince Antonius Maria Ludwig; Princess Maria Immaculata Leopoldine
Names
- Mathilde Marie Theresia Henriette Christine Luitpolda
- House: Wittelsbach
- Father: Ludwig III of Bavaria
- Mother: Maria Theresa of Austria-Este

Princess Mathilde of Bavaria (Mathilde Marie Theresia Henriette Christine Luitpolda; 17 August 1877 – 6 August 1906) was the sixth child of Ludwig III of Bavaria and Maria Theresa of Austria-Este. After her early death, Life-Dreams: The Poems of a Blighted Life, a collection of poems she wrote, was published in 1910.

== Family and early life ==
Princess Mathilde was born on 17 August 1877 as the sixth child and third daughter of Ludwig III of Bavaria at the family's summer residence of Villa Amsee in Lindau. Though she was the favorite daughter of her father, she and her mother were not close. Some speculate that she only married as an escape from her home.

== Later years ==
=== Marriage and issue ===
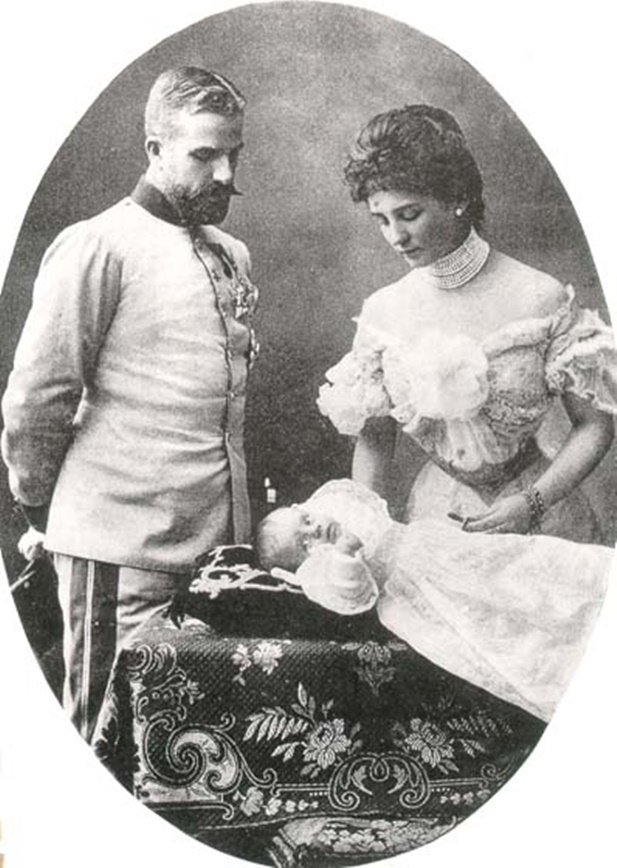
Mathilde and Ludwig with their son

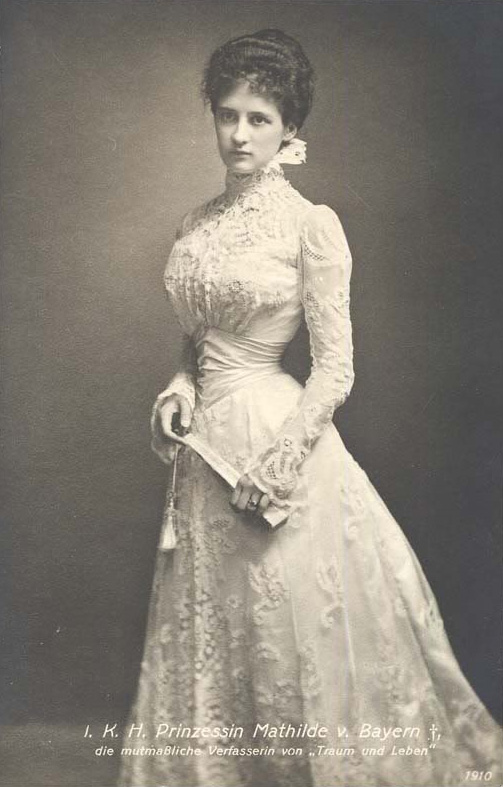
Mathilde of Bavaria - Princess of Saxe-Coburg and Gotha, 1900s

Various candidates were rumored to be engaged to Princess Mathilde at different times. These included, in 1896, the Prince of Naples, but he married Princess Elena of Montenegro later that year. Others included Archduke Franz Ferdinand of Austria, heir to the Austro-Hungarian throne, and Jaime, Duke of Anjou and Madrid.

On 1 May 1900 in Munich, Mathilde married Prince Ludwig of Saxe-Coburg and Gotha, a son of Prince Ludwig August of Saxe-Coburg and Gotha and his wife Princess Leopoldina of Brazil. He was a captain in the Austrian army, and had been raised in Brazil as a grandson of Emperor Pedro II. The prince was also from the Catholic branch of the House of Saxe-Coburg and Gotha. They had two children: Prince Antonius of Saxe-Coburg and Gotha (17 June 1901 – 1 September 1970); and Princess Maria Immaculata of Saxe-Coburg and Gotha (10 September 1904 – 18 March 1940).

=== Death ===
Mathilde died of tuberculosis at the age of 28, on 6 August 1906, in Davos, Switzerland. Her remains are buried in the Church of Saints Peter and Paul in the little village of Rieden near her family home at Schloss Leutstetten. Her husband remarried a year later to Countess Anna of Trauttmansdorff-Weinsberg.

In 1910 Mathilde's family anonymously published some of her poems as Traum und Leben: Gedichte einer früh Vollendeten. In 1913 John Heard translated and published them in English as Life-Dreams: The Poems of a Blighted Life.

== Ancestry ==
Ancestors of Princess Mathilde of Bavaria

8. Ludwig I of Bavaria
4. Luitpold, Prince Regent of Bavaria
9. Princess Therese of Saxe-Hildburghausen
2. Ludwig III of Bavaria
10. Leopold II, Grand Duke of Tuscany
5. Archduchess Auguste Ferdinande of Austria
11. Princess Maria Anna of Saxony
1. Princess Mathilde of Bavaria
12. Francis IV, Duke of Modena
6. Archduke Ferdinand Karl Viktor of Austria-Este
13. Princess Maria Beatrice of Savoy
3. Archduchess Maria Theresa of Austria-Este
14. Archduke Joseph, Palatine of Hungary
7. Archduchess Elisabeth Franziska of Austria
15. Duchess Maria Dorothea of Württemberg
