= Archduchess Maria Theresa of Austria-Este, Countess of Chambord =

Archduchess Maria Theresa
- Duchess of Bordeaux, Countess of Chambord
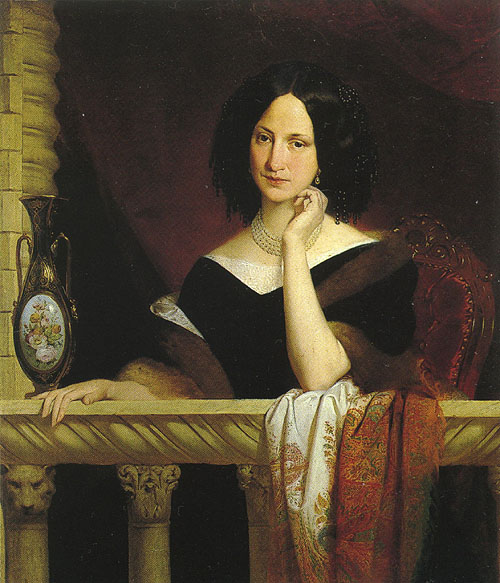

Consort of the Legitimist pretender to the French throne
- Pretence: 7 November 1846 – 24 August 1883
- Born: 14 July 1817; Modena, Duchy of Modena and Reggio
- Died: 25 March 1886 (aged 68); Görz, Austria-Hungary
- Burial: Kostanjevica Monastery, Nova Gorica, Slovenia
- Spouse: Henri, Count of Chambord (m. 1846; died 1883)
Names
- Italian: Maria Teresa Beatrice Gaetana; German: Maria Theresia Beatrix Gaëtane; French: Marie Thérèse Béatrice Gaetan
- House: Habsburg-Este
- Father: Francis IV, Duke of Modena
- Mother: Maria Beatrice of Savoy

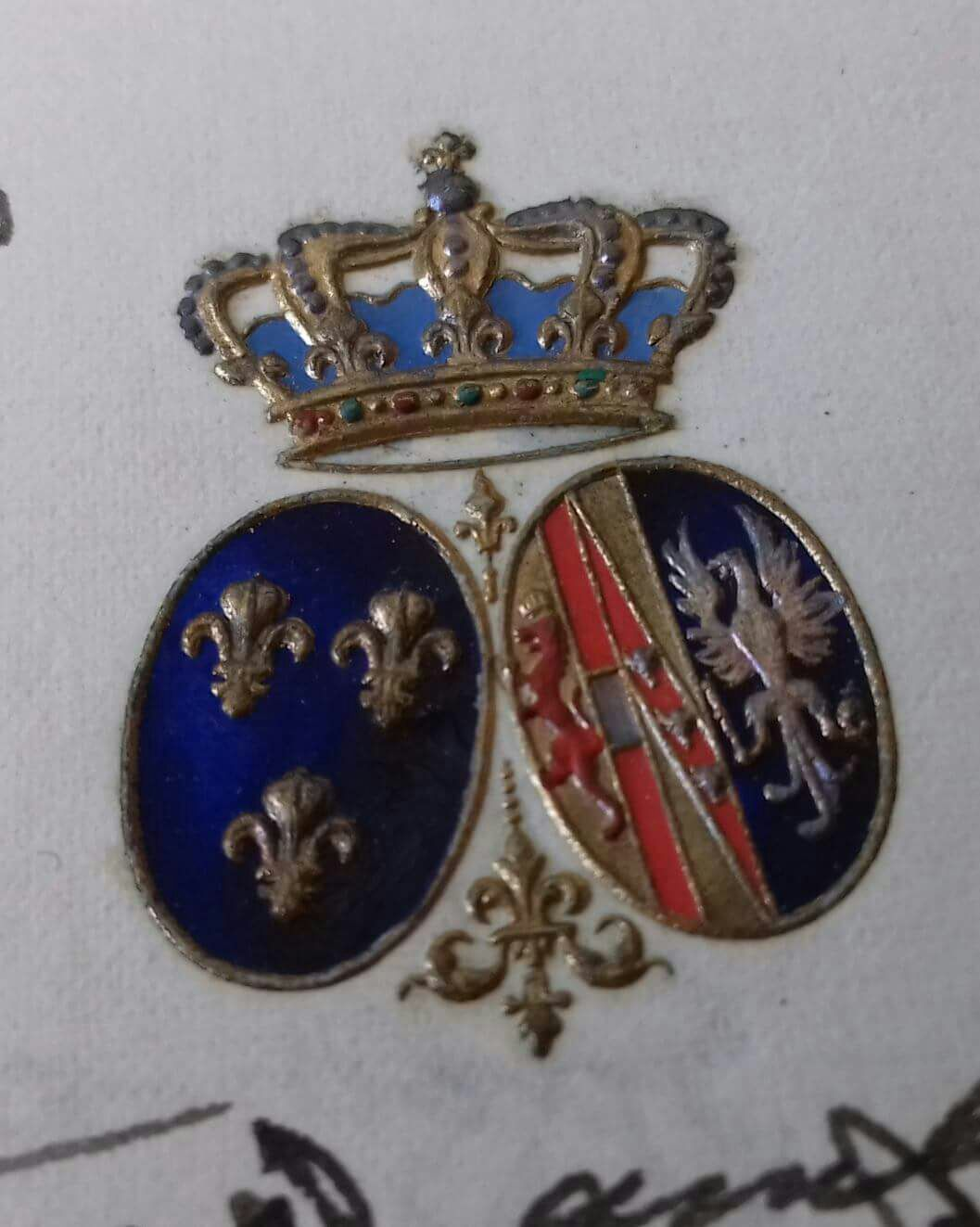
Coats of arms

Archduchess Maria Theresa of Austria-Este (German: Maria Theresia Beatrix Gaëtane, Erzherzogin von Österreich-Este, Prinzessin von Modena) (14 July 1817, Modena, Duchy of Modena and Reggio – 25 March 1886, Görz, Austria-Hungary) was a member of the House of Austria-Este and Archduchess of Austria, Princess of Hungary, Bohemia, and Modena by birth. Her husband, Henri, was disputedly King of France and Navarre from 2 to 9 August 1830 and afterwards the Legitimist pretender to the throne of France from 1844 to 1883. Maria Theresa was the eldest child of Francis IV, Duke of Modena and his niece-wife Maria Beatrice of Savoy.

== Biography ==
Maria Theresa married Henri, comte de Chambord, the posthumous son of Charles Ferdinand, Duke of Berry, younger son of Charles X of France, by his wife, Princess Caroline Ferdinande of Bourbon-Two Sicilies, daughter of Francis I of the Two Sicilies, by proxy on 7 November 1846 in Modena and in person on 16 November 1846 in Bruck an der Mur, Styria. Maria Theresa and Henri produced no children. Maria Theresa had been chosen as Henri's wife by his father’s cousin Marie-Thérèse-Charlotte of France. Marie-Thérèse sought to ally the exiled French Royal Family with the House of Austria-Este for several reasons: it was Roman Catholic and the only royal family not to have recognized the July Monarchy of Louis-Philippe of France. Henri had actually preferred Maria Theresa's youngest sister, Maria Beatrix.

After Henri's death on 24 August 1883, Maria Theresa and a minority of Henri's supporters held that Juan, Count of Montizón, as senior male descendant of Louis XIV, was his successor. Juan's wife was Maria Theresa's sister, Maria Beatrix.

Maria Theresa was instrumental in building a crypt for the French Royal Family at the Church of the Annunciation of Our Lady on Castagnevizza in Görz (now in Nova Gorica, Slovenia). It was her wish that the last of the Bourbons be gathered in one place together within the monastery at Castagnevizza. Three years after the death of her husband Henri, Maria Theresa died on 25 March 1886 in Görz and was interred with her husband in the crypt of the church of Franciscan Monastery of Castagnevizza in Görz.

== Honours ==
- Austria-Hungary : Dame of the Order of the Starry Cross

== Gallery ==
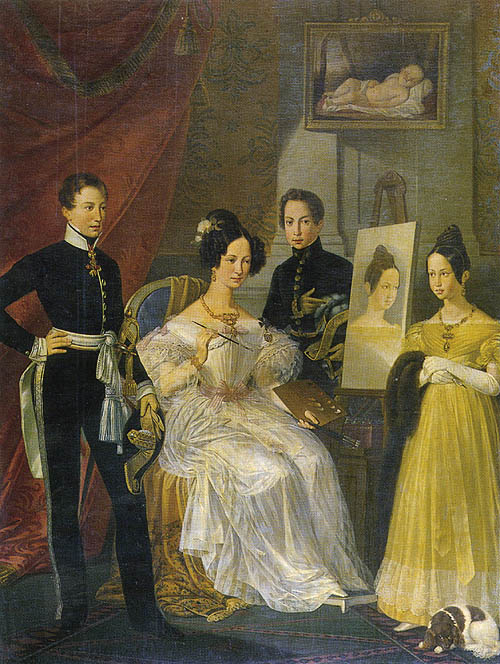
The children of Maria Beatrice of Savoy - Duchess of Modena and Reggio, by Bernardino Rossi, 1836

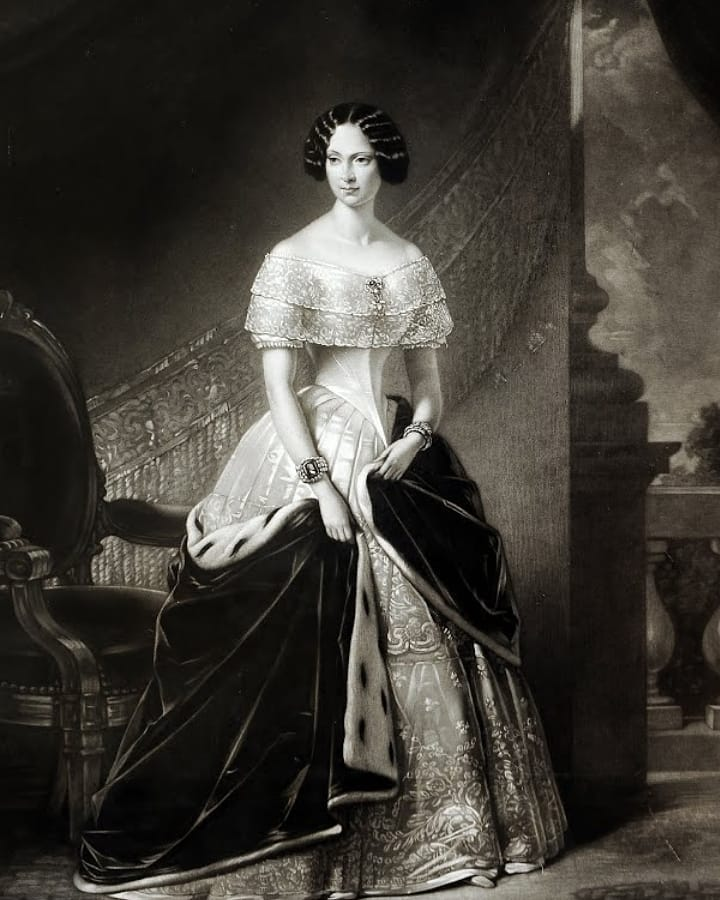
Portrait of the Countess of Chambord, 1846

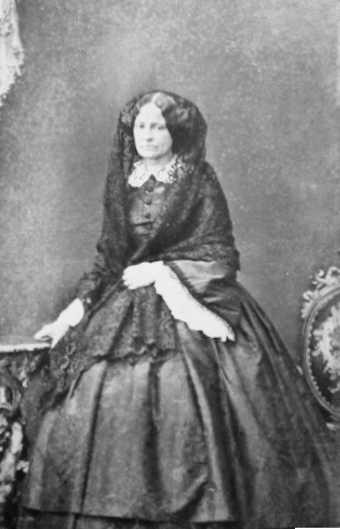
The Countess of Chambord during the last years of her life, 1880s

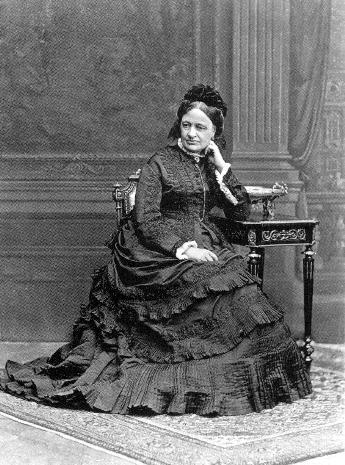
Photograph of Maria Theresa, c. 1885

== Ancestry ==
Ancestors of Archduchess Maria Theresa of Austria-Este, Countess of Chambord

8. Francis I, Holy Roman Emperor
4. Ferdinand Karl, Archduke of Austria-Este
9. Maria Theresa of Austria
2. Francis IV, Duke of Modena
10. Ercole III d'Este, Duke of Modena
5. Maria Beatrice d'Este, Duchess of Massa
11. Maria Teresa Cybo-Malaspina, Duchess of Massa
1. Archduchess Maria Theresa of Austria-Este
12. Victor Amadeus III of Sardinia
6. Victor Emmanuel I of Sardinia
13. Infanta Maria Antonia of Spain
3. Princess Maria Beatrice of Savoy
14. Ferdinand Karl, Archduke of Austria-Este (= 4)
7. Archduchess Maria Theresa of Austria-Este
15. Maria Beatrice d'Este, Duchess of Massa (= 5)

Archduchess Maria Theresa of Austria-Este, Countess of Chambord House of Austria-Este Cadet branch of the House of Habsburg-Lorraine Born: 14 July 1817 Died: 25 March 1886
Titles in pretence
Vacant Title last held by Marie-Thérèse-Charlotte of France	— TITULAR — Queen consort of France; Legitimist; 7 November 1846 – 24 August 1883; Reason for succession failure: July Revolution	Succeeded by Maria Beatrix of Austria-Este or Marie Isabelle of Orléans
