= Adeodato Malatesta =

Italian painter (1806–1891)

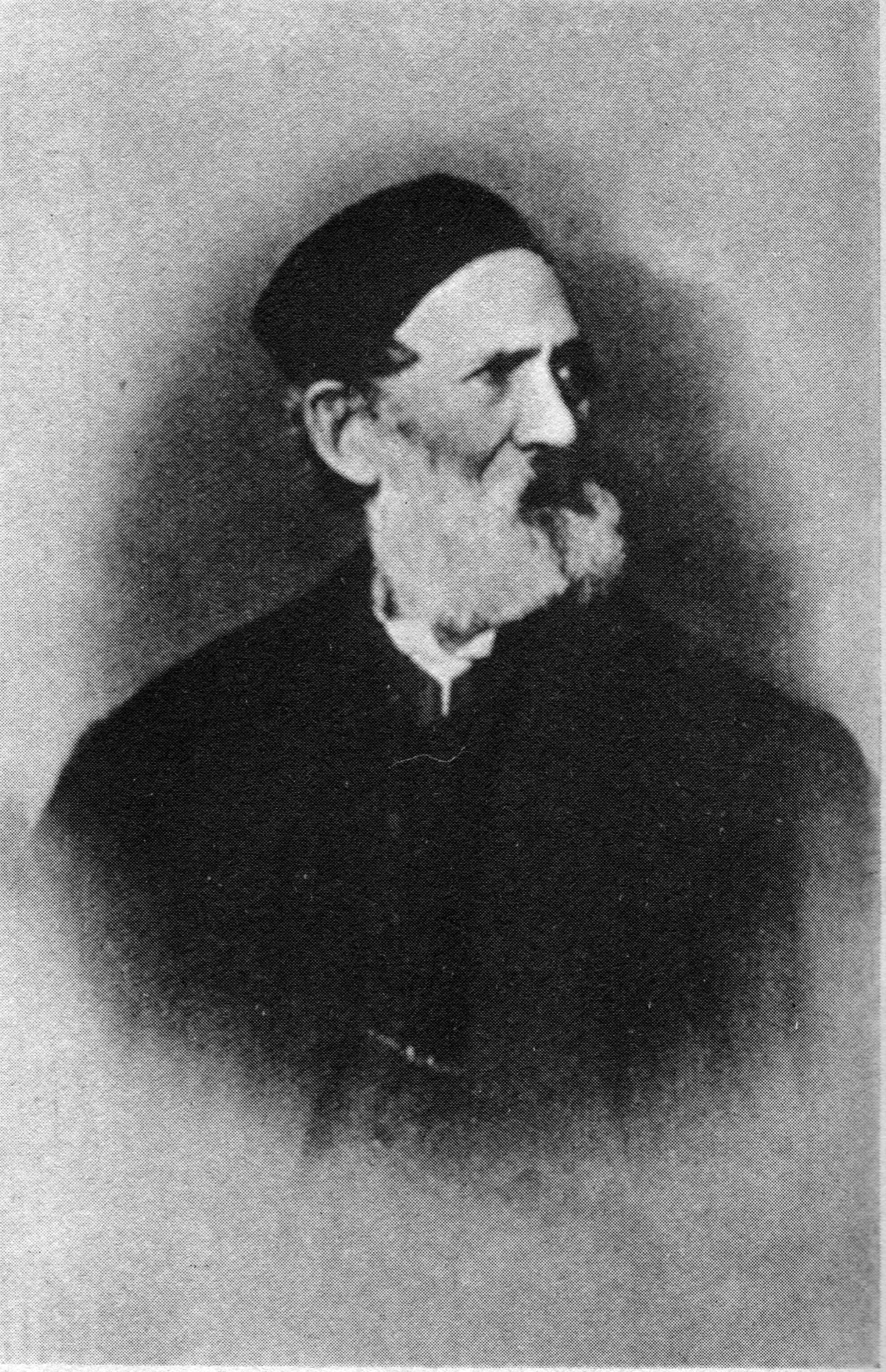
Adeodato Malatesta (1888)

Adeodato Malatesta (May 14, 1806– December 24, 1891) was an Italian painter, trained in a grand Neoclassical style, depicting mostly of sacred and historic subjects.

== Biography ==
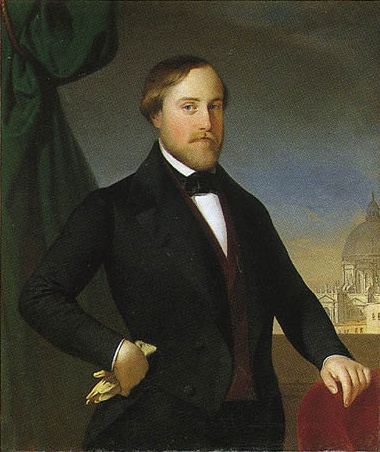
Portrait of Henri, Count of Chambord

Born in Modena, Italy, Malatesta was the third of eleven children of Giuseppe and Carlotta Montessori Malatesta. His father was a captain in the Granducal army of Modena. He spent his childhood in Fiorano, his father's town of origin, where the family had moved.

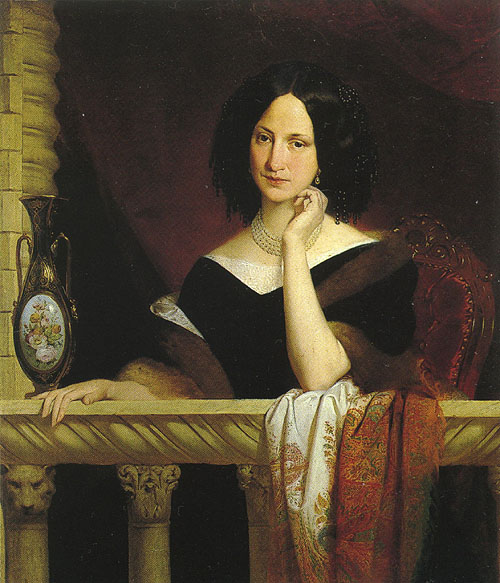
Portrait of Archduchess Maria Theresa of Austria-Este

As his name A deo dato or given to god implies, Adeodato's father had planned a career for the boy in religious orders, but his maternal uncle seeing his disposition to arts, encouraged the young man to enroll in the Royal Academy of Fine Arts of Modena (Accademia Atestina), where the Academy's director, professor Giuseppe Pisani, seeing the young man's skill, obtained for him a stipend to study in Florence under the Neoclassical artists Benvenuti, Bezzuoli, and Bartolini. At Florence, for church of San Francesco di Modena, he painted St Francis receives the stigmata.

Moving to Rome, he painted Miracle of St Francis for a church in province of Massa-Carrara; and the Vestizione di Alfonso d' Este, which was sent to Vienna. His stay in Rome was cut short when his stipend was suspended on the suspicion he held liberal leanings. Encouraged by Pisani, he resumed his studies in Venice, where he moved in 1833 and worked at the Palazzo Papadopoli on the grand canal in Venice, where he painted a St Mark. He was commissioned to paint S. Mauro the Abbot who restores sight to a blind man(1834: Correggio, Civic Museum) for the church of San Sebastiano, Correggio. This was followed by The Baptism of Christ for the Cathedral Basilica of Eger.

In the spring of 1837, Malatesta returned to Modena where he painted an altarpiece depicting St Filomena for the church of Chiesa del Voto. In 1839, he was nominated vice-director and professor at the Accademia of Modena; and later director to succeed Pisani. One of his students was Gaetano Bellei.

He continued to be active, painting the sipario (theater curtain) of the Teatro Comunale. For the contessa Boschetti di Modena he painted two large canvases depicting Abraham banishes Hagar, and the Tobiolo. He painted an oil canvas l'Invalido della grande armata; a Jeremiah cries over the ruins of Jerusalem; a Crucifixion; a Flight to Egypt; and Marriage of the Virgin. These last three canvases are large and populated with many figures. He painted the San Bartolomeo found in Fiumalbo; a portrait of contessa Spalletti, dressed as an Amazon; a St Paul for Concordia in the province of Modena; a Madonna con diversi santi found in the church of the Dominicans in Modena; He completed portraits of Dukes Francesco IV and Francesco V of Modena and the latter's daughter. He also painted a portrait of the Dukes of Chambord, and the first son of the Duke of Parma.

He also painted a large historical canvas, Disfatta di Ezzelino da Romano (The Defeat of Ezzelino III da Romano), that was awarded the main prize at the 1862 Florentine exhibition. Among other works, he painted a St Jerome for the church of Cadecoppi, in Camposanto, province of Modena; an altarpiece of the Madonna enthroned with four saints for the church of Ponzano Bolognese; Agar in the Desert; a Supper at Emmaus for the parish church of Legnago; a Glory of St Joseph for a church of Verona; a Mystical Marriage of St Catherine for the church of San Carlo in Modena; Mysteries of the Passion in eight paintings, half frescoes and half oil canvas for the Collegio di San Carlo of Modena. In the church of San Domenico he painted a fresco for the cupola, depicting a St Dominic, who emerges from heaven, surrounded by angels. He also painted genre works, including: a Frutlivendola; a Servetta, il Pifferaio, and il Buon Augurio. He also designed a statue of Ludovico Antonio Muratori erected in the piazza of his name in Modena.

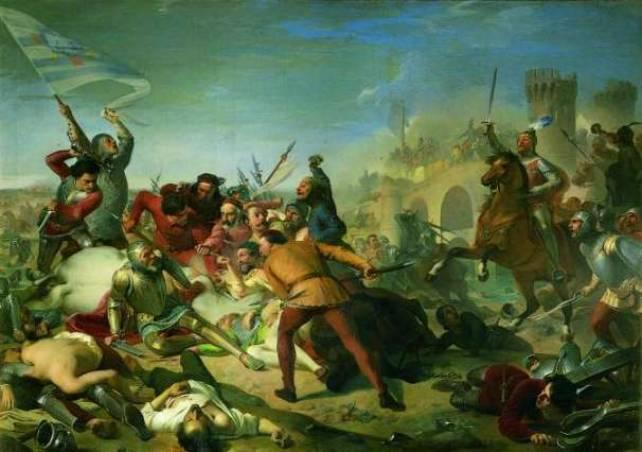
Defeat of Ezzelino II da Romano displayed in the Palazzo Ducale, Modena

In 1877, in addition to the directorship of the Academy, he is named director of the Royal Commission for the care of monuments and works of Art in Emilia. In 1882, he became director of the Galleria Estense of Modena. Malatesta was given honorary membership in many academies of Italy. He was awarded the Croce Estense di San Contado (Order of the Eagle of Este), made an official of the Order of Saints Maurice and Lazarus, and of the Order of the Crown of Italy. He is described by Ashton Rollins Willard as a "stately and courtly gentleman of the old school, with not too high an opinion of his own attainments", active in a provincial center, and notes that the "general character of Malatesta's work and his persistent adherence to figure painting in the historical Italian manner at a time when the general tendency was toward a more naturalistic form of expression, places him in the same group with Podesti and the other historical painters of the middle period" of 19th century.

Adeodato Malatesta died in Modena on December 24, 1891. His son, Narciso, was also a well-known painter. Among his pupils was Antonio Simonazzi.
