= Mathilde of Bavaria =

Mathilde of Bavaria may refer to:

- Princess Mathilde Caroline of Bavaria (1813–1862), daughter of Ludwig I of Bavaria and wife of Louis III, Grand Duke of Hesse
- Princess Mathilde of Bavaria (1877–1906), daughter of Ludwig III of Bavaria and wife of Prince Ludwig Gaston of Saxe-Coburg and Gotha
- Mathilde of Bavaria, Margravine of Meissen (1313–1346), daughter of Louis IV, Holy Roman Emperor and wife of Frederick II, Margrave of Meissen
- Mechthild of Bavaria (1532–1565), daughter of William IV, Duke of Bavaria and wife of Philibert, Margrave of Baden-Baden
- Duchess Mathilde Ludovika in Bavaria (1843–1925) daughter of Duke Maximilian Joseph in Bavaria and wife of Prince Louis, Count of Trani
