= Maria Anna of Savoy =

Empress of Austria from 1835 to 1848

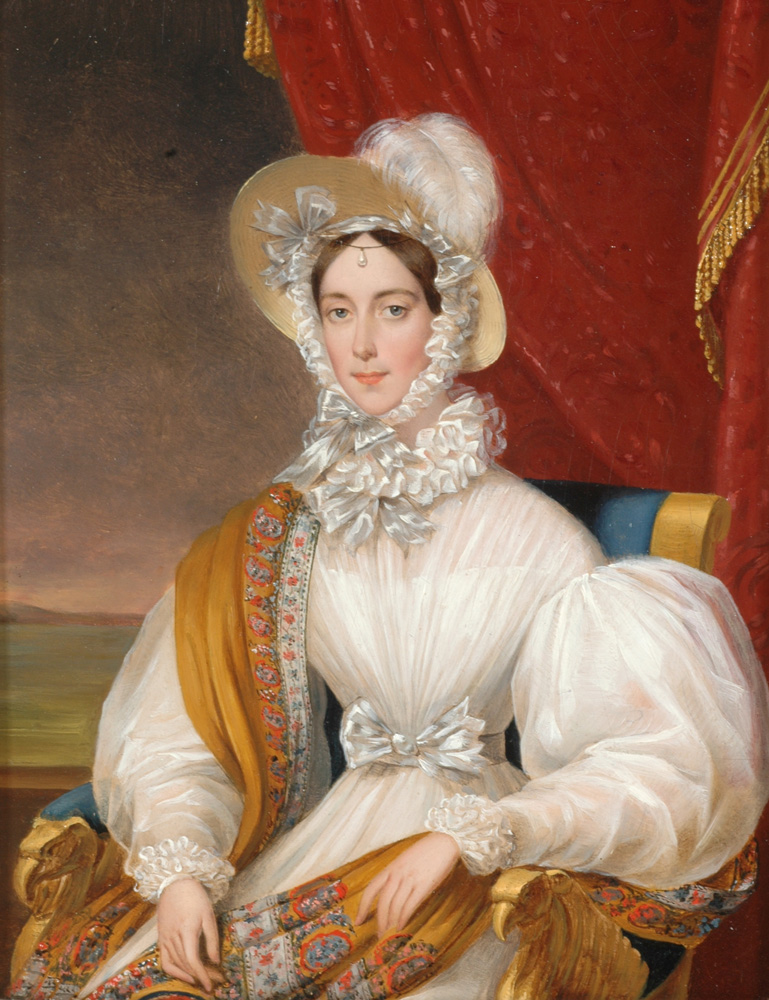
- Portrait by Johann Ender, c. 1825–35

Empress consort of Austria
- Tenure: 2 March 1835 – 2 December 1848
- Coronation: 12 September 1836, Prague

Queen consort of Hungary
- Tenure: 12 February 1831 – 2 December 1848
- Born: 19 September 1803; Palazzo Colonna, Rome, Papal States
- Died: 4 May 1884 (aged 80); Prague Castle, Prague, Austria-Hungary
- Burial: Imperial Crypt, Vienna
- Spouse: Ferdinand I of Austria (m. 1831; died 1875)
Names
- Italian: Maria Anna Ricciarda Carolina Pia di Savoia
- House: Savoy
- Father: Victor Emmanuel I of Sardinia
- Mother: Maria Theresa of Austria-Este

Maria Anna of Savoy (Italian: Maria Anna Ricciarda Carolina Margherita Pia; 19 September 1803 – 4 May 1884) was Empress of Austria and Queen of Hungary (see Grand title of the Empress of Austria) by marriage to Emperor Ferdinand I of Austria. Born into the House of Savoy, she was the penultimate child and daughter of King Victor Emmanuel I of Sardinia and Archduchess Maria Theresa of Austria-Este.

== Biography ==
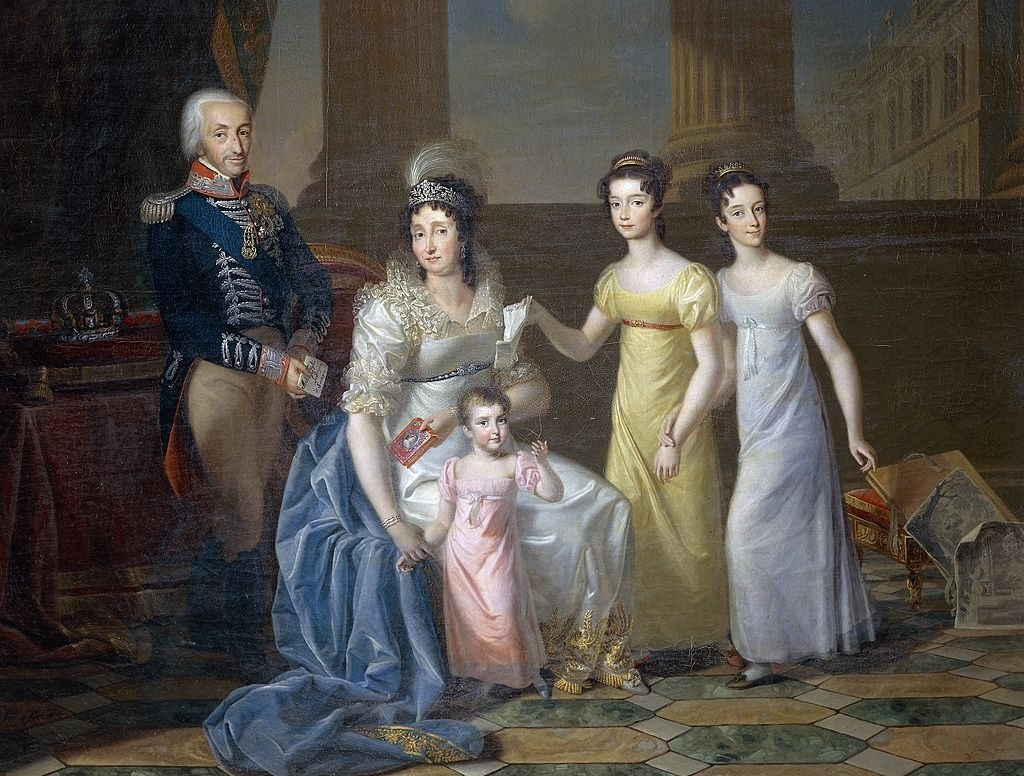
Portrait of Maria Anna along with her twin sister Maria Teresa (right), and her father King Victor Emmanuel I of Sardinia and her mother Archduchess Maria Theresa of Austria-Este (painted by Luigi Bernero)

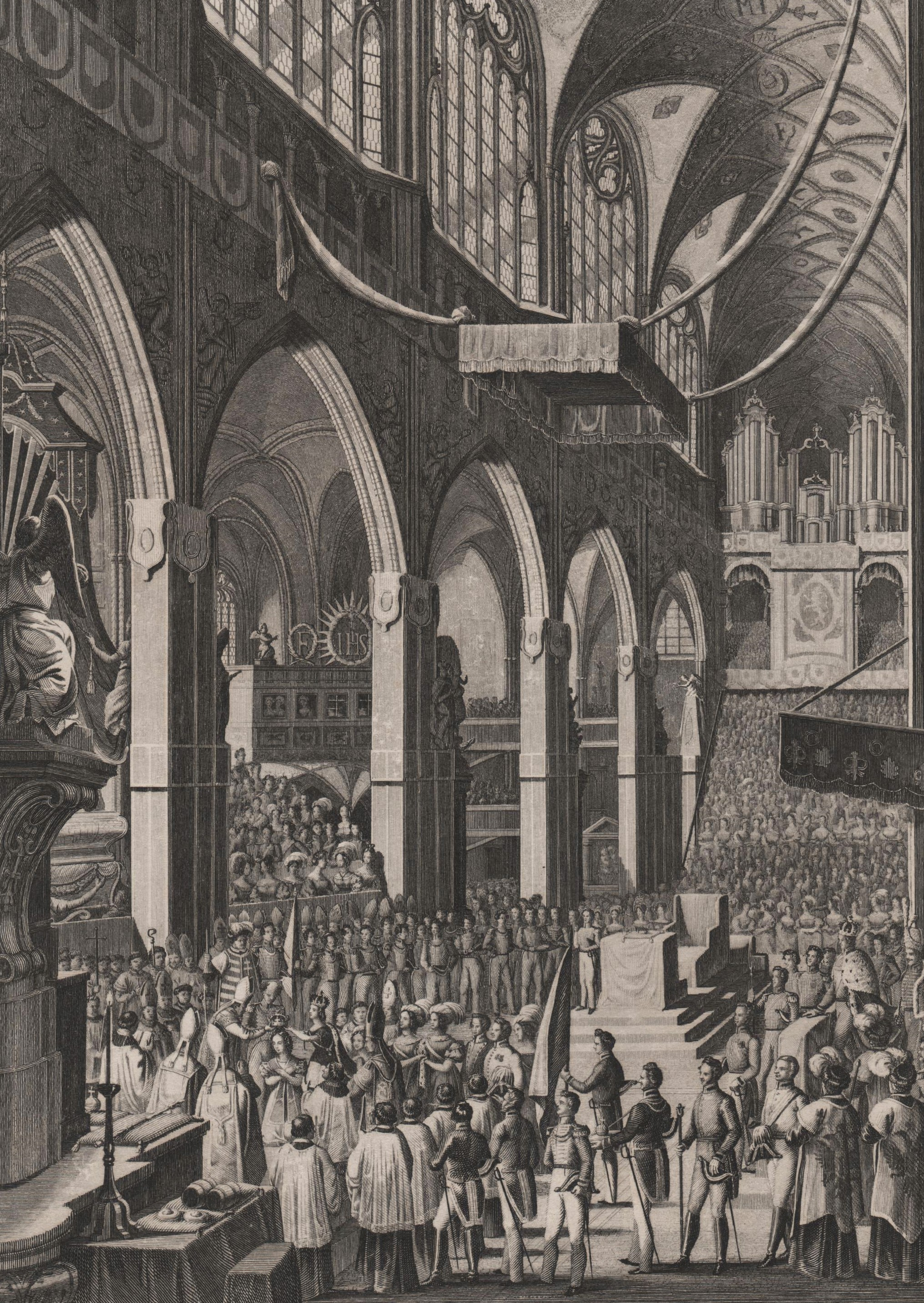
Coronation of Ferdinand I of Austria and Maria Anna of Sardinia as King and Queen of Bohemia, in Prague in 1836

Maria Anna was born on 19 September 1803 in Palazzo Colonna in Rome, the daughter of King Victor Emmanuel I of Sardinia and his wife, Archduchess Maria Teresa of Austria-Este. She had a twin sister, Maria Teresa. The two princesses were baptised by Pope Pius VII. Their godparents were their maternal grandparents, Archduke Ferdinand of Austria-Este and his wife Maria Beatrice Ricciarda d'Este. In the Museo di Roma can be seen a painting of the baptism. She was known as "Pia" within the family.

On 12 February 1831, Maria Anna was married by procuration in Turin to King Ferdinand V of Hungary, eldest son and heir apparent of Emperor Francis I of Austria. On 27 February, the couple were married in person in Vienna in the Hofburg chapel by the cardinal archbishop of Olmütz. Maria Anna was selected to marry the future emperor at the age of 27, which was very late for a princess to marry in this time period. However, her age was seen as a sign that she would be more settled, religious, and easier to manage.

Maria Anna and Ferdinand had no children. Ferdinand succeeded as emperor of Austria on 2 March 1835; Maria Anna became empress. On 12 September 1836, she was crowned queen of Bohemia in Prague.

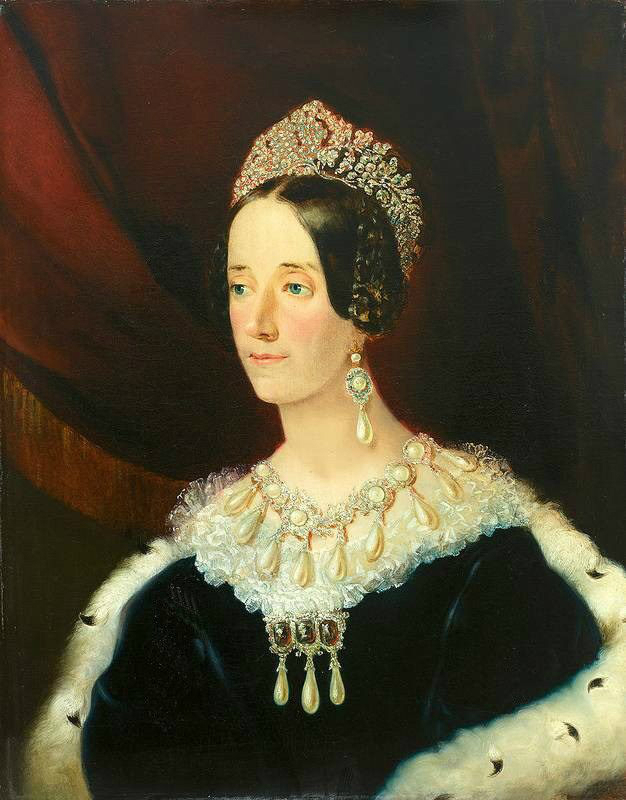
Empress Maria Anna in 1841

Maria Anna never learned to speak German during her tenure as empress but preferred to speak French. She enjoyed some popularity as empress, and a festival was celebrated on her name day, 26 July each year. Minister Metternich managed the Government during the reign of her spouse. Unlike her sister-in-law Sophie of Bavaria, Maria Anna had no influence on policy. She supported Emperor Ferdinand, who was unable to manage state affairs because of his health and was respected for her devotion. Maria Anna referred to herself as his "nurse" highlighting her caring role in his life.

During the 1848 Revolution, Maria Anna retracted her support from the Metternich Policy with support from Sophie of Bavaria. However, she did voice her opinion that stronger measures should be taken against the revolution.

On 2 December 1848, Ferdinand abdicated. Maria Anna was popular in Prague, where she was engaged in a local charity.

== Death ==
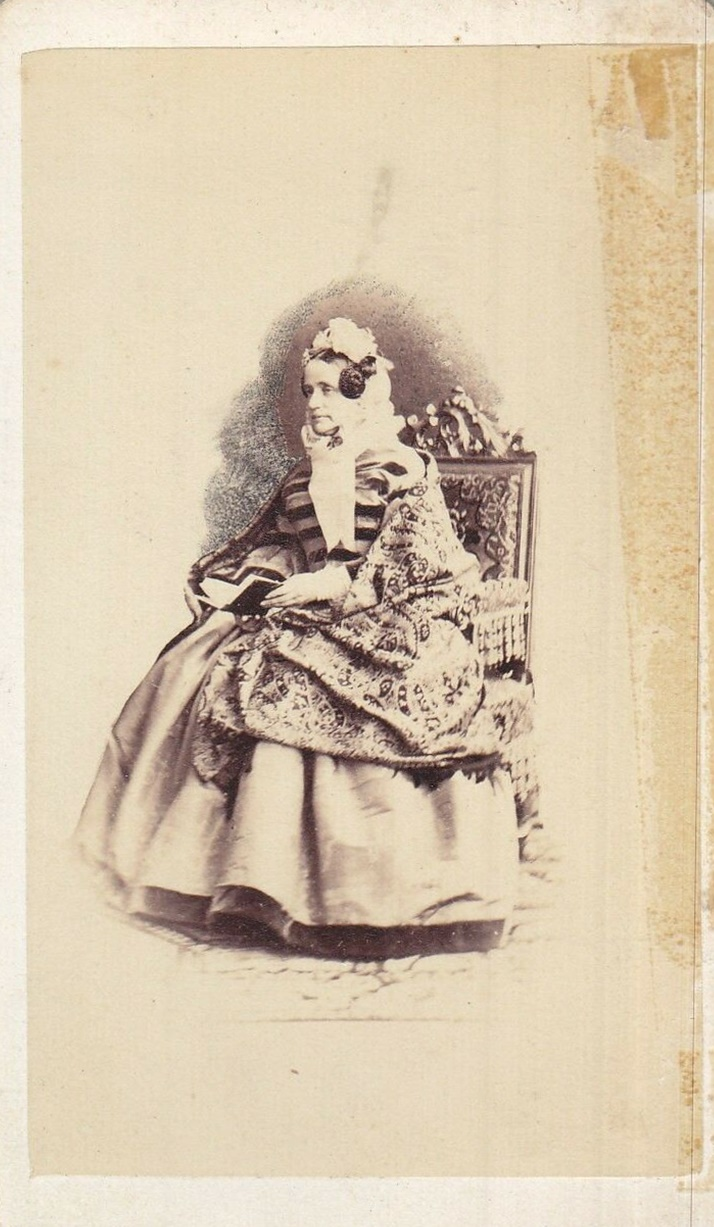
Maria Anna in her final years

Maria Anna died in Prague on 4 May 1884, at the age of 80. She is buried next to her husband in tomb number 63, along with other members of the House of Habsburg in the Imperial Crypt in Vienna. She was the last surviving member of the main branch of House Savoy.

== Honours ==
- Austria-Hungary : Dame of the Order of the Starry Cross
- Spain : Dame of the Order of Queen Maria Luisa

== Ancestry ==
Ancestors of Maria Anna of Savoy

8. Charles Emmanuel III of Sardinia
4. Victor Amadeus III of Sardinia
9. Polyxena of Hesse-Rotenburg
2. Victor Emmanuel I of Sardinia
10. Philip V of Spain
5. Maria Antonia Ferdinanda of Spain
11. Elisabeth Farnese
1. Maria Anna of Savoy
12. Francis I, Holy Roman Emperor
6. Ferdinand Karl, Archduke of Austria-Este
13. Maria Theresa of Austria
3. Maria Theresa of Austria-Este
14. Ercole III d'Este, Duke of Modena
7. Maria Beatrice d'Este, Duchess of Massa
15. Maria Teresa Cybo-Malaspina, Duchess of Massa

== Bibliography ==
- Biographisches Lexikon des Kaiserthums Oesterreich

Maria Anna of Savoy House of Savoy Born: 19 September 1803 Died: 4 May 1884
Austro-Hungarian royalty
Preceded by Caroline Augusta of Bavaria	Empress consort of Austria; Queen consort of Dalmatia; Queen consort of Galicia and Lodomeria; Queen consort of Illyria; Queen consort of Lombardy-Venetia; Queen consort of Hungary; Queen consort of Croatia; Queen consort of Slavonia; Queen consort of Bohemia; 1835–1848	Vacant Title next held by Elisabeth in Bavaria
