= Francis V of Modena =

Duke of Modena and Reggio from 1846 to 1859

Francis V
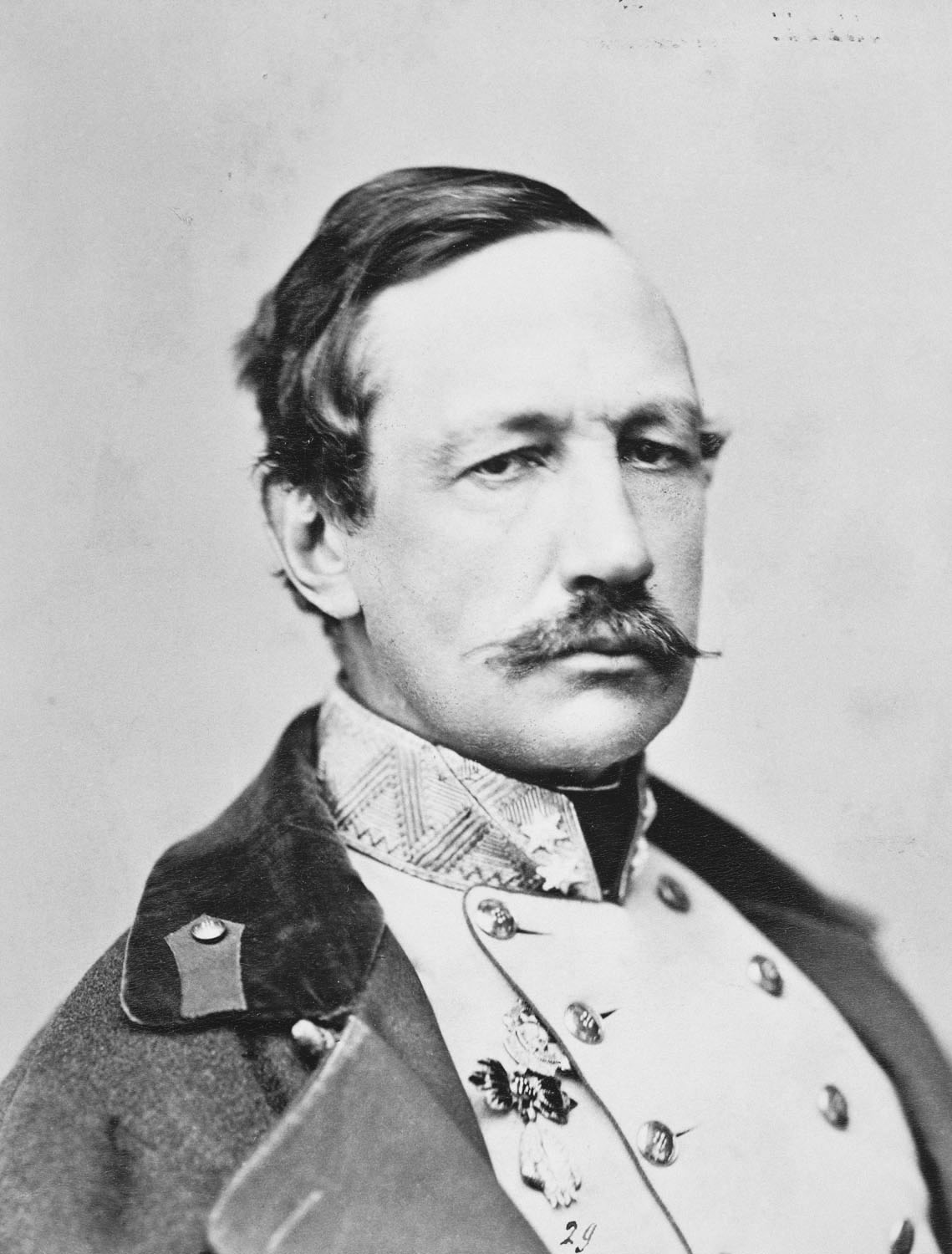
- Francis, c. 1870

Duke of Modena and Reggio
- Reign: 21 January 1846 – 11 June 1859
- Predecessor: Francis IV
- Successor: Habsburg monarchy abolished by Risorgimento
- Born: 1 June 1819; Modena, Duchy of Modena
- Died: 20 November 1875 (aged 56); Vienna, Austria-Hungary
- Burial: Capuchin Church, Vienna
- Spouse: Adelgunde of Bavaria (m. 1842)
- Issue: Archduchess Anna Beatrice
Names
- Italian: Francesco Ferdinando Geminiano
- House: Austria-Este
- Father: Francis IV of Modena
- Mother: Maria Beatrice of Savoy
- Religion: Roman Catholicism

Francis V, Duke of Modena, Reggio and Guastalla, Archduke of Austria-Este, Royal Prince of Hungary and Bohemia, Duke of Mirandola and of Massa, Prince of Carrara (Italian: Francesco Ferdinando Geminiano d'Asburgo-Lorena; 1 June 1819 – 20 November 1875) was a reigning prince. He was Duke of Modena, Reggio, and Mirandola, Duke of Guastalla from 1847 and Duke of Massa and Prince of Carrara from 1846 to 1859. His parents were Francis IV of Modena and Princess Maria Beatrice of Savoy. He was the last reigning duke of Modena before the duchy was incorporated into the Kingdom of Italy.

== Life and legacy ==
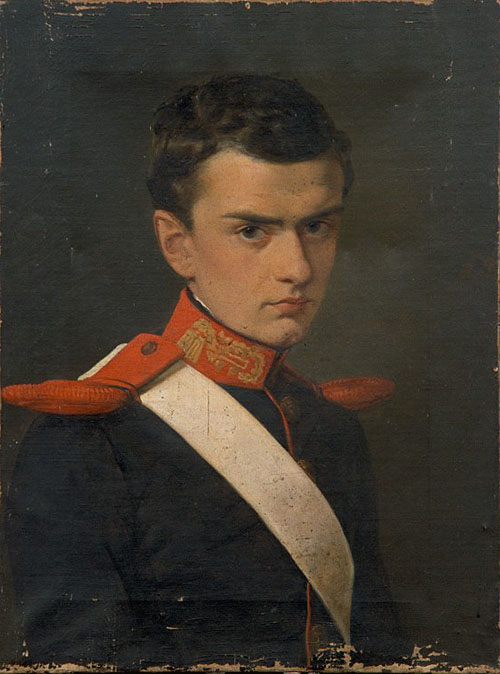
Francis V when hereditary prince, c. 1835

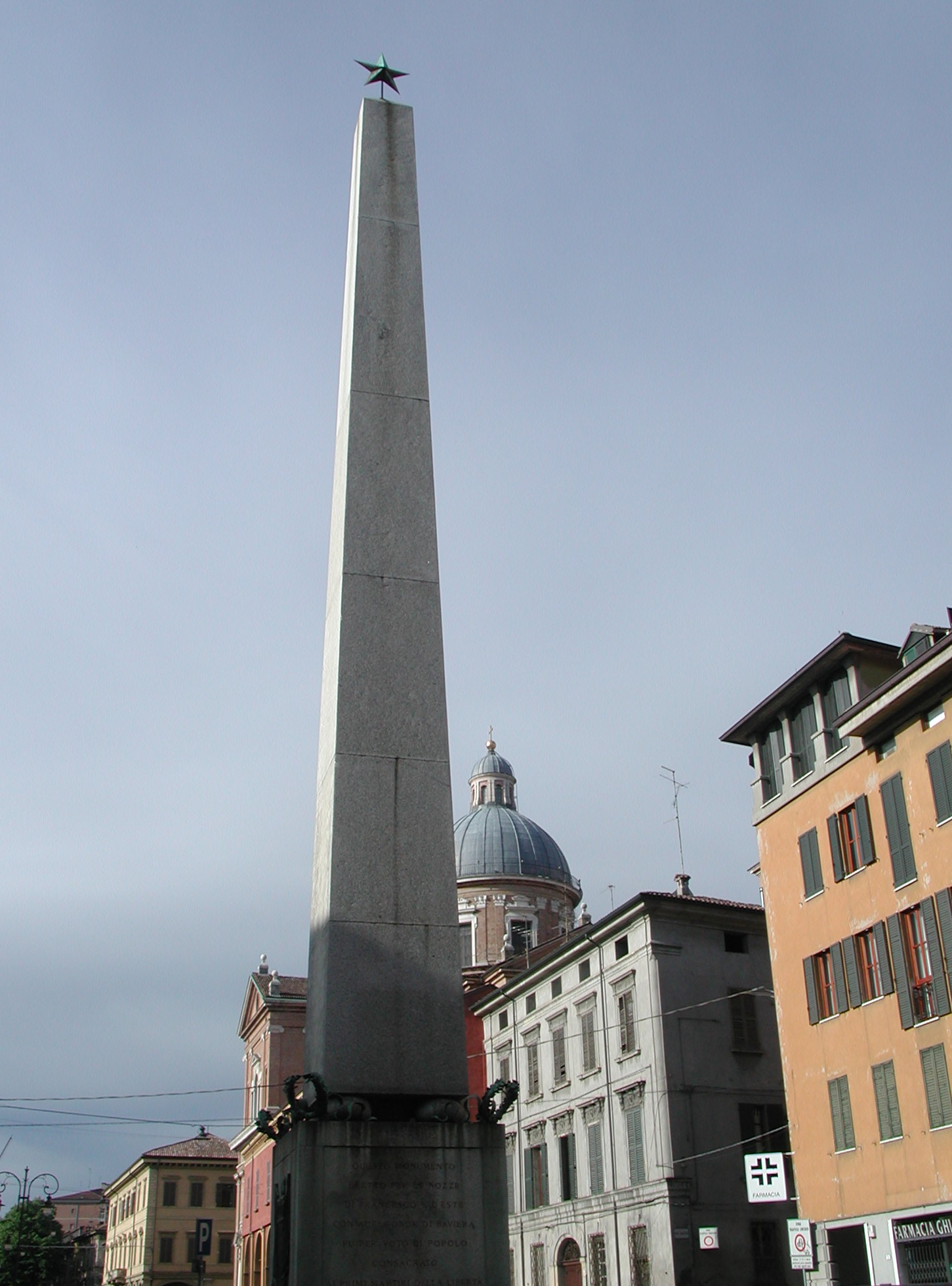
Obelisk erected in Reggio Emilia to celebrate the marriage of the Duke with Princess Adelgunde of Bavaria

Born in Modena on 1 June 1819, Francis was baptised five days after birth by the local archbishop in the local cathedral; Emperor Francis I of Austria, the former Holy Roman Emperor, was his godfather, but his uncle Archduke Ferdinand acted as proxy for the emperor.

In 1826 Francis IV of Modena appointed Count Clemente Coronini as tutor to Francis, with Don Pietro Raffaelli, who would later become Bishop of Carpi and Reggio, as his assistant. In 1829, Baron Ernest Geramb became Francis's new tutor.

On 15 September 1836, Francis became a Knight of the Austrian Order of the Golden Fleece, and 3 years later he received the Grand Cordon of the Order of the Netherlands Lion.

After the death of his mother in 1840, Francis was considered the legitimate heir to the thrones of England, Scotland and Ireland by Jacobites as Francis I. At his death his younger brother's daughter Maria Theresa of Austria-Este became Jacobite claimant.

On 30 March 1842, Francis married Princess Adelgunde of Bavaria, daughter of King Ludwig I of Bavaria, in the Allerheiligen-Hofkirche at the Munich Residenz. The Archbishop of Munich-Freising was the chief officiant of the wedding. The couple had only one child, Princess Anna Beatrice (19 October 1848 in Gries, Bolzano – 8 July 1849 in Modena).

In 1842, Francis received another order: the Order of the Most Holy Annunciation.

At the death of his father Francis IV of Modena on 21 January 1846, Francis succeeded as reigning duke of Modena. As member of a cadet branch of the House of Habsburg-Lorraine he also bore the titles of an Archduke of Austria and a Prince Royal of Hungary and Bohemia from birth; from his father he inherited also the titles of Duke of Reggio and Mirandola, Duke of Massa, Prince of Carrara and Lunigiana. At the death of his cousin the Duchess Marie-Louise of Parma on 18 December 1847, he succeeded as Duke of Guastalla.

During the revolutions of 1848, Francis was forced to flee his duchy by a popular uprising and was restored by Austrian troops in the following year.

In 1855, Francis established his own new order: the Order of the Eagle of Este, of which he acted as Grand Master.

In 1859 the Duchy of Modena was invaded by armies of France and Sardinia in the Second Italian War of Independence. On 11 June, Francis fled and his government was overthrown on 14 June. The duchy was incorporated into the United Provinces of Central Italy. On 18 March 1860, King Victor Emanuel II of Sardinia ordered Modena to be incorporated into the new Kingdom of Italy. Francis protested against this four days later.

After the loss of his duchy, Francis withdrew to Vienna, where he lived in the Palais Modena. He also had a summer residence at Schloss Wildenwart in Bavaria. Although he spent most of his time in Austria he occasionally traveled and in 1864, he visited the Middle East.

On 7 March 1861, William Ewart Gladstone, the British Chancellor of the Exchequer, made a verbal attack against Francis in the House of Commons, primarily accusing Francis of having violated criminal procedure by imposing excessive punishments. Constantine Phipps, Marquess of Normanby, published a book later that year rebutting all of Gladstone's charges against Francis.

Francis died at Vienna on 20 November 1875. He left most of his huge estate to his second cousin twice removed Archduke Franz Ferdinand of Austria, who subsequently used the title Archduke of Austria-Este in keeping with the strict terms of the will. Francis's remains were kept at the Capuchin Church in Vienna.

== Ancestors ==
Ancestors of Francis V of Modena

8. Francis I, Holy Roman Emperor
4. Ferdinand Karl, Archduke of Austria-Este
9. Maria Theresa of Austria
2. Francis IV, Duke of Modena
10. Ercole III d'Este, Duke of Modena
5. Maria Beatrice d'Este, Duchess of Massa
11. Maria Teresa Cybo-Malaspina, Duchess of Massa
1. Francis V, Duke of Modena
12. Victor Amadeus III of Sardinia
6. Victor Emmanuel I of Sardinia
13. Maria Antonia Ferdinanda of Spain
3. Maria Beatrice of Savoy
14. Ferdinand Karl, Archduke of Austria-Este (= 4)
7. Maria Theresa of Austria-Este
15. Maria Beatrice d'Este, Duchess of Massa (= 5)

== Bibliography ==
- Giornale della Reale Ducale Brigata Estense, Ristampa anastatica Aedes Muratoriana, Modena 1977
- Gian Carlo Montanari, I Fedelissimi del Duca – La Brigata Estense, Edizioni il Fiorino, Modena 1995
- Elena Bianchini Braglia, In esilio con il Duca, Il Cerchio Iniziative Editoriali, Rimini 2007. ISBN 88-8474-134-3
- Nicola Guerra, "I filoestensi apuani durante il processo di unita' nazionale" in Rassegna storica Toscana, 2003

Francis V of Modena House of Austria-Este Cadet branch of the Habsburg-Lorraine Born: 1 June 1819 Died: 20 November 1875
Regnal titles
Preceded by Francis IV	Duke of Modena and Reggio; 1846–1859	Italian unification
Royal titles
Preceded by Francis IV	Archduke of Austria-Este; 1846–1875	Succeeded by Franz Ferdinand
Titles in pretence
Himself	— TITULAR — Duke of Modena and Reggio; 1859–1875	Succeeded by Franz Ferdinand
Preceded by Maria Beatrice of Savoy	— TITULAR — King of England, Scotland and Ireland; 1840–1875; Reason for succession failure: Glorious Revolution	Succeeded by Maria Theresa of Austria-Este
