= Princess Adelgunde of Bavaria, Duchess of Modena =

Duchess of Modena and Reggio from 1846 to 1859

Adelgunde of Bavaria
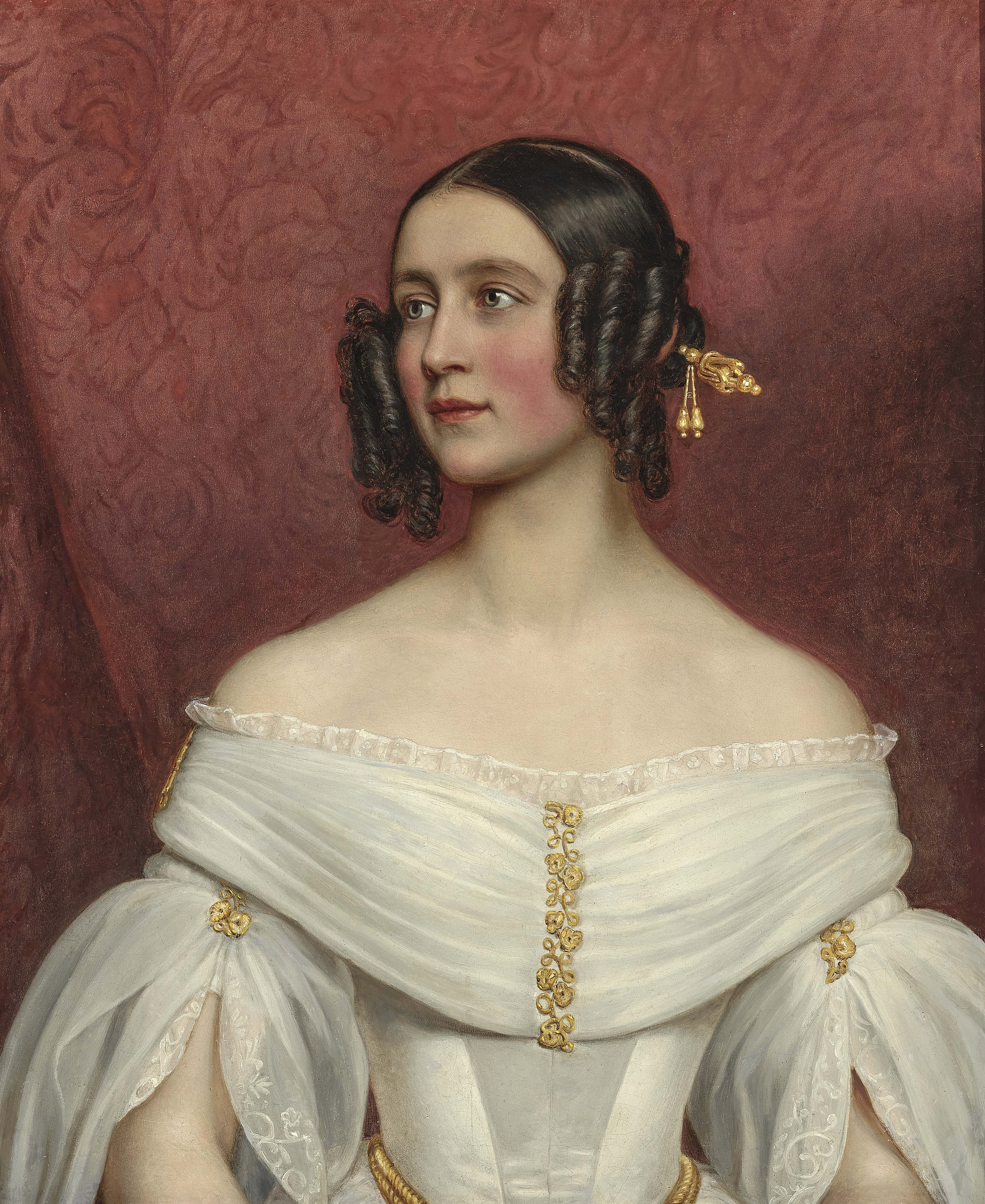
- Portrait by Joseph Karl Stieler, 1842

Duchess consort of Modena and Reggio
- Tenure: 21 January 1846 – 11 June 1859
- Born: 19 March 1823; Würzburg, Kingdom of Bavaria
- Died: 28 October 1914 (aged 91); Munich, Kingdom of Bavaria, German Empire
- Spouse: Francis V, Duke of Modena (m. 1842; died 1875)
- Issue: Archduchess Anne Beatrice
Names
- Adelgunde Auguste Charlotte Caroline Elisabeth Amalie Marie Sophie Luise
- House: Wittelsbach
- Father: Ludwig I of Bavaria
- Mother: Therese of Saxe-Hildburghausen

Princess Adelgunde of Bavaria (German: Adelgunde Auguste Charlotte Caroline Elisabeth Amalie Marie Sophie Luise von Bayern; 19 March 1823 – 28 October 1914) was a daughter of Ludwig I of Bavaria and Therese of Saxe-Hildburghausen. She was Duchess of Modena by her marriage to Francis V, Duke of Modena.

Her siblings included Maximilian II of Bavaria, Mathilde, Grand Duchess of Hesse and by Rhine, King Otto of Greece and Luitpold, Prince Regent of Bavaria.

== Early life and marriage ==
Princess Adelgunde of Bavaria was born on 19 March 1823 in Würzburg as the sixth child of Ludwig I of Bavaria and Therese of Saxe-Hildburghausen.

On 20 March 1842 in Munich, Adelgunde married Archduke Francis of Austria-Este (1819–75), eldest son of Francis IV, Duke of Modena and Maria Beatrice of Savoy. The couple had only one child, Princess Anne Beatrice Theresa Maria (October 19, 1848 in Gries, Bolzano – July 8, 1849 in Modena), who died in infancy.

Francis acceded to the ducal throne on his father's death in 1846 as Francis V. After the Italian Unification, Francis was deposed, and he and his wife were exiled to Vienna, where he died fifteen years later. Immediately after realizing that war would break out, Duchess Adelgunde effectively abandoned Modena.

== Later years ==
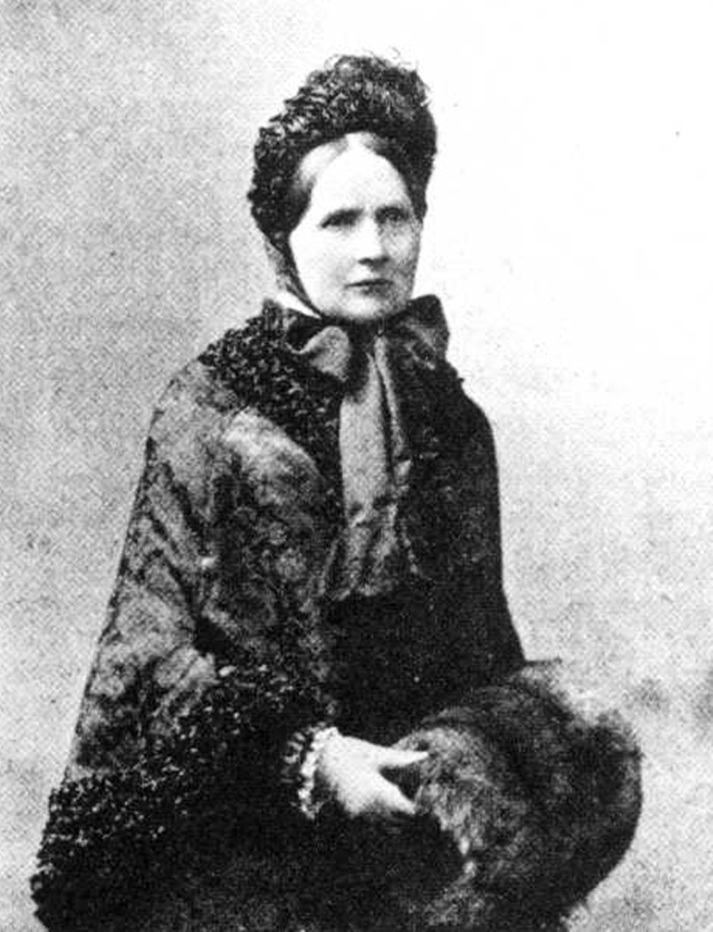
Adelgunde in her final years

Although she initially inhabited the Palazzo dei Musei in Modena following the death of her husband, it was by 1877 in the hands of Archduke Franz Ferdinand. Adelgunde survived her husband for many years and died in Munich at the age of 91. She never remarried and is interred in Vienna.

A pearl brooch formerly owned by her was auctioned at Sotheby's in 2012.

== Ancestry ==
Ancestors of Princess Adelgunde of Bavaria, Duchess of Modena

8. Frederick Michael, Count Palatine of Zweibrücken
4. Maximilian I Joseph of Bavaria
9. Countess Palatine Maria Franziska of Sulzbach
2. Ludwig I of Bavaria
10. Prince George William of Hesse-Darmstadt
5. Princess Augusta Wilhelmine of Hesse-Darmstadt
11. Countess Maria Louise Albertine of Leiningen-Dagsburg-Falkenburg
1. Princess Adelgunde of Bavaria
12. Ernest Frederick III, Duke of Saxe-Hildburghausen
6. Frederick, Duke of Saxe-Altenburg
13. Princess Ernestine of Saxe-Weimar-Eisenach
3. Princess Therese of Saxe-Hildburghausen
14. Charles II, Grand Duke of Mecklenburg-Strelitz
7. Duchess Charlotte Georgine of Mecklenburg-Strelitz
15. Princess Friederike of Hesse-Darmstadt

Princess Adelgunde of Bavaria, Duchess of Modena House of Wittelsbach Born: 19 March 1823 Died: 28 January 1914
Italian royalty
| Vacant Title last held by Maria Beatrice of Savoy | Duchess consort of Modena and Reggio; 21 January 1846 – 11 June 1859 | Duchy abolished in 1859 |
Titles in pretence
| Duchy abolished in 1859 | — TITULAR — Duchess consort of Modena and Reggio; 11 June 1859 – 20 November 1875; Reason for succession failure: Italian unification | Vacant Title next held by Zita of Bourbon-Parma |
| Vacant Title last held by Francis IV, Duke of Modena as Prince consort | — TITULAR — Queen consort of England, Scotland and Ireland; 20 March 1842 – 20 November 1875; Reason for succession failure: Glorious Revolution | Succeeded by Ludwig III of Bavaria as Prince consort |
