= Duchy of Reggio =

Duchy in Northern Italy

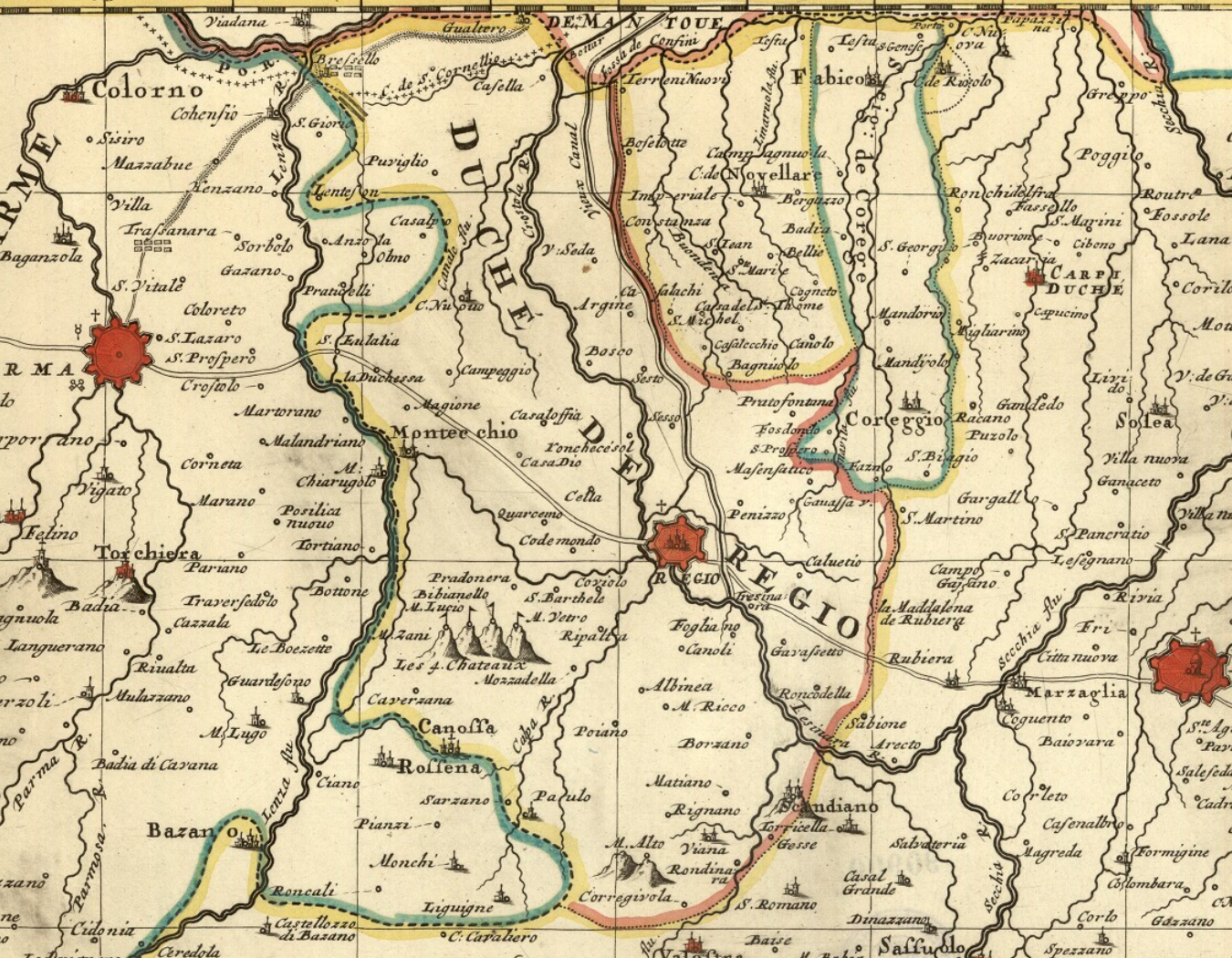
Map of the Duchy of Reggio in the 18th century

The Duchy of Reggio (Italian: Ducato di Reggio) was one of the states that belonged to the Duchy of Modena and Reggio. The Duchy lies west to that of Modena. It was ruled by the House of Este, in the north of Italy, in a territory now belonging to the Province of Reggio Emilia. The capital was Reggio.

The perimeter of the duchy was from the Apennines to the river Po. The ancient borders were with the County of Novellara and Bagnolo (ruled by a branch of the House of Gonzaga), and the County of Guastalla, the Principality of Correggio, the Duchy of Modena and Garfagnana, all ruled by the dukes of Este. Other neighbouring states were Lucca, Tuscany, the Duchy of Parma, and the Marquisate of Mantua.
