= Maria Theresa of Austria-Este, Queen of Bavaria =

Queen of Bavaria from 1913 to 1918

Maria Theresa of Austria-Este
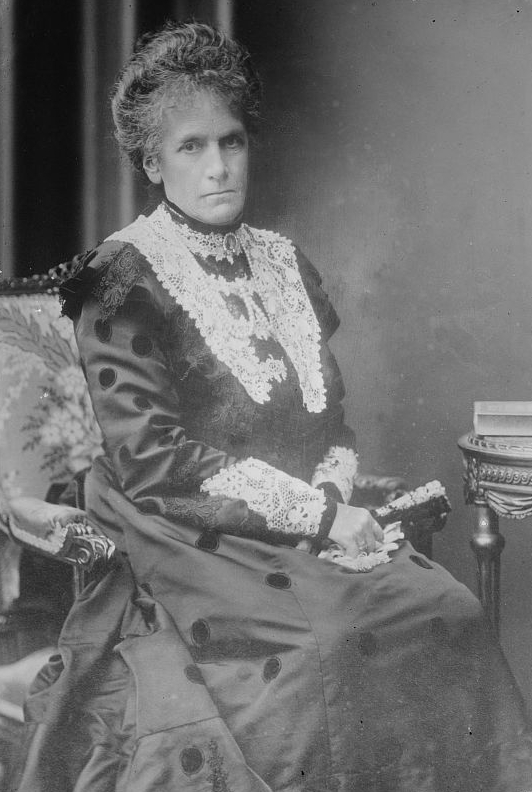
- Queen Maria Theresa c. 1910–15

Queen consort of Bavaria
- Tenure: 5 November 1913 – 7 November 1918
- Born: 2 July 1849; Brünn, Austrian Empire
- Died: 3 February 1919 (aged 69); Wildenwart Castle, Chiemgau, Bavaria, Germany
- Burial: 5 November 1921; Frauenkirche, Munich
- Spouse: Ludwig III of Bavaria (m. 1868)
- Issue More: Rupprecht, Crown Prince of Bavaria; Princess Adelgunde, Princess of Hohenzollern; Princess Maria Ludwiga, Duchess of Calabria; Prince Karl; Prince Franz; Princess Mathilde; Prince Wolfgang; Princess Hildegarde; Princess Notburga; Princess Wiltrud, Duchess of Urach; Princess Helmtrud; Princess Dietlinde; Princess Gundelinde, Countess of Preysing-Lichtenegg-Moos
- House: Austria-Este
- Father: Archduke Ferdinand of Austria-Este
- Mother: Archduchess Elisabeth Franziska of Austria

Maria Theresa Henriette Dorothea of Austria-Este (also Marie Therese; 2 July 1849 – 3 February 1919) was the last Queen of Bavaria. She was the only child of Archduke Ferdinand Karl Viktor of Austria-Este and Archduchess Elisabeth Franziska of Austria.

== Biography ==
On 20 February 1868, she married the future Ludwig III of Bavaria, eldest son of Bavaria's Luitpold, Prince Regent of Bavaria, in the Augustinerkirche in Vienna. The couple had fallen in love during a visit of Ludwig to Austria to attend the burial of his cousin Archduchess Mathilda of Austria. Their decision to marry initially angered the Emperor, who had wished for her to marry Ferdinand IV of Tuscany. The chief witness was Count Antonius Schaffgotsch.

The family mostly lived on their farms at Leutstetten south of Munich, where Maria Theresa cultivated rose gardens. She spoke German, Hungarian, Czech, French, and Italian.

Maria Theresa became queen consort of Bavaria in 1913 when her husband the ruling Prince Regent proclaimed himself king as Ludwig III in place of his cousin Otto, King of Bavaria who was alive but allegedly had a severe mental illness. She became the first Roman Catholic queen consort since Bavaria had been made a kingdom 1806.

In 1914, she hosted festivities during the royal Bavarian jubilee. She appeared with her husband when war was announced. During World War I, she visited wounded soldiers and encouraged the women of Bavaria to support the troops by providing food and clothes, including with the donations references to legendary heroines.

On 7 November 1918, Ludwig III was forced to abdicate the Bavarian throne, and Maria Theresa fled Munich with her family to Wildenwart Castle near Frasdorf, in order to escape from the Bolsheviks. The health of the Queen soon declined and she died there on 3 February 1919, being buried at the local chapel. On 5 November 1921 her remains were transferred to the Frauenkirche, Munich, along with those of her husband, who had died less than a month before.

== Jacobite succession ==
Maria Theresa was the niece and heir-general of the childless Francis V, Duke of Modena who had been, at the time of his death, the Jacobite heir-general to the thrones of England, Scotland and Ireland. She became the heiress after his death in 1875. She never pursued this claim, although the Order of the White Rose, founded in 1886 by Bertram Ashburnham, 5th Earl of Ashburnham, hoped to put her on the throne. Following her death in 1919, Maria Theresa's son Rupprecht, Crown Prince of Bavaria inherited the Jacobite claim. Like his mother, he and his descendants have not pursued a claim to the British thrones. She was second cousin of Queen Mary of the United Kingdom, both of them being great-granddaughters of Duke Louis of Württemberg.

== Family ==
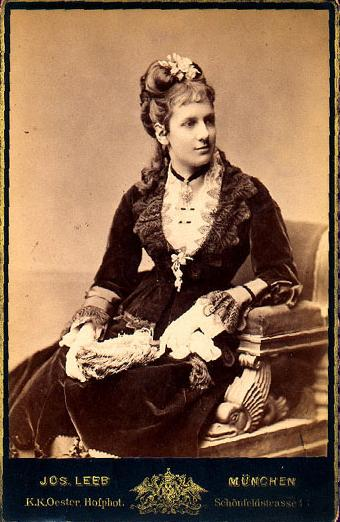
Princess Maria Theresa of Bavaria, future Queen of Bavaria, 1870s

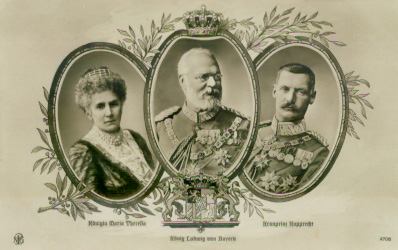
Queen Maria Theresa, King Ludwig III and their son crown prince Rupprecht

On 20 February 1868, at the Augustinian Church, Vienna, Maria Theresa married the future Ludwig III, last king of Bavaria.

The couple had thirteen children:

- Rupprecht, Crown Prince of Bavaria (18 May 1869 – 2 August 1955).
- Princess Adelgunde (17 October 1870 – 4 January 1958), married on 20 January 1915 to Prince Wilhelm of Hohenzollern-Sigmaringen.
- Princess Maria (6 July 1872 – 10 June 1954), married on 31 May 1897 to Prince Ferdinando Pius, Duke of Calabria.
- Prince Karl (1 April 1874 – 9 May 1927).
- Prince Franz (10 October 1875 – 25 January 1957), married on 8 July 1912 to Princess Isabella Antonie of Croÿ. Had issue.
- Princess Mathilde (17 August 1877 – 6 August 1906), married on 1 May 1900 to Prince Ludwig of Saxe-Coburg and Gotha.
- Prince Wolfgang Maria Leopold (2 July 1879 – 31 January 1895).
- Princess Hildegarde (5 March 1881 – 2 February 1948).
- Princess Notburga (19 March 1883 – 24 March 1883).
- Princess Wiltrud (10 November 1884 – 28 March 1975), married on 26 November 1924 to Wilhelm Karl, Duke of Urach.
- Princess Helmtrud (22 March 1886 – 23 June 1977).
- Princess Dietlinde (2 January 1888 – 14 February 1889), lived 13 months.
- Princess Gundelinde (26 August 1891 – 16 August 1983), married on 23 February 1919 to Johann Georg, Count von Preysing-Lichtenegg-Moos. Gundelinde and Johann Georg are great-grandparents of Olympia, Princess Napoléon.

== Honours ==
- Kingdom of Bavaria: Grand Mistress of the Order of Saint Elizabeth and Order of Theresa (19 October 1872), the Order of Merit of the Bavarian Crown, the Cross of Merit for the Year 1870/71, the Cross of Merit for Voluntary Nursing
- Spain: Dame of the Order of Queen Maria Luisa
- Austrian Empire: Dame of the Order of the Starry Cross (10 January 1865) and Order of Elizabeth, 1st Class
- Prussia: Red Cross Medal, 1st Class (27 January 1899)

== Ancestry ==
Ancestors of Maria Theresa of Austria-Este, Queen of Bavaria

16. Francis I, Holy Roman Emperor (= 24)
8. Ferdinand Karl, Archduke of Austria-Este (= 22)
17. Maria Theresa of Austria (= 25)
4. Francis IV, Duke of Modena
18. Ercole III d'Este, Duke of Modena
9. Maria Beatrice d'Este, Duchess of Massa (= 23)
19. Maria Teresa Cybo-Malaspina, Duchess of Massa
2. Archduke Ferdinand Karl Viktor of Austria-Este
20. Victor Amadeus III of Sardinia
10. Victor Emmanuel I of Sardinia
21. Infanta Maria Antonia Ferdinanda of Spain
5. Princess Maria Beatrice of Savoy
22. Ferdinand Karl, Archduke of Austria-Este (= 8)
11. Archduchess Maria Theresa of Austria-Este
23. Maria Beatrice d'Este, Duchess of Massa (= 9)
1. Maria Theresa of Austria-Este
24. Francis I, Holy Roman Emperor (= 16)
12. Leopold II, Holy Roman Emperor
25. Maria Theresa of Austria (= 17)
6. Archduke Joseph, Palatine of Hungary
26. Charles III of Spain
13. Infanta Maria Luisa of Spain
27. Maria Amalia of Saxony
3. Archduchess Elisabeth Franziska of Austria
28. Frederick II Eugene, Duke of Württemberg
14. Duke Louis of Württemberg
29. Princess Friederike of Brandenburg-Schwedt
7. Duchess Maria Dorothea of Württemberg
30. Charles Christian, Prince of Nassau-Weilburg
15. Princess Henriette of Nassau-Weilburg
31. Princess Carolina of Orange-Nassau

== Bibliography ==
- Schad, Martha. Bayerns Königinnen. Regensburg: Friedrich Pustet, 1992. Includes a 75-page chapter on Marie Therese.
- Beckenbauer, Alfons. Ludwig III. von Bayern, 1845-1921, Ein König auf der Suche nach seinem Volk. Regensburg: Friedrich Pustet, 1987. The standard modern biography of Marie Therese's husband.
- Glaser, Hubert. Ludwig III. König von Bayern: Skizzen aus seiner Lebensgeschichte. Prien: Verkerhrsverband Chiemsee, 1995. An illustrated catalogue of an exhibition held in Wildenwart in 1995.

Maria Theresa of Austria-Este, Queen of Bavaria House of Austria-Este Cadet branch of the House of Habsburg-Lorraine Born: 2 July 1849 Died: 3 February 1919
German royalty
Vacant Title last held by Marie of Prussia	Queen consort of Bavaria; 5 November 1913 – 13 November 1918	Monarchy abolished
Titles in pretence
Republic declared	— TITULAR — Queen consort of Bavaria; 13 November 1918 – 3 February 1919	Vacant Title next held by Antonia of Luxembourg
Preceded by Francis V, Duke of Modena	— TITULAR — Queen of England, Scotland and Ireland; 1875–1919; Reason for succession failure: Glorious Revolution	Succeeded by Rupprecht, Crown Prince of Bavaria
