= Archduke Ferdinand Karl Viktor of Austria-Este =

Austrian archduke (1821–1849)

Archduke Ferdinand Karl Viktor
- Born: 20 July 1821; Modena, Duchy of Modena and Reggio
- Died: 15 December 1849 (aged 28); Brno, Margraviate of Moravia, Austrian Empire
- Spouse: Archduchess Elisabeth Franziska of Austria (m. 1847)
- Issue: Maria Theresa of Austria-Este, Queen of Bavaria
- House: Austria-Este
- Father: Francis IV of Modena
- Mother: Maria Beatrice of Savoy
- Religion: Roman Catholicism

Ferdinand Karl Viktor (Italian: Ferdinando Carlo Vittorio; 20 July 1821 – 15 December 1849) was Archduke of Austria-Este and Prince of Modena.

== Biography ==
Ferdinand Karl Viktor was born on 20 July 1821. Born in Modena, he was the second son of Francis IV of Modena and his niece and wife, Maria Beatrice of Savoy. His paternal grandmother had been heiress to the Duchy of Modena, because her father Ercole III d'Este had no sons.

At age 18 Ferdinand became a member of the Corazzieri Francesco IV regiment. After a year of service he was placed into the Principe di Prussia regiment. He was given command of a brigade in 1846.

Ferdinand married Archduchess Elisabeth Franziska of Austria on 4 October 1847, and their union produced Maria Theresa of Austria-Este, Queen of Bavaria. Ferdinand died on 15 December 1849. His widow married Archduke Karl Ferdinand of Austria on 18 April 1854.

Ferdinand is the link in the Jacobite succession between his brother Francis V, Duke of Modena and his daughter Maria Theresa of Austria-Este.

== Ancestry ==
Ancestors of Archduke Ferdinand Karl Viktor of Austria-Este

8. Francis I, Holy Roman Emperor
4. Ferdinand Karl, Archduke of Austria-Este
9. Maria Theresa, Queen of Hungary
2. Francis IV, Duke of Modena
10. Ercole III d'Este, Duke of Modena
5. Maria Beatrice d'Este, Duchess of Massa
11. Maria Teresa Cybo-Malaspina, Duchess of Massa
1. Archduke Ferdinand Karl Viktor of Austria-Este
12. Victor Amadeus III of Sardinia
6. Victor Emmanuel I of Sardinia
13. Maria Antonia Ferdinanda of Spain
3. Maria Beatrice of Savoy
14. Ferdinand Karl, Archduke of Austria-Este (= 4)
7. Maria Theresa of Austria-Este
15. Maria Beatrice d'Este, Duchess of Massa (= 5)

== Works cited ==
- Galvani, Cesare (1850). Orazione funebre per s.a.r. l'arciduca Ferdinando Carlo Vittorio d'Austria-Este. Coi tipi della R.D. Camera.
- Sangiuliani, Antonio (1858). Almanacco di Corte. Parma Tipograpfia Reale.
