= House of Austria-Este =

House of Habsburg-Lorraine cadet branch

Habsburg-Este House of Austria-Este
- Motto: Dextera Domini exaltavit me (Latin for 'The right hand of the Lord has exalted me')
- Parent house: Habsburg-Lorraine (agnatic); Este (enatic)
- Country: Italy; Austria; Belgium; Former countries: Holy Roman Empire; Modena and Reggio; Massa and Carrara; Austrian Empire; Austria-Hungary
- Founded: 1771; 255 years ago
- Founder: Ferdinand Karl, Archduke of Austria-Este & Maria Beatrice, Duchess of Massa, Archduchess of Austria-Este
- Current head: Prince Lorenz of Belgium, Archduke of Austria-Este
- Final ruler: Francis V, Duke of Modena
- Titles: Archduke of Austria-Este; Prince/Princess of Belgium; Former titles: Duke of Modena and Reggio (1814–1859); Duke of Mirandola and Marquis of Concordia (1815–1859); Duke of Massa and Prince of Carrara (1829–1859); Duke of Guastalla (1847–1859); King of England, Scotland, France, and Ireland (Jacobite claim; 1840–1919)
- Styles: "Imperial and Royal Highness"; "Majesty"; "Grace"
- Deposition: 1859 (Annexation of Italy)

The House of Habsburg-Este (Italian: Casa d'Asburgo-Este), also known as the House of Austria-Este (German: Haus Österreich-Este) and holder of the title of Archduke of Austria-Este (Italian: Arciduca d'Austria-Este; German: Erzherzog von Österreich-Este), is a cadet branch (but not sovereign branch) of the House of Habsburg-Lorraine, which originally also descended from the House of Este in the cognatic line. It was created in 1771 with the marriage between Ferdinand of Habsburg-Lorraine and Maria Beatrice d'Este, only daughter of the Duke of Modena, Ercole III d'Este. After the death of Ercole III in 1803, the Modena ruling branch of the Este family's male line ended, and the Habsburg-Este line subsequently inherited their possessions and titles. The male line of the new house also became extinct in 1875, but it was then continued, by will, as a new non-sovereign cadet branch of the Habsburg-Lorraine, still flourishing in Belgium in the 21st century, where official documents, from art. 1 of Title IX of the Constitution, have definitively established the family name as Austria-Este ('Autriche-Este' in French, or 'Oostenrijk-Este' in Dutch, or 'Österreich-Este' in German).

== History ==
=== Origins ===
During the 18th century, the unhappy marriage between the last male heir of the House of Este, the future Duke of Modena and Reggio, Ercole III, and the sovereign Duchess of Massa and Carrara, Maria Teresa Cybo-Malaspina, produced only one surviving child, Maria Beatrice. However, the Salic law excluded her, as a woman, from the succession to her father, while she was entitled to succeed her mother since it was derogated in the Duchy of Massa and Carrara by virtue of a 1529 decree of the Emperor Charles V. When it became obvious that the princely couple would not produce a large offspring, the reigning Duke, Francis III, set out to prevent Modena from suffering the same fate as Ferrara almost two centuries earlier, simply being reincorporated into the Empire as a vacant imperial fief.

Thus, in 1753, two simultaneous treaties (one public and one secret) were concluded between the House of Este and the House of Austria, by which the Archduke Leopold, Empress Maria Theresa's ninth-born child and third son, and Maria Beatrice were engaged, and the former was designated by Francis III as heir for the imperial investiture as Duke of Modena and Reggio in the event of extinction of the Este male line. In the meantime, Francis would cover the office of governor of Milan ad interim, which was destined for the archduke. In 1761, however, following the death of an older brother, Leopold became the second-born of the imperial couple and was soon designated to inherit the throne of the Grand Duchy of Tuscany, erected into a "secundogeniture". Therefore, the treaties had to be accordingly revised. In 1763, in spite of the harsh opposition of Maria Beatrice's father, the two families agreed to simply replace the name of Leopold with that of Maria Theresa's fourteenth child, and now the third son, Archduke Ferdinand Karl, who was four years younger than his betrothed. In January 1771 the Perpetual Diet of Regensburg ratified Ferdinand's future investiture and, in October, Maria Beatrice and he finally got married in Milan, thus giving rise to the new House of Austria-Este.

=== The Duchy ===
Ercole III finally ascended the throne in 1780 upon the death of Francis III, but was deposed in 1796 by the French. His States were transformed into the Cispadane Republic, which one year later was merged into the Cisalpine Republic and then into the Napoleonic Kingdom of Italy. Ercole was compensated with the small principality of Breisgau in southwestern Germany, and when he died in 1803, it passed to his son-in-law, who in 1805 lost it to the enlarged and elevated Grand Duchy of Baden during the Napoleonic reorganization of the western territories of the defunct Holy Roman Empire. In December 1805, Ferdinand died without ever having had the opportunity to exercise his prerogatives as heir to the Este States. Maria Beatrice had succeeded her mother as Duchess of Massa and Carrara in 1790, but she too had been deposed by the French invasion in 1796.

After the end of the Napoleonic era, in accordance with the 'principle of legitimacy' advocated by Metternich at the Congress of Vienna, Maria Beatrice was restored as sovereign of the Duchy of Massa and Principality of Carrara in 1815, and her son Francis IV was placed on the throne of the Duchy of Modena and Reggio as the legitimate heir of Archduke Ferdinand, his father, in turn held to be the legal successor of Ercole III. The Imperial fiefs in Lunigiana, which were not re-established, were also bestowed upon Maria Beatrice, but she almost immediately handed them over to her son Francis IV with an agreement in December 1815. Maria Beatrice died in 1829 and was succeeded as ruler of Massa and Carrara by Francis IV as well, who in a few years completely assimilated her ancient Tuscan domains within the 'Este States' (Stati Estensi), as his Duchy was officially styled.

Maria Beatrice of Savoy, elder daughter of Maria Theresa, Queen of Sardinia, married her maternal uncle Francis IV, who was succeeded by their eldest son Francis V; her younger sister, Maria Teresa of Savoy, married the Duke of Lucca, later Charles II, Duke of Parma. After the death of Maria Beatrice of Savoy in 1840, Francis V was considered the legitimate heir to the English and Scottish thrones by the Jacobites. The House of Austria-Este was to rule Modena until 1859, when the Este States lost its independence and was soon incorporated into the newly united Kingdom of Italy; Francis V, the last duke, was deposed and withdrew to his estates in Austria.

=== Austro-Hungarian Empire ===
When Francis died in Vienna on 20 November 1875, his family became extinct in the male line. His heir presumptive would have been his niece, Archduchess Maria Theresa, the future Queen of Bavaria; but, due to the Salic law then in force among the Habsburgs, the succession was carried out by will, in favour of a male relative in the Austrian Imperial Family. Attached to his Este ancestry, Francis V decided to try to preserve it and left most of his huge estate to his young cousin Archduke Franz Ferdinand of Austria, with certain conditions, including that the heir and future heirs use the style of Austria Este and learn Italian, and that the House of Austria-Este never be reabsorbed into the mother House of Austria, passing if necessary to a new cadet branch of the latter. Since Franz Ferdinand was the heir apparent of Archduke Karl Ludwig, younger brother to then Emperor Franz Joseph, such testamentary provisions turned Austria-Este into a sort of "secundogeniture" title within the Austrian imperial family. In the event that Franz Ferdinand and the House of Habsburg-Lorraine refused his terms, Francis stipulated that his entire inheritance would revert to his closest male relatives, his nephews of Bourbon-Spain, Carlos Maria and Alfonso Carlos, sons of his sister Maria Beatrix, who had been raised in the Modena court during their childhood.

However, Francis V's testamentary clauses were accepted, and Franz Ferdinand was able to take possession of the inheritance, assuming the name Austria-Este, even though he was not descended from the last of the Este family, Duchess Maria Beatrice. In 1896, he also became heir presumptive to Austria-Hungary and, according to the terms of the secundogeniture, he was not allowed to combine this inheritance with that of the Habsburg-Este. However, he was assassinated on 28 June 1914, in Sarajevo before becoming Emperor. Since Franz Ferdinand's children were born in morganatic marriage (see House of Hohenberg), and had thus no dynastic rights, on 31 October 1914 Emperor Franz Joseph bestowed the Austria-Este inheritance and titles upon Franz Ferdinand's nephew and legal heir, and now also heir to the throne, Archduke Charles: the issue of secundogeniture was evidently put aside for the time being, awaiting a possible enlargement of the young Archduke's progeny, which at the time was limited to just one son. Upon Franz Joseph's death in 1916, Archduke Charles ascended to the imperial throne with the name Charles I, and, on 16 April 1917, as head of the House of Habsburg, he issued letters patent conferring the name, arms and patrimony of Austria-Este on his second son, born meanwhile in 1915, Archduke Robert and his future issue according to masculine primogeniture. Through his mother Zita of Bourbon-Parma (she was a great-granddaughter of, as mentioned above, Maria Teresa of Savoy), Robert coincidentally descended from Maria Beatrice of Este, and thus the blood of Este family was also reunited with the name Austria-Este.

=== Post-World Wars ===
Archduke Robert's eldest daughter, Maria Beatrice, married Count Riprand of Arco-Zinneberg, a great-grandson on the mother's side of Maria Theresa, Queen of Bavaria, granddaughter of the duke Francis IV, as well as a descendant on the father's side of the latter's sister, Archduchess Maria Leopoldine, Countes of Arco and former Electress consort of Bavaria. On Robert's death his eldest son, Archduke Lorenz, born 1955, by his wife, Princess Margherita of Savoy, succeeded him in that role. He is married to Princess Astrid of Belgium, a daughter of King Albert II of Belgium. Since the throne of Belgium is heritable by females (and males no longer have precedence over females), Princess Astrid is an heir of Belgium immediately after the issue of King Philippe of Belgium. As such, her husband Archduke Lorenz of Austria-Este, was in 1995 elevated to the additional title of Prince of Belgium. The children of the couple are, since 1991, titled Archduke (Archduchess) of Austria and Prince(ss) of Belgium. The eldest of these is Prince Amedeo of Belgium, Archduke of Austria, born 1986.

== Family Tree ==
Lorraine | Habsburg | Este | Cybo
Franz I Holy Roman Emperor (1708–1765) | Maria Theresia; Archduchess of Austria (1717–1780) | Ercole III; Duke of Modena (1727–1803) | Maria Teresa; Duchess of Massa (1725–1790)
Leopold II; Holy Roman Emperor (1747–1792) | Ferdinand Karl; Archduke of Austria-Este (1754–1806) | Maria Beatrice; Duchess of Massa (1750–1829)
Savoy
Franz II; Holy Roman Emperor (1768–1835) | Francesco IV; Duke of Modena (1779–1846) | Maria Teresa; Queen of Sardinia (1773–1832) | Vittorio Emanuele I King of Sardinia (1759–1824)
Bourbon-Parma
Franz Karl; Archduke of Austria (1802–1878) | Maria Beatrice; Duchess of Modena (1792–1840) | Maria Teresa; Duchess of Parma (1803–1879) | Carlo II; Duke of Parma (1799–1883)
Karl Ludwig; Archduke of Austria (1833–1896) | Francesco V Duke of Modena (1819–1875) | Ferdinand Karl; Archduke of Austria-Este (1821–1849) | Maria Beatrix; Archduchess of Austria-Este (1824–1906) | Carlo III; Duke of Parma (1823–1854)
Bourbon
Franz Ferdinand; Archduke of Austria-Este (1863–1914) | Otto Franz Joseph; Archduke of Austria (1865–1906) | Marie Therese; Queen of Bavaria (1849–1919) | Roberto; Duke of Parma (1848–1907)
Hohenberg | Wittelsbach
Karl; Emperor of Austria (1887–1922) | Zita; Empress of Austria (1892–1989)
Robert; Archduke of Austria-Este (1915–1996)
Maria Beatrice (1954) | Lorenz; Prince of Belgium (1955) | Gerhard (1957) | Martin (1959) | Isabella (1963)
Arco-Zinneberg | Czarnocki-Lucheschi
Amedeo; Prince of Belgium (1986) | Maria Laura; Princess of Belgium (1988) | Joachim; Prince of Belgium (1991) | Luisa Maria; Princess of Belgium (1995) | Laetitia; Princess of Belgium (2003) | Bartholomaeus (2006) | Emmanuel (2008) | Helene (2009) | Luigi (2011)
Isvy
Anna Astrid; Princess of Belgium (2016) | Maximilian; Prince of Belgium (2019) | Alix; Princess of Belgium (2023)

== Coat of arms ==
Ferdinand Karl, Archduke of Austria-Este

Francesco IV, Duke of Modena and Archduke of Austria-Este

Francesco V, Duke of Modena and Archduke of Austria-Este

Franz Ferdinand, Archduke of Austria-Este

Robert, Archduke of Austria-Este

Lorenz, Prince of Belgium and Archduke of Austria-Este

== See also ==
- Duke of Ferrara and of Modena
