= Francis IV of Modena =

Duke of Modena and Reggio from 1814 to 1846

Francis IV
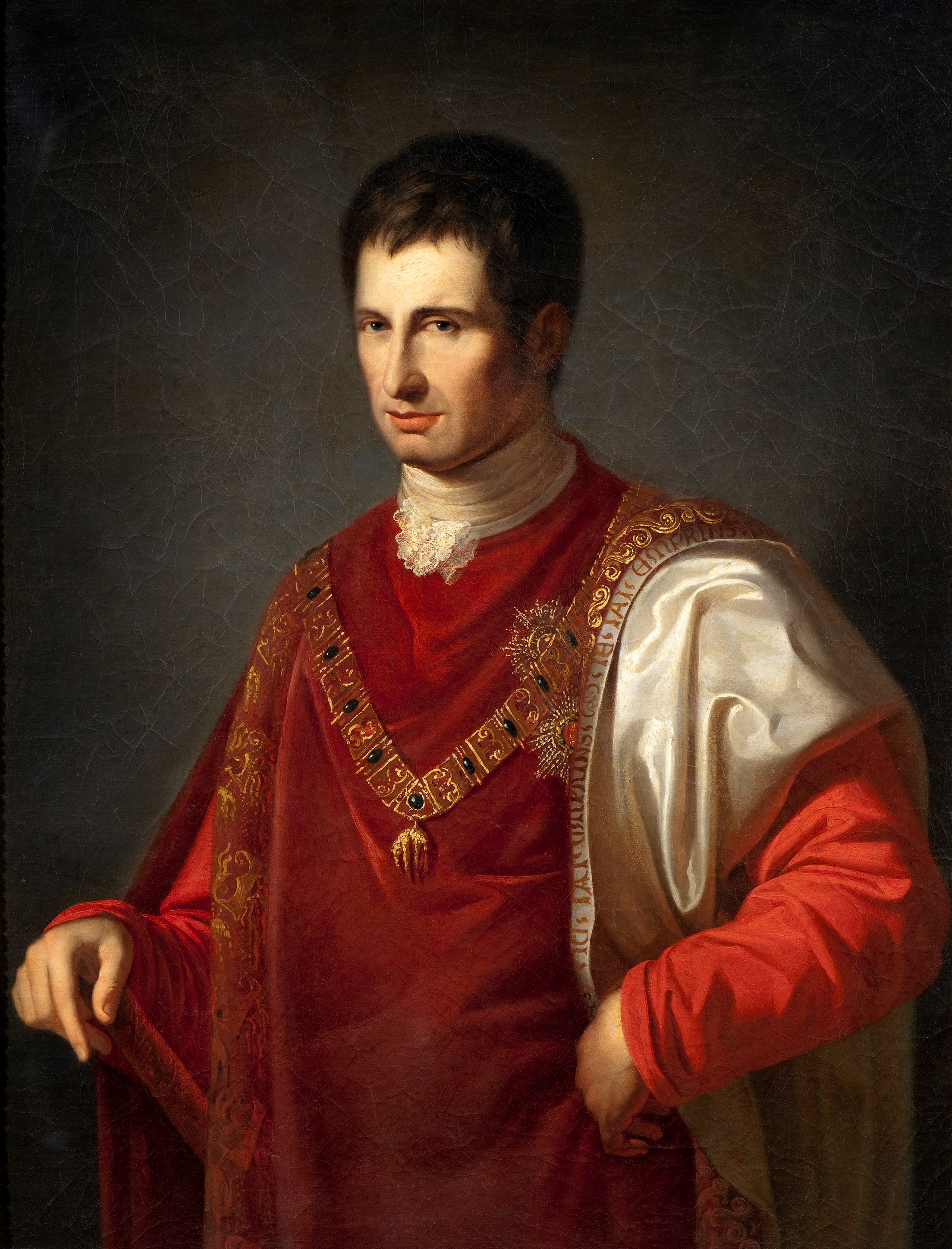
- Portrait by Adeodato Malatesta, 1831

Duke of Modena and Reggio
- Reign: 14 July 1814 – 21 January 1846
- Predecessor: Ercole III d'Este, Duke of Modena
- Successor: Francis V, Duke of Modena

Duke of Massa and Prince of Carrara
- Reign: 1829–1836
- Predecessor: Maria Beatrice d'Este
- Successor: Annexed by the Duchy of Modena and Reggio
- Born: 6 October 1779; Milan, Duchy of Milan
- Died: 21 January 1846 (aged 66); Modena, Duchy of Modena
- Spouse: Maria Beatrice of Savoy (m. 1812; died 1840)
- Issue: Maria Theresa, Countess of Chambord; Francis V, Duke of Modena; Archduke Ferdinand Karl Viktor; Maria Beatrix, Countess of Montizón
Names
- Francis Joseph Charles Ambrose Stanislaus; Italian: Francesco Giuseppe Carlo Ambrogio Stanislao; German: Franz Joseph Karl Ambrosius Stanislaus
- House: Habsburg-Este
- Father: Ferdinand Karl, Archduke of Austria-Este
- Mother: Maria Beatrice d'Este, Duchess of Massa
- Religion: Roman Catholicism

Francis IV Joseph Charles Ambrose Stanislaus (Italian: Francesco IV Giuseppe Carlo Ambrogio Stanislao d'Asburgo-Este; 6 October 1779 – 21 January 1846) was Duke of Modena, Reggio, and Mirandola (from 1815), Duke of Massa and Prince of Carrara (from 1829), Archduke of Austria-Este, Royal Prince of Hungary and Bohemia, Knight of the Order of the Golden Fleece.

== Biography ==
Francis was born in Milan. His father was Ferdinand Karl, Archduke of Austria-Este and Duke of Breisgau, his mother Maria Beatrice d'Este, Duchess of Massa and Princess of Carrara, who was the last descendant of the House of Este and, through her mother, of the House of Cybo-Malaspina.

He was a grandson of Maria Theresa of Austria, head of the House of Habsburg, and was heir to the Este states through his father, who had been invested with the succession in the imperial fies of the Este by the Perpetual Imperial Diet in 1771, just before his marriage to Maria Beatrice, although he could never actually ascend the throne during the Napoleonic era. Francis's mother was not entitled to inherit due to the Salic law in force in Modena and Reggio (but not applied in Massa and Carrara). He thus became the first member of the House of Habsburg-Este to rule the Este inheritance in Northern Italy.

Francis is distinguished for his stern and tyrannic rule by which he repressed all the democratic movements appearing during his reign, particularly following a major revolt in 1830. The harshness of the Ducal policies are illustrated by the hanging of Ciro Menotti for an attempted insurrection against the Duke (1831).

=== Family ===
In 1812, Francis married his niece the Princess Maria Beatrice of Savoy, who was the daughter of his sister Archduchess Maria Teresa of Austria-Este and King Victor Emmanuel I of Sardinia. The couple had four children:

- Maria Theresa (1817–1886), married Henri, comte de Chambord.
- Francis V, Duke of Modena (1819–1875), married Princess Adelgunde of Bavaria.
- Ferdinand Karl (1821–1849), married Archduchess Elisabeth Franziska of Austria. Father of Maria Theresia, Archduchess of Austria-Este.
- Maria Beatrix (1824–1906), married Infante Juan de Bourbon, Count of Montizón.

== Ancestry ==
Ancestors of Francis IV of Modena

8. Leopold, Duke of Lorraine
4. Francis I, Holy Roman Emperor
9. Élisabeth Charlotte of Orléans
2. Ferdinand Karl, Archduke of Austria-Este
10. Charles VI, Holy Roman Emperor
5. Maria Theresa of Austria
11. Elisabeth Christine of Brunswick
1. Francis IV, Duke of Modena
12. Francesco III d'Este, Duke of Modena
6. Ercole III d'Este, Duke of Modena
13. Charlotte Aglaé of Orléans
3. Maria Beatrice d'Este, Duchess of Massa
14. Alderano I Cybo-Malaspina, Duke of Massa
7. Maria Teresa Cybo-Malaspina, Duchess of Massa
15. Ricciarda Gonzaga

== See also ==
- Duke of Ferrara and of Modena
- House of Este
- Modena

Francis IV of Modena House of Austria-Este Cadet branch of the House of Habsburg-Lorraine Born: 6 October 1779 Died: 21 January 1846
Regnal titles
Preceded by Ferdinand Karl	Archduke of Austria-Este; 1806–1846	Succeeded by Francis V
Vacant Kingdom of Italy Title last held by Ercole III	Duke of Modena and Reggio; 1814–1846	Succeeded by Francis V
Titles in pretence
Preceded by Maria Theresa of Austria-Este	— TITULAR — Prince consort of England, Scotland and Ireland; 1824-1840; Reason for succession failure: Glorious Revolution	Vacant Title next held by Princess Adelgunde of Bavaria
