= Maria Beatrice of Savoy =

Duchess of Modena and Reggio from 1814 to 1840

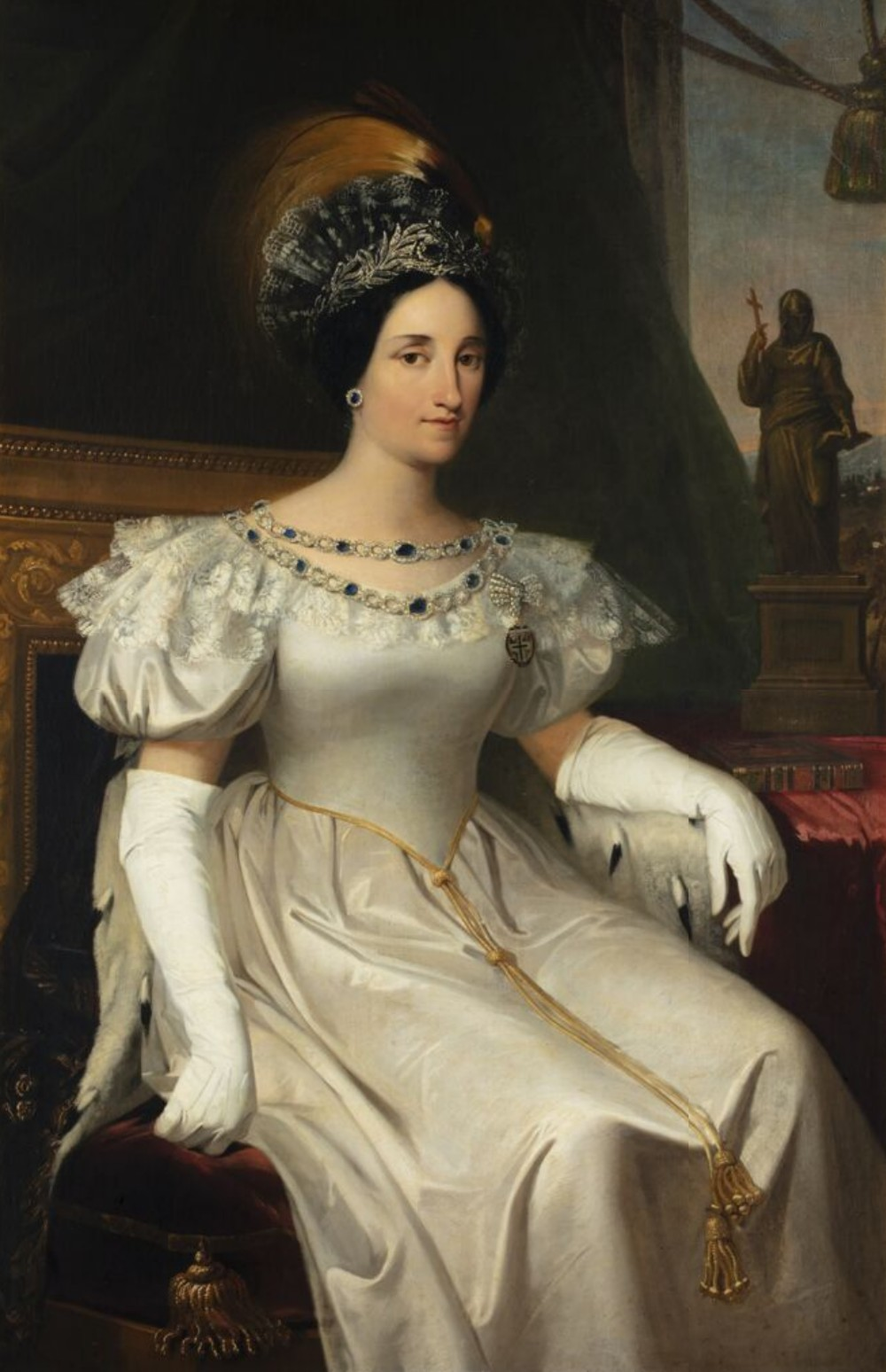
- Portrait by Adeodato Malatesta, 1836

Duchess consort of Modena and Reggio
- Tenure: 14 July 1814 – 15 September 1840
- Born: 6 December 1792; Turin, Piedmont-Sardinia
- Died: 15 September 1840 (aged 47); Castello del Catajo, Lombardy-Venetia
- Spouse: Francis IV, Duke of Modena (m. 1812)
- Issue: Maria Theresa, Countess of Chambord; Francis V, Duke of Modena; Archduke Ferdinand Karl Viktor; Maria Beatrix, Countess of Montizón
Names
- Italian: Maria Beatrice Vittoria Giuseppina
- House: Savoy
- Father: Victor Emmanuel I of Sardinia
- Mother: Maria Theresa of Austria-Este
- Religion: Roman Catholicism

Maria Beatrice of Savoy (Maria Beatrice Vittoria Giuseppina; 6 December 1792 – 15 September 1840) was Duchess of Modena by marriage to Francis IV, Duke of Modena.

== Biography ==
=== Early life ===
Maria Beatrice was born on 6 December 1792 in Turin. She was the eldest daughter of Victor Emmanuel, Duke of Aosta, and his wife Maria Teresa of Austria-Este. Her father became King of Sardinia unexpectedly in 1802 when Charles Emmanuel IV abdicated.

Her maternal grandparents were Ferdinand Karl, Archduke of Austria-Este and Maria Beatrice d'Este, Duchess of Massa. Ferdinand was the third son of Francis I, Holy Roman Emperor, and Maria Theresa of Austria. Maria Beatrice was the eldest daughter of Ercole III d'Este and Maria Theresa, Princess of Carrara.

In December 1798, Maria Beatrice left Turin with her parents and uncles to escape the French Revolutionary and Napoleonic Wars. They fled to Parma, then to Florence, and finally settled in Sardinia, the last dominion held by Kingdom of Sardinia. Maria Beatrice spent most of her time at Cagliari in the following thirteen years.

=== Marriage ===
On 20 June 1812, Maria Beatrice married her maternal uncle Francis, Archduke of Austria-Este. Due to their close relation, a special dispensation was received for their marriage from Pope Pius VII.

The couple left Sardinia on 15 July 1813 for Zakynthos, and then sailed to Trieste off the east shore of Adriatic Sea, finally reaching Vienna by land.

=== Duchess of Modena ===
In 1814, Maria Beatrice's husband became Francis IV, Duke of Modena, Reggio, and Mirandola on 14 July 1814, thereby elevating Maria Beatrice to the rank of duchess of Modena. On the invasion of Joachim Murat during the Hundred Days, they fled Modena until 15 May 1815.

On the outbreak of revolution, Maria Beatrice had to flee Modena again with her family on 5 February 1831, but with Austrian military assistance the ducal family was able to return within a year.

Maria Beatrice died of a heart condition on 15 September 1840 at Castello del Catajo. Her remains were kept in the Church of San Vincenzo, Modena. She was a Lady of the Austrian Order of the Starry Cross.

=== Jacobite claims ===
Through her father, she inherited the Jacobite claim to the thrones of England, Scotland, and Ireland, but like other non-Stuart pretenders, she never asserted her claim. Had she gained the throne she would have been Mary II or III & II. (Note: Maria Beatrice (Mary III & II) and her granddaughter Maria Theresa of Austria-Este (Mary IV & III) were numbered in such a way because some Jacobites regard Elizabeth I of England as illegitimate, and therefore consider Mary, Queen of Scots, to have been the rightful Queen Mary II of England from the death of Mary I)

== Issue ==
Her marriage had four children:

- Maria Theresa, Archduchess of Austria-Este (14 July 1817 – 25 March 1886), married Henri, Count of Chambord.
- Francis V, Duke of Modena (1 June 1819 – 20 November 1875), married Princess Adelgunde of Bavaria.
- Ferdinand Karl Viktor, Archduke of Austria-Este (20 July 1821 – 15 December 1849), married Archduchess Elisabeth Franziska of Austria (daughter of Archduke Josef Anton of Austria and his third wife Duchess Maria Dorothea of Württemberg).
- Archduchess Maria Beatrix of Austria-Este (13 February 1824 – 18 March 1906), married Juan, Count of Montizón.

== Ancestry ==
Ancestors of Maria Beatrice of Savoy

16. Victor Amadeus II of Sardinia
8. Charles Emmanuel III of Sardinia
17. Anne Marie d'Orléans
4. Victor Amadeus III of Sardinia
18. Ernest Leopold, Landgrave of Hesse-Rotenburg
9. Polyxena of Hesse-Rotenburg
19. Eleonore of Löwenstein-Wertheim
2. Victor Emmanuel I of Sardinia
20. Louis, Grand Dauphin
10. Philip V of Spain
21. Maria Anna Victoria of Bavaria
5. Maria Antonietta of Spain
22. Odoardo Farnese, Hereditary Prince of Parma
11. Elisabeth Farnese
23. Dorothea Sophie of Neuburg
1. Maria Beatrice of Savoy
24. Leopold, Duke of Lorraine
12. Francis I, Holy Roman Emperor
25. Élisabeth Charlotte d'Orléans
6. Archduke Ferdinand of Austria-Este
26. Charles VI, Holy Roman Emperor
13. Maria Theresa of Austria
27. Elisabeth Christine of Brunswick-Wolfenbüttel
3. Maria Theresa of Austria-Este
28. Francesco III d'Este, Duke of Modena
14. Ercole III d'Este, Duke of Modena
29. Charlotte Aglaé d'Orléans
7. Maria Beatrice Ricciarda d'Este
30. Alderano I Cybo-Malaspina, Duke of Massa
15. Maria Teresa Cybo-Malaspina
31. Ricciarda Gonzaga

== Notes ==
Maria Beatrice of Savoy House of Savoy Born: 6 December 1792 Died: 15 September 1840
Titles in pretence
Preceded by Victor Emmanuel I of Sardinia	— TITULAR — Queen of England, Scotland and Ireland; 1824–1840; Reason for succession failure: Glorious Revolution	Succeeded by Francis V of Modena
