= Maria Theresa of Austria-Este, Queen of Sardinia =

Queen of Sardinia from 1802 to 1821

Maria Theresa
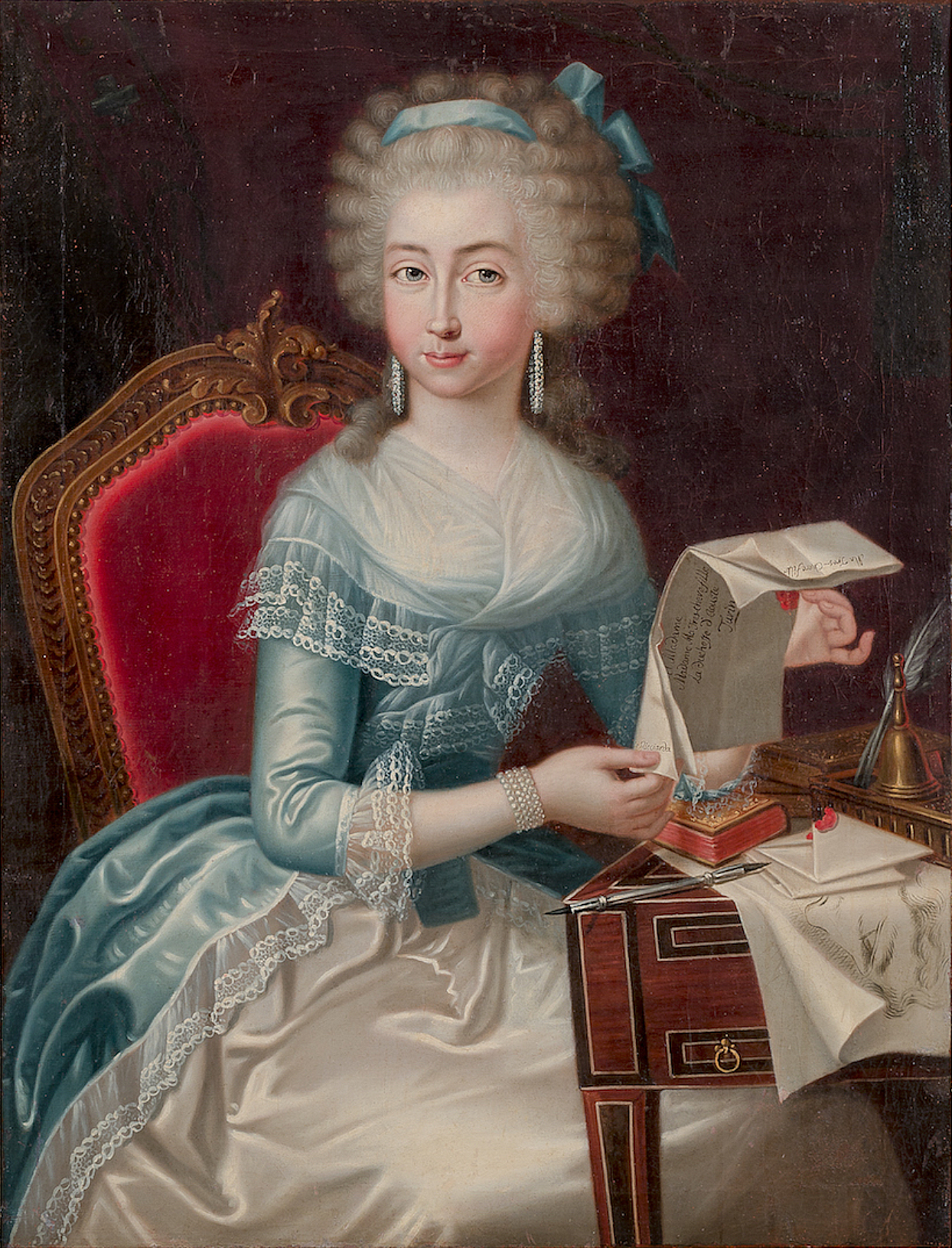
- Portrait of Maria Theresa, c. 1789

Queen consort of Sardinia
- Tenure: 4 June 1802 – 12 March 1821
- Born: 1 November 1773; Royal Palace of Milan, Milan, Duchy of Milan
- Died: 29 March 1832 (aged 58); Geneva, Switzerland
- Burial: Basilica of Superga, Turin
- Spouse: Victor Emmanuel I of Sardinia (m. 1789; died 1824)
- Issue among others...: Maria Beatrice, Duchess of Modena; Maria Teresa, Duchess of Parma; Maria Anna, Empress of Austria; Maria Cristina, Queen of the Two Sicilies
Names
- Maria Theresia Josefa Johanna
- House: Austria-Este
- Father: Ferdinand Karl, Archduke of Austria-Este
- Mother: Maria Beatrice d'Este, Duchess of Massa
- Religion: Roman Catholicism

Maria Theresa of Austria-Este (German: Maria Theresia Josefa Johanna; 1 November 1773 – 29 March 1832) was Queen of Sardinia as the wife of Victor Emmanuel I of Sardinia. She was born an archduchess of Austria-Este and a princess of Modena as the daughter of Ferdinand Karl, Archduke of Austria-Este, and Maria Beatrice d'Este, Duchess of Massa. Her husband’s reign as King of Sardinia ended in abdication in 1821, when he elected his brother Charles Felix king after a liberal revolution, during which Victor Emmanuel proved unwilling to accept a liberal constitution. She was a part of the then newly-founded House of Austria-Este.

== Early life ==
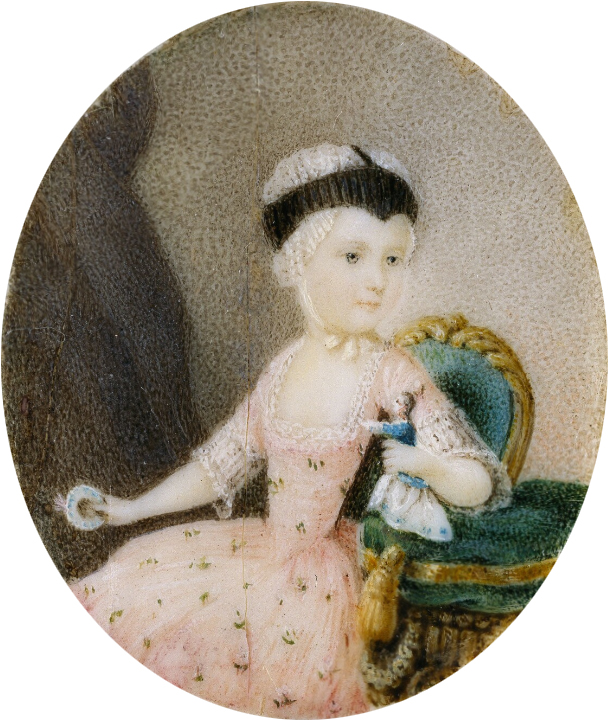
Maria Theresa as a child

Maria Theresa was born on 1 November 1773 at the Royal Palace of Milan in Milan. She was the second child and first daughter of Archduke Ferdinand Karl of Austria, governor of Milan, and Maria Beatrice d'Este, heir to the Duchy of Modena. She was named after her paternal grandmother, Empress Maria Theresa, as all eldest granddaughters of the empress were. Maria Theresa had one older brother, Josef Franz, but he died in infancy in 1772 before she was born.

The Duke of Aosta, Victor Emmanuel, was still unmarried when he reached the age of twenty-nine. This was rare for royalty during the 18th century and was considered late by standards of the time. The choice for the royal bride fell on Maria Theresa. A lot of information had been gathered regarding the appearance, personality and manners about the princess before her marriage.

== Marriage ==
Maria Theresa was married by proxy on 29 June 1788 in Milan. Finally, on 25 April 1789, she married the 29-year-old Victor Emmanuel, Duke of Aosta, in person in Novara. She was 15 years old. Their relationship was described as a happy and harmonious one, and Victor Emmanuel spent ample time with their children. They had seven children, four of whom survived into adulthood.

=== Beginnings at the Savoyard court ===
Maria Theresa became a good friend of Clotilde of France, the childless consort of Charles Emmanuel, Prince of Piedmont. She was also close to the Duchess of Chablais. At the time of her marriage, her spouse was the Duke of Aosta. As such, she was styled as Her Royal Highness the Duchess of Aosta until she became queen. The couple had six daughters and one son, who died young. Upon the invasion of Piedmont by Napoleon Bonaparte in 1798, she left with her family first to Tuscany and then to Sardinia.

== Queen ==
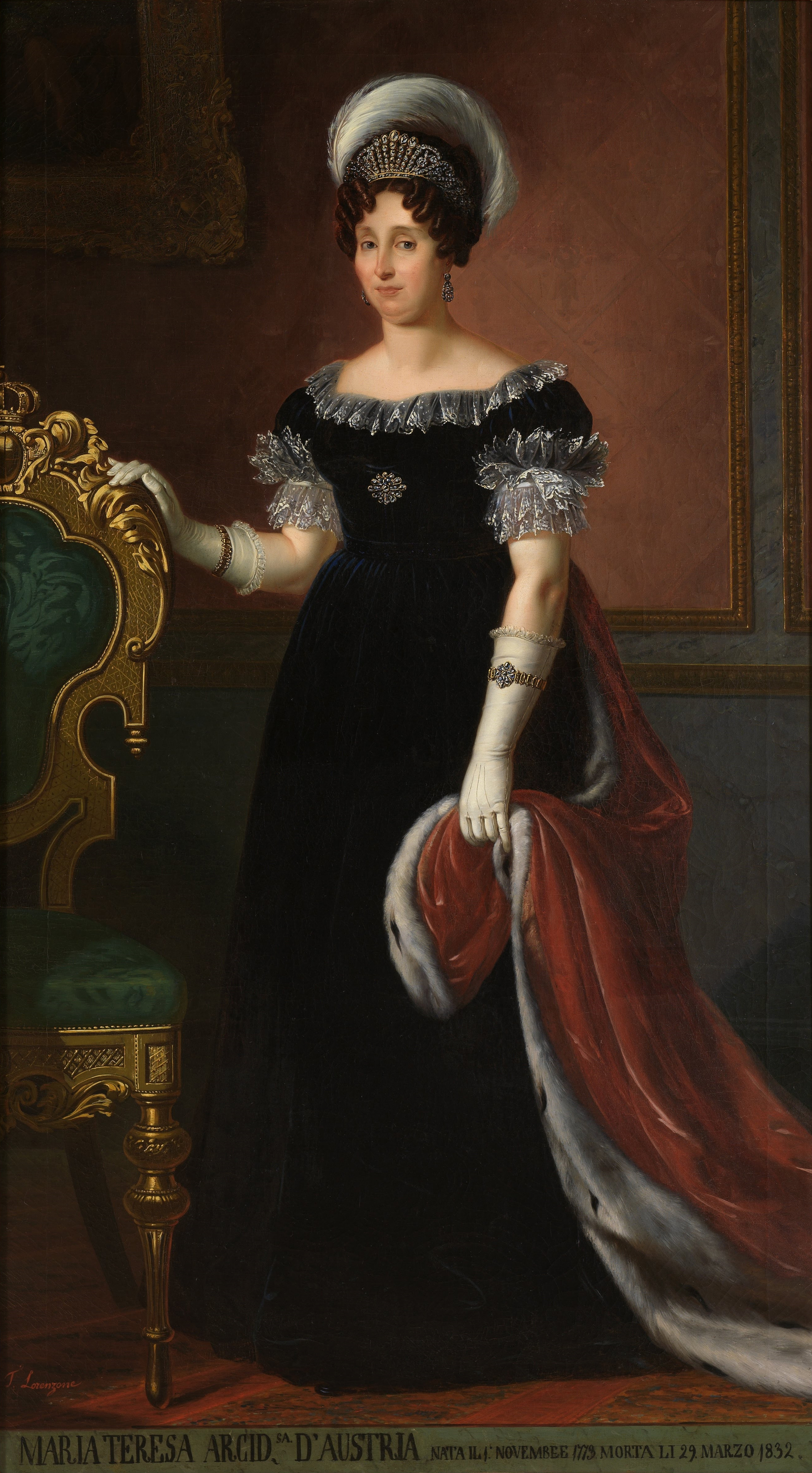
Maria Theresa as Queen of Sardinia (posthumous portrait by Tommaso Lorenzone, mid-19th century)

After the abdication of Charles Emmanuel IV in 1802, her husband succeeded to the throne as the new King of Sardinia, with Maria Theresa becoming his Queen consort. However, due the ongoing war, she had to wait on the island of Sardinia for the end of the war in 1814 to return to the capital Turin.

Maria Theresa was initially enthusiastically welcomed in Turin, but she soon aroused great discontent among the public. She was accused of wishing to undermine and abolish so much as possible of the reforms initiated during the French occupation, and was additionally said to treat all whom cooperated with the French with contempt. Her conduct has been suggested as one of the reasons behind the discontent which led to the rebellions of 1821 which led to her consort's abdication. After the outbreak of a liberal revolution in 1821, her husband Victor Emmanuel abdicated in favor of his brother, Charles Felix. During the riots, she declared herself willing to assume regency if necessary. Instead, she followed her abdicated spouse to Nice.

Maria Theresa survived Victor Emmanuel by eight years. She was accused of having tried to convince her childless brother-in-law Charles Felix to assign Francis IV, Duke of Modena (her brother and the husband of her eldest daughter Maria Beatrice), as heir to the throne. Due to the hostility directed toward her, she was not allowed to return to Turin until 1831. She was buried in the Basilica of Superga.

A daybed that belonged to Maria Theresa is held at the Attingham Park.

== Issue ==
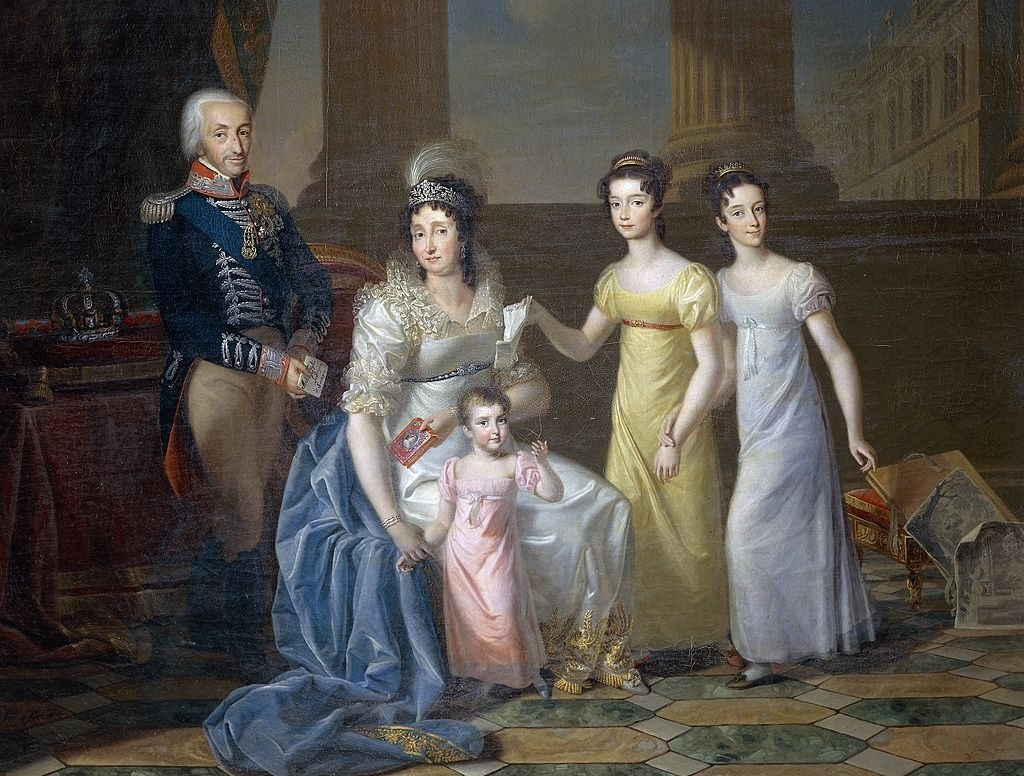
Maria Theresa with her husband and their daughters Maria Anna, Maria Teresa and Maria Cristina.

1. Princess Maria Beatrice Vittoria Josepha of Savoy (6 December 1792 – 15 September 1840); married Francis IV, Duke of Modena. They had four children. She became the Duchess of Modena.
2. Princess Maria Adelaide Clothilde Xaveria Borbonia of Savoy (1 October 1794 – 9 March 1802); died in childhood.
3. Prince Charles Emmanuel of Savoy (3 September 1796 – 9 August 1799); died in childhood due to smallpox.
4. A daughter (13 November 1800 – 10 January 1801); died in infancy.
5. Princess Maria Teresa Fernanda Felicitas Gaetana Pia of Savoy (19 September 1803 – 16 July 1879); married Charles II, Duke of Parma. They had two children, including Charles III, Duke of Parma. She became Duchess of Parma and Piacenza, and Duchess of Lucca.
6. Princess Maria Anna Ricciarda Carolina Margherita Pia of Savoy (19 September 1803 – 4 May 1884); married Ferdinand I of Austria, no issue. She became Empress of Austria and Queen of Hungary, among other titles.
7. Princess Maria Cristina Carlotta Giuseppina Gaetana Elise of Savoy (14 November 1812 – 21 January 1836); married Ferdinand II of the Two Sicilies. They had one child, Francis II of the Two Sicilies. She became Queen of the Two Sicilies.

== Ancestry ==
Ancestors of Maria Theresa of Austria-Este, Queen of Sardinia

8. Leopold, Duke of Lorraine
4. Francis I, Holy Roman Emperor
9. Élisabeth Charlotte d'Orléans
2. Ferdinand Karl, Archduke of Austria-Este
10. Charles VI, Holy Roman Emperor
5. Maria Theresa, Queen of Hungary
11. Elisabeth Christine of Brunswick-Wolfenbüttel
1. Maria Theresa of Austria-Este
12. Francesco III d'Este, Duke of Modena
6. Ercole III d'Este, Duke of Modena
13. Charlotte Aglaé d'Orléans
3. Maria Beatrice d'Este, Duchess of Massa
14. Alderano I Cybo-Malaspina, Duke of Massa
7. Maria Teresa Cybo-Malaspina, Duchess of Massa
15. Ricciarda Gonzaga

Queen Maria Theresa Habsburg-Este Cadet branch of the House of Habsburg and House of Este Born: 1 November 1773 Died: 29 March 1832
Italian royalty
Vacant Title last held by Clotilde of France	Queen consort of Sardinia; 4 June 1802 – 12 March 1821	Succeeded by Maria Cristina of Naples and Sicily
Titles in pretence
Vacant Title last held by Princess Louise of Stolberg-Gedern	— TITULAR — Queen consort of England, Scotland and Ireland; 1819–1824; Reason for succession failure: Glorious Revolution	Succeeded by Francis IV, Duke of Modena as Prince consort
