= Maria Ludovika =

Maria Ludovika (also spelled Ludovica) may refer to:

- Maria Luisa of Spain (1747-1792), who was consort of Leopold II, Holy Roman Emperor from 1790 to 1792
- Maria Ludovika of Austria-Este (1787-1816)
