= Philipp Ferdinand von Grünne =

Austrian general

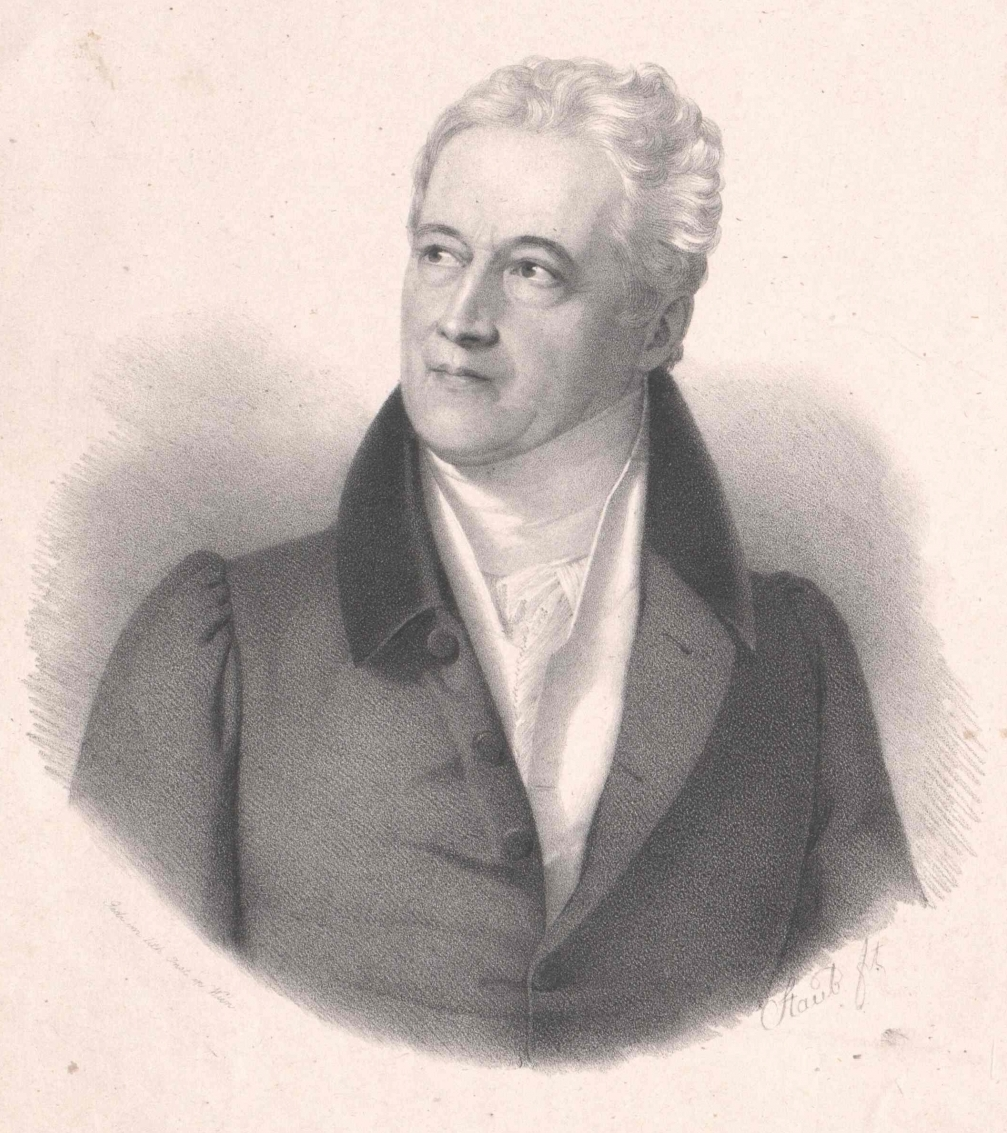
- Philipp Ferdinand von Grünne
- Born: 15 May 1762; Dresden, Electorate of Saxony
- Died: 26 January 1854 (aged 91) Vienna, Austrian Empire
- Allegiance: Habsburg monarchy Austrian Empire
- Branch: Cavalry
- Service years: 1782–1854
- Rank: General der Kavallerie
- Conflicts: Austro-Turkish War (1788–1791); French Revolutionary Wars; Flanders campaign (1794); Rhine Campaign of 1795; Italian-Swiss campaign (1799); Battle of Hohenlinden (1800); Napoleonic Wars; Battle of Caldiero (1805); Battle of Eckmühl (1809); Battle of Aspern-Essling (1809); Battle of Wagram (1809)
- Awards: Military Order of Maria Theresa; Order of Leopold; Order of Saint Januarius
- Other work: Inhaber, Uhlan Regiment Nr. 3

Philipp Ferdinand Graf von Grünne de Pinchard (15 May 1762 – 26 January 1854) was an Austrian general during the French Revolutionary Wars and the Napoleonic Wars. Born in the Electorate of Saxony, he joined the army of Habsburg Austria in 1782. Within 12 years he was appointed to serve on the staff of Francis II, Holy Roman Emperor. After serving as a staff officer, he led a cavalry regiment with distinction during the Italian and Swiss expedition of 1799. Promoted to general, Grünne led a brigade in the fall 1800 campaign. In 1804, he was selected to work closely with Archduke Charles, Duke of Teschen in implementing reforms in the Austrian army. He had an important role on Archduke Charles' staff in the 1805 and 1809 wars and oversaw Charles' household after the archduke retired from military service. Grünne was Inhaber of an Uhlan regiment from 1847 until his death.

== Early career ==
Philipp Ferdinand de Hemricourt de Mozet de Pinchard, Graf von Grünne was born on 15 May 1762 in Dresden in the Electorate of Saxony. He joined the Habsburg Austrian army in 1782 and fought in the Austro-Turkish War. He became an Imperial Chamberlain in 1791. He married Rosalie von Felz and his only son by the marriage was Karl Ludwig von Grünne (1808–1884). His son became a high-ranking general influential with Emperor Franz Joseph I of Austria.

== French Revolutionary Wars ==
Grünne was promoted major on 31 April 1792. He became an aide-de-camp to Holy Roman Emperor Francis II in 1794 while serving in the Low Countries theatre of the War of the First Coalition. During the Rhine Campaign of 1795, he was appointed Adjutant general to François Sébastien Charles Joseph de Croix, Count of Clerfayt and later to Dagobert Sigmund von Wurmser. He earned promotion to Oberstleutnant on 9 February 1795 and to Oberst (colonel) on 28 February 1797.

In 1799 during the War of the Second Coalition, Grünne led a cavalry regiment in the Italian-Swiss campaign. In a skirmish on 30 September, his troopers helped cover the retreat of Alexander Korsakov's Russian army after its defeat in the Second Battle of Zurich. On 6 March 1800, he was promoted to Generalmajor and defended the town of Kempten against the French in the summer campaign.

Grünne commanded a cavalry brigade at the Battle of Hohenlinden on 3 December 1800. The brigade was part of Prince Johann of Liechtenstein's cavalry division, which was assigned to Johann Kollowrat's Left-Center Column in the army of Archduke John of Austria. The brigade included the Hohenzollern Cuirassier Regiment Nr. 8 (strength not given), Ferdinand Hussar Regiment Nr. 3 (1,205), and 898 volunteer hussars. Because of poor Austrian coordination and French initiative, Kollowrat's column found itself assailed by French divisions under Michel Ney on their right, Emmanuel de Grouchy to their front, and Antoine Richepanse on their left. The troops of Kollowrat's column finally collapsed in panic and abandoned their cannons. Hohenlinden was a catastrophe in which the Austrian army lost 798 killed, 3,687 wounded, and 7,195 men and 50 guns captured. French casualties numbered about 3,000. Grünne received the Knight's Cross of the Military Order of Maria Theresa on 18 August 1801.

== Napoleonic Wars ==
=== 1805 war ===
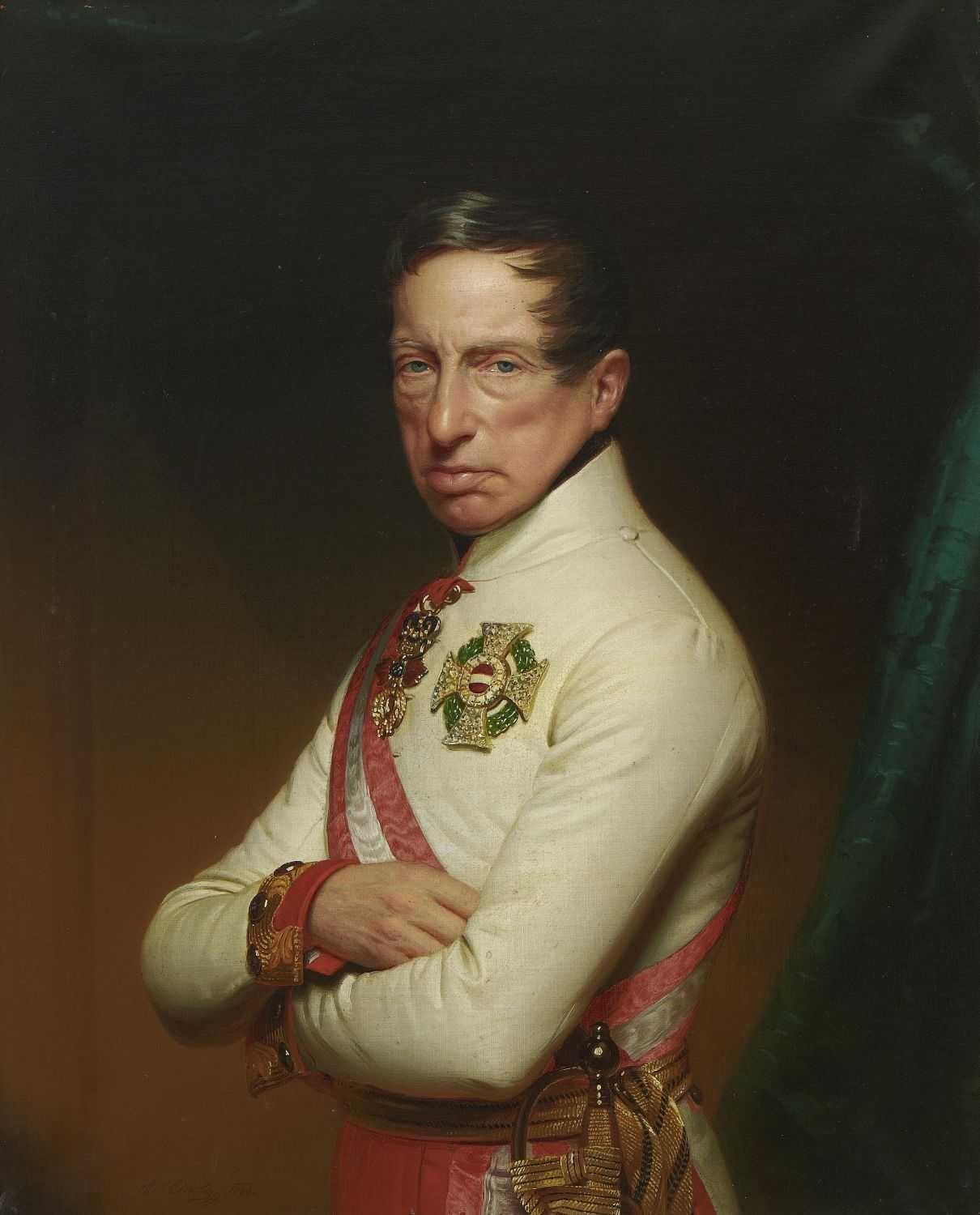
Archduke Charles

After Austria's defeat in the War of the Second Coalition, Archduke Charles emerged as the most successful Habsburg commander. Consequently, Emperor Francis II promoted Charles to Field Marshal and appointed him president of the Hofkriegsrat, the Imperial War Council, on 9 January 1801. During the period 1801–1805, Charles was mostly concerned with needed administrative reforms but neglected the army's combat readiness. Grünne, who was once a tutor to Charles, was appointed to be the archduke's military secretary at this time. The British envoy Arthur Paget worried about Grünne's "pacifist disposition and admiration of Bonaparte". In April 1805, a committee led by Grünne implemented a reorganization of Austria's cavalry. Each regiment was ordered to have eight squadrons, each made up of 131 men in the heavy cavalry and 151 men in the light cavalry. In addition, the cavalry was directed to fight in two deep order rather than three deep.

Before the War of the Third Coalition broke out, Archduke Charles warned that the army was not ready. However, he was overruled by Emperor Francis and the emperor's favorite, Karl Mack von Leiberich. Against the advice of Charles, but with the emperor's permission, Mack's army invaded Bavaria and advanced to Ulm. In October 1805, Mack's army was destroyed by Napoleon in the Ulm campaign. Charles' army held its own in the Battle of Caldiero, but the disaster at Ulm forced it to retreat from Italy. Grünne served as Charles' Adjutant general from September to December 1805 during the Italian campaign. On 2 December 1805, Napoleon crushed the Austro-Russian army at the Battle of Austerlitz, ending the Third Coalition and defeating Austria in humiliating fashion.

=== 1809 war ===
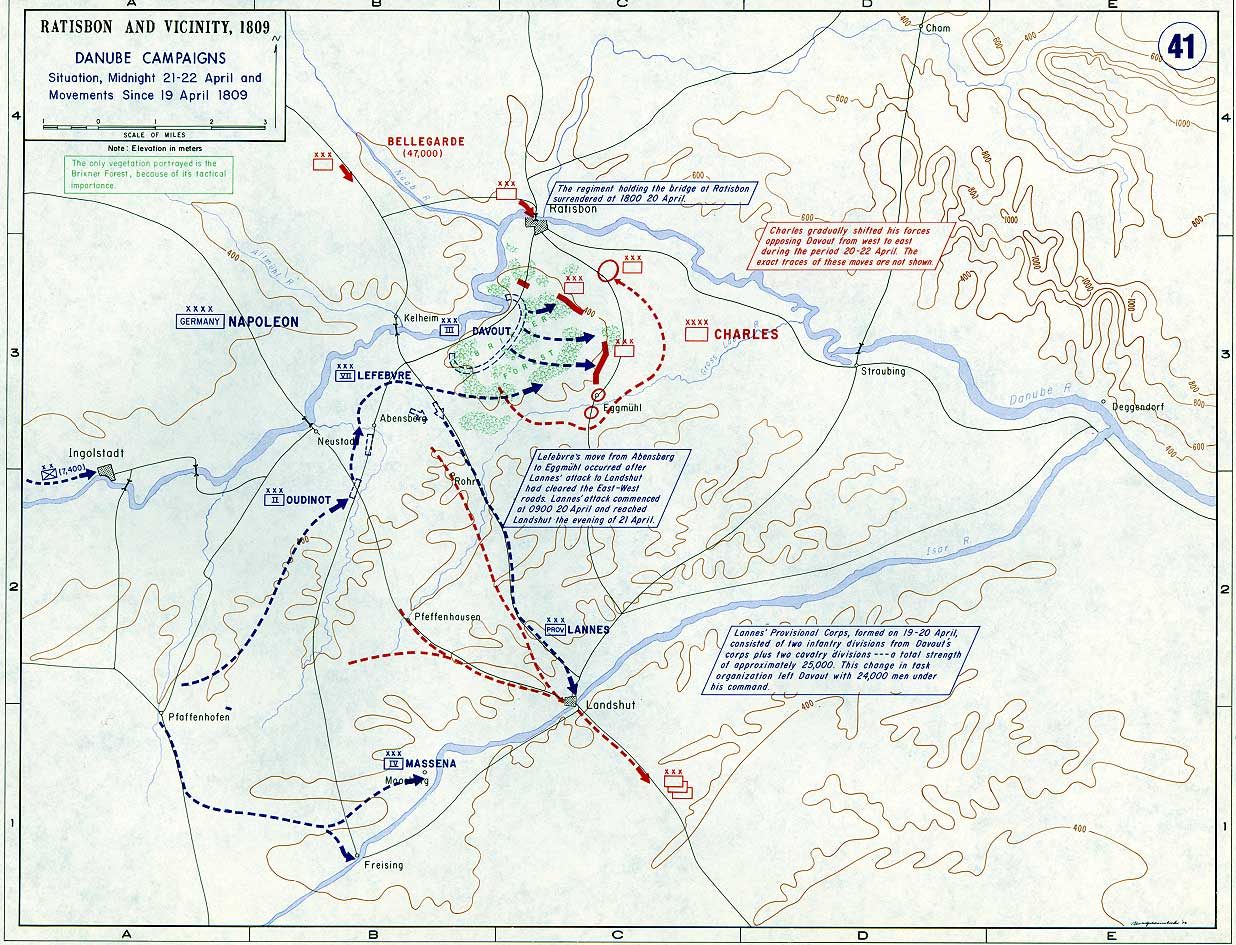
Battle of Eckmühl, 21 April 1809

In the aftermath, Archduke Charles selected Anton Mayer von Heldensfeld as his chief of staff. This was an unfortunate choice because Mayer was unstable and an intriguer, but even worse, Grünne and Mayer despised one another. On 10 February 1806, Emperor Francis reluctantly appointed Charles as Generalissimus in command of the Austrian army. However, the Hofkriegsrat was kept separate with Wenzel Joseph von Colloredo as its president. Grünne was appointed to head the General-Militärdirektion, or War Ministry, one of the four military departments of the Hofkriegsrat. It was rumored that there was a French agent somewhere in the system, but the spy was never found. At the time, some people believed the mole was Grünne, but historian Gunther E. Rothenberg wrote that it was unlikely. Grünne was promoted Feldmarschall-Leutnant on 22 January 1808.

Napoleon's invasion of Spain provoked the Dos de Mayo Uprising in 1808 and started the Peninsular War. With much of Napoleon's army committed to Spain, a pro-war faction emerged in Austria that included Empress Maria Ludovika of Austria-Este, Foreign Minister Johann Stadion, Archduke John and others. However, Emperor Francis, Archduke Charles, Archduke Joseph, and Grünne remained skeptical. Austria's French ambassador Klemens von Metternich claimed that Napoleon had only 206,000 troops available and that many were Germans and Poles of doubtful reliability. Metternich underestimated Napoleon's strength, but his influence convinced the government to go to war in 1809.

Mayer drew up a strategic plan in which seven corps assembled in northwestern Bohemia, two corps on the Inn River, two corps in Inner Austria, and one corps in Polish Galicia. Archduke Charles then changed his mind and wanted most of the corps transferred to the Inn. Mayer, who had been drinking heavily, forcefully argued for a March offensive but was overruled. Probably encouraged by Grünne, Charles obtained Mayer's dismissal and replacement by Johann Nepomuk von Prochaska. The movement of the bulk of the corps to the Inn took place. From February to July 1809, Grünne was the main army's Adjutant general.

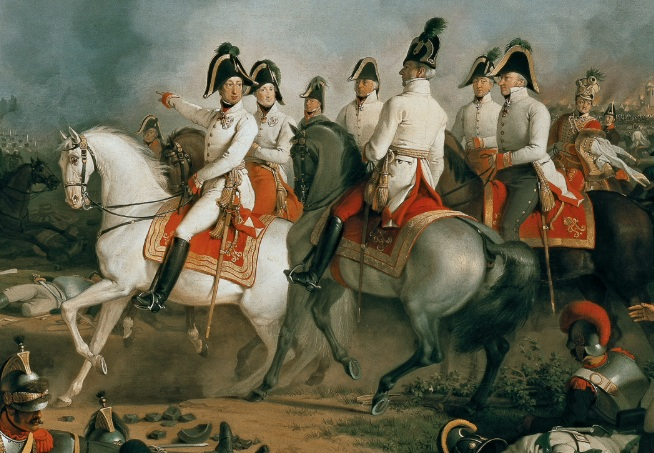
Detail from a painting by Johann Peter Krafft shows Archduke Charles and his staff at Aspern. Wimpffen is the somewhat portly fellow at right while Grünne seems to be the officer to the left of Wimpffen.

On 20 April, while the Austrian army maneuvered before the Battle of Eckmühl, Archduke Charles suffered a series of epileptic seizures. During this time, the army remained inert because Grünne and staff officer Maximilian von Wimpffen failed to carry out the army's operations. The Battle of Eckmühl on 22 April was a defeat but not a disaster. Nevertheless, it resulted in a long retreat and Napoleon's capture of Vienna. The archduke's orders, issued through Grünne, were "obscure or ambiguous" according to Rothenberg. Charles did not get along with his corps commanders and most of them did not like Grünne. Charles replaced his chief of staff Prochaska with Wimpffen.

Archduke Charles defeated Napoleon at the Battle of Aspern-Essling on 21–22 May 1809. On the second day, 85,000 Austrians outfought 50,000 French troops. Austrian losses were 4,010 killed, 14,999 wounded, and 681 captured. The French lost at least 20,000 killed and wounded plus 3,000 captured. At the Battle of Wagram on 5–6 July 1809, Napoleon defeated Charles by massing 130,800 infantry, 23,300 cavalry, and 544 guns against the Austrians' 113,834 infantry, 14,634 cavalry, and 414 guns. Again, losses on both sides were horrific. Grünne and Wimpffen were blamed for the defeat by compelling Charles to adopt an overly complex battle plan on the second day. Rothenberg asserted that Charles was at fault for issuing orders too late and failing to keep a reserve.

After another clash in the Battle of Znaim on 11 July 1809, in which the Austrians lost 6,200 casualties, Archduke Charles signed an armistice with Napoleon. This action enraged Emperor Francis and caused him to demote Charles and dismiss the unpopular Grünne. Soon after, Charles resigned; though disliked by his generals, Charles remained popular with the rank and file. Except for a brief period, Charles never again held an active command.

== Later career ==
After Archduke Charles retired, Grünne became the Grand Master of the archduke's household. He retained this position until Charles' death on 20 April 1847. In 1802, Grünne bought two estates in the Dobersberg area, but leased them out because of his military obligations. When he returned in 1810, the properties were in such a poor condition that he had to rebuild them. He bought a third estate at Peigarten in 1812. He spent considerable funds and energy redesigning the Dobersberg Castle park so that it became known as the most attractive park in the region.

Grünne was promoted General der Kavallerie on 2 November 1827. He served as Privy Councilor in 1836. He received the Order of Saint Januarius in 1839 and the Civil Order of Merit of the Bavarian Crown in 1844. He was awarded the Grand Cross of the Order of Leopold on 1 September 1847. He became the Inhaber of Uhlan Regiment Nr. 3 in 1847 and held the position until his death on 26 January 1854 in Vienna.

== Notes ==
Military offices
Preceded by Archduke Charles	Proprietor (Inhaber) of Uhlan Regiment Nr. 3; 1847–1854	Succeeded by Archduke Karl Ferdinand
