= Sant'Erasmo =

Island in Northern Italy

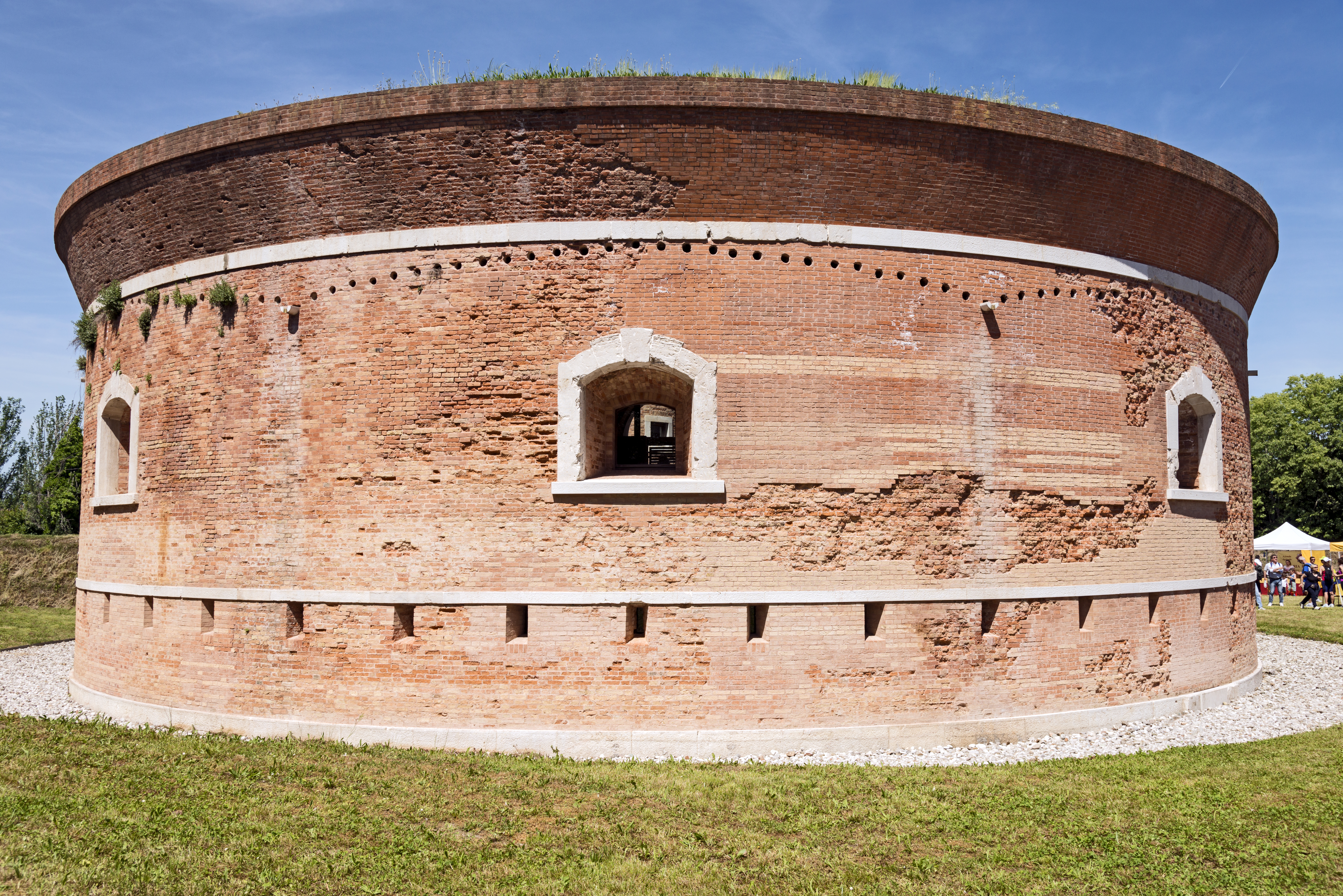
- The Fort of Maximillian

- Location within Venetian Lagoon

Geography
- Coordinates: 45°27′27″N 12°24′45″E
- Adjacent to: Venetian Lagoon

Administration
- Italy
- Comune: Venice

Sant'Erasmo is an island in the Venetian Lagoon lying north-east of the Lido island and east of Venice, Italy.

== History ==
The island was a port attached to Murano in the 8th century, but is now known for market gardening.

In the 14th century, a shipping canal next to the island habitually caused silting to the lagoon.

Ruined fortifications, including the so-called Torre Massimiliana (Tower of Maximilian), ring the isle. Forts existed in the island as early as the 16th century. After the fall of the Republic of Venice, the French built here a stronghold in 1811–1814. After Napoleon's defeat, the Austrian Archduke Maximilian of Austria-Este had a tower built here in 1843–1844, and also found here refuge during a revolt. The tower has a polygonal base of 25 m and is surrounded by a ditch. On the upper floor up to 13 cannons could be housed. It was used by the Italian Army as late as World War I.

== Today ==
An annual boat race takes place during the summer. Sant'Erasmo is also known for the waders on sand banks in the lagoon surrounding it. The beach on the island's Southernmost point, the Spiaggia del Bacan, is a popular summer destination with local Venetians. There is a 20th century church, a few restaurants and a guesthouse.

The island is accessed on Actv waterbus line 13 (Fondamente Nove-Murano-Vignole-Lazzaretto Nuovo-Sant'Erasmo-Treporti) and is also served by a night service.

== Gallery ==
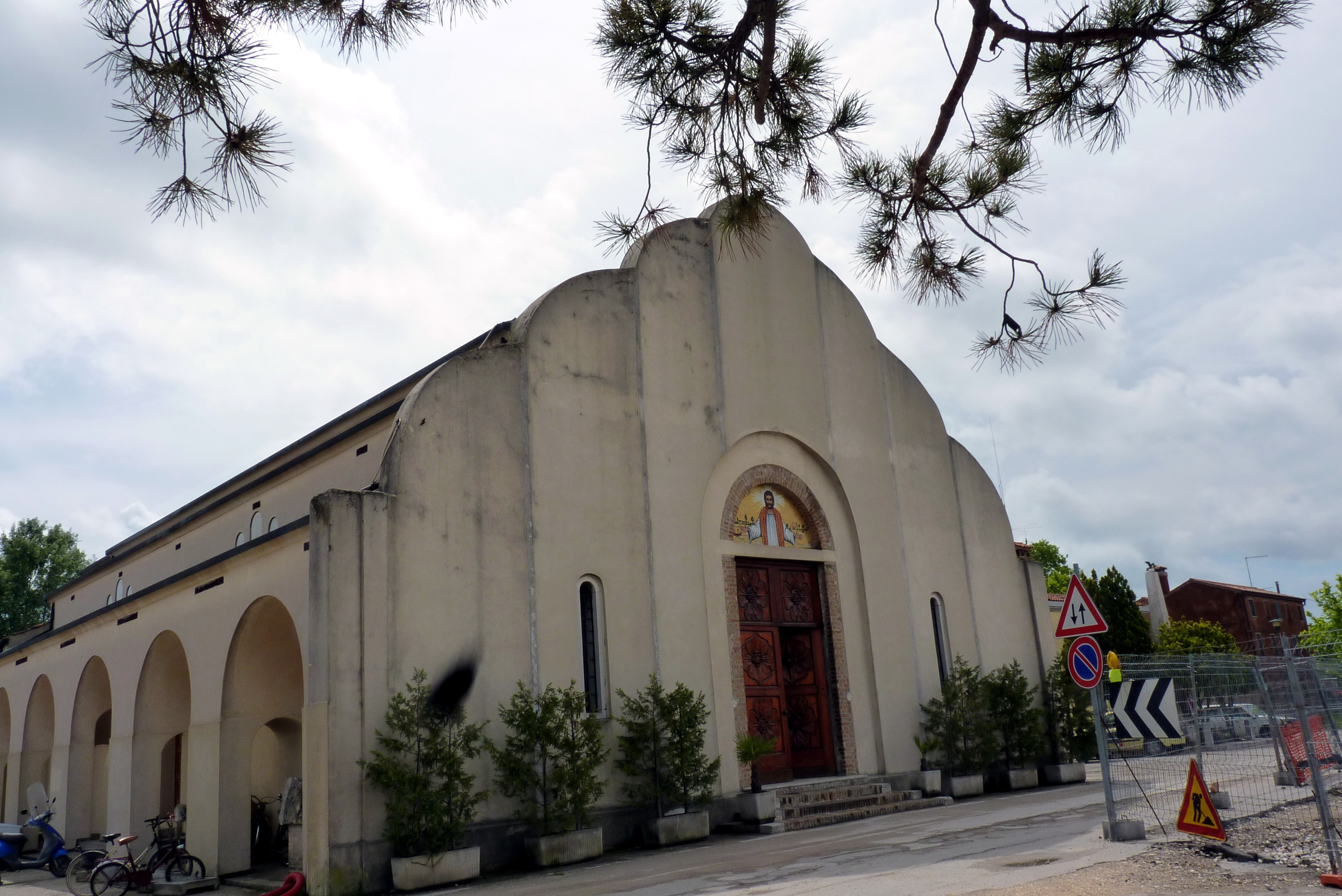
Church

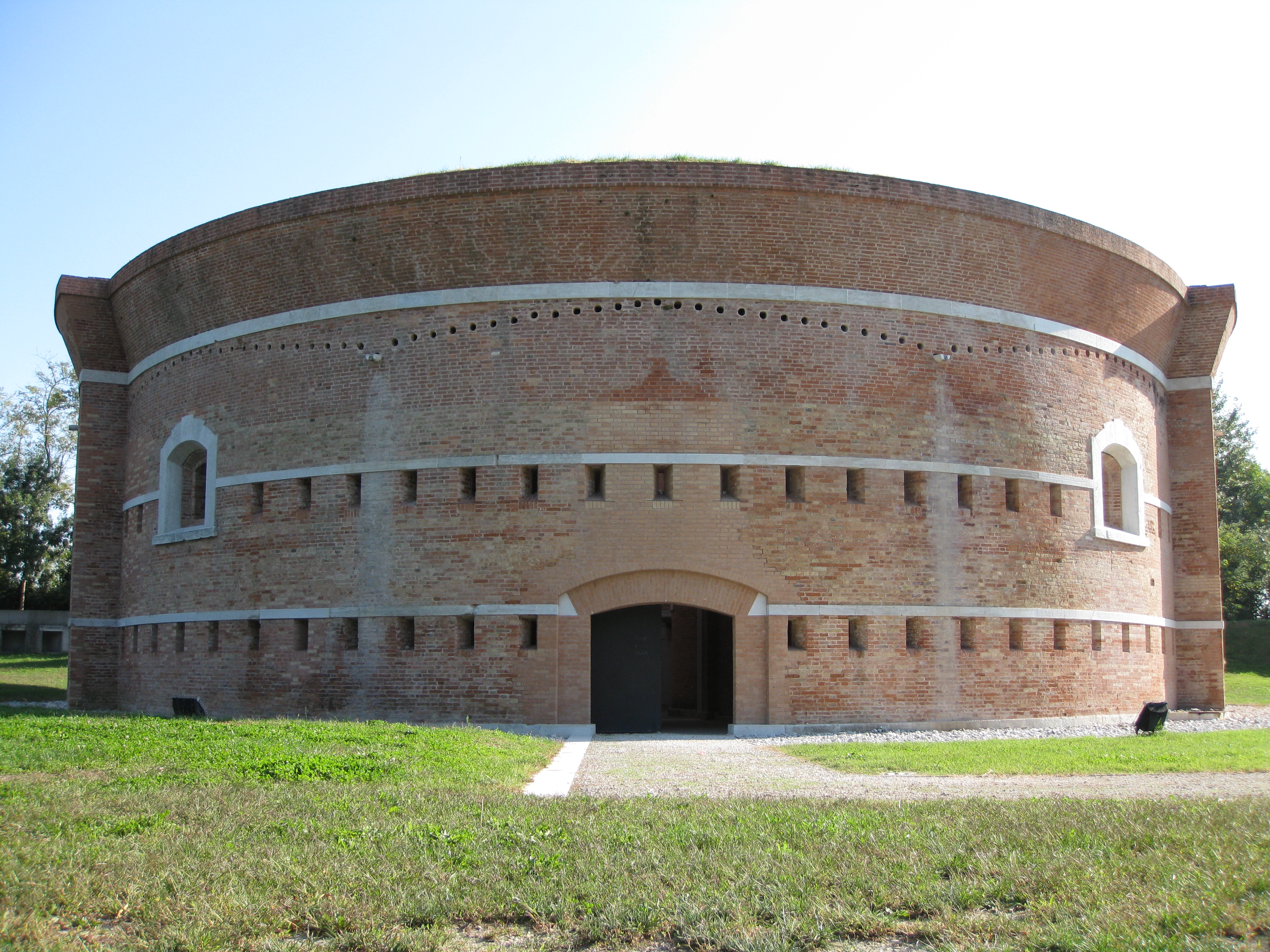
Fort

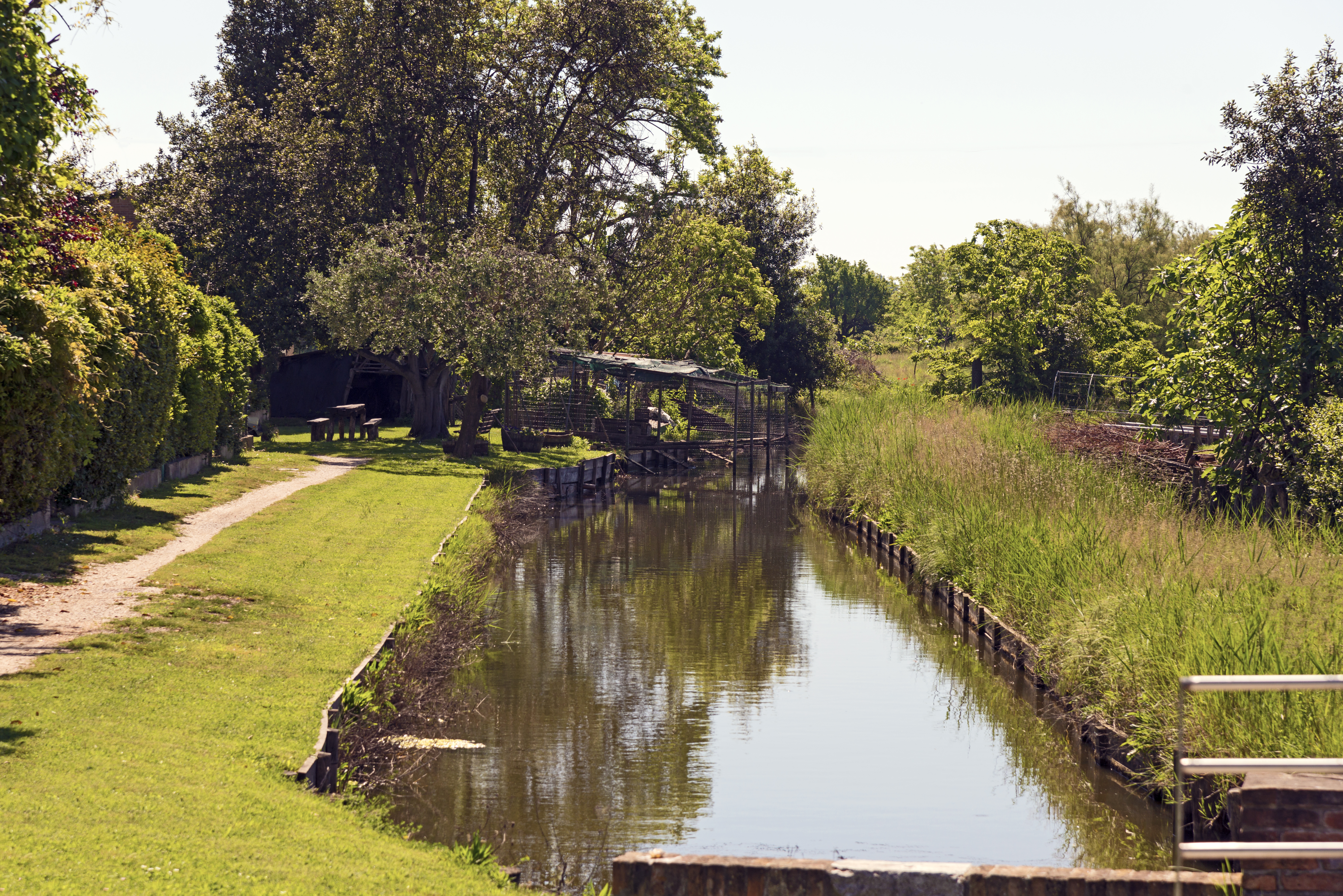
Brown and narrow canals of the island

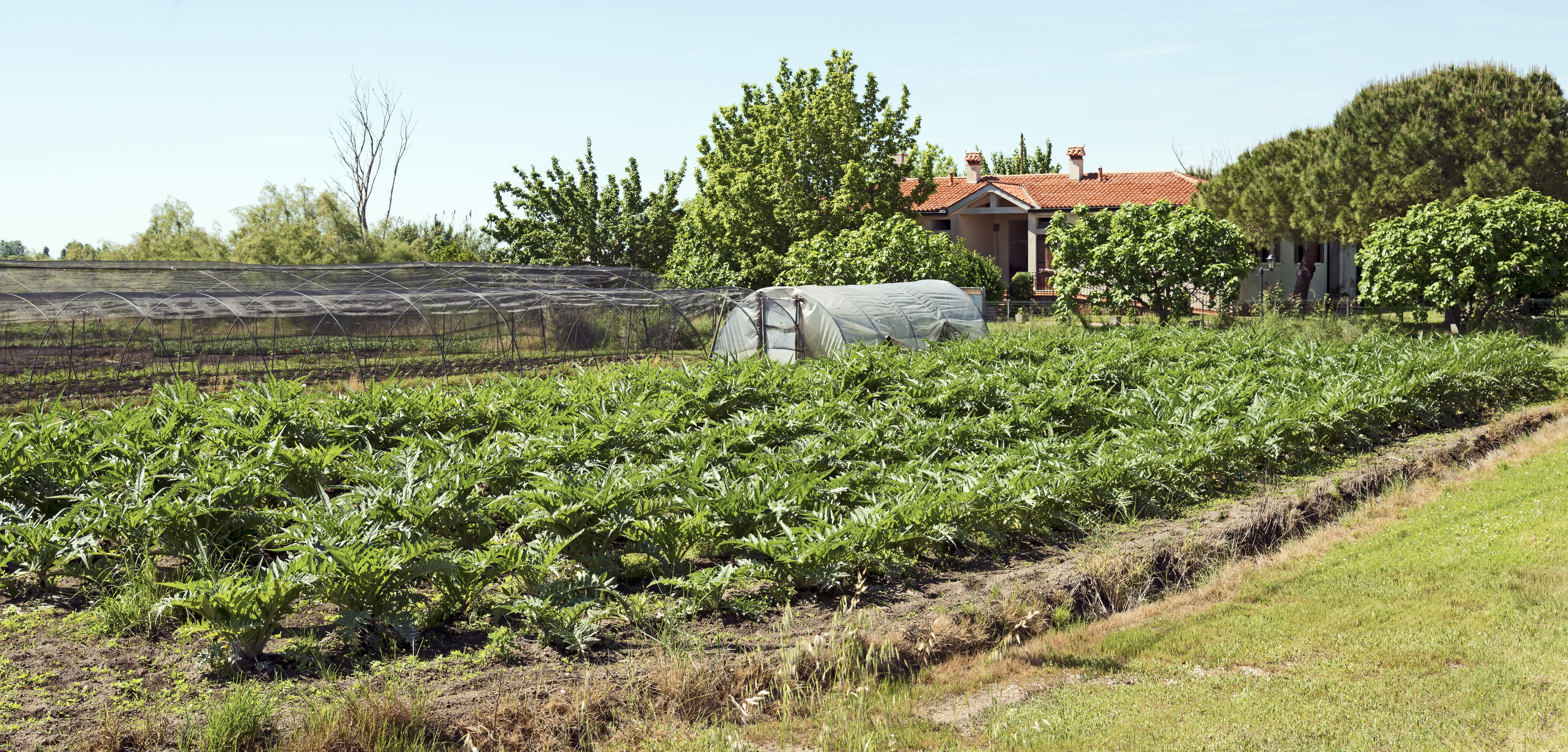
Artichoke plantations.

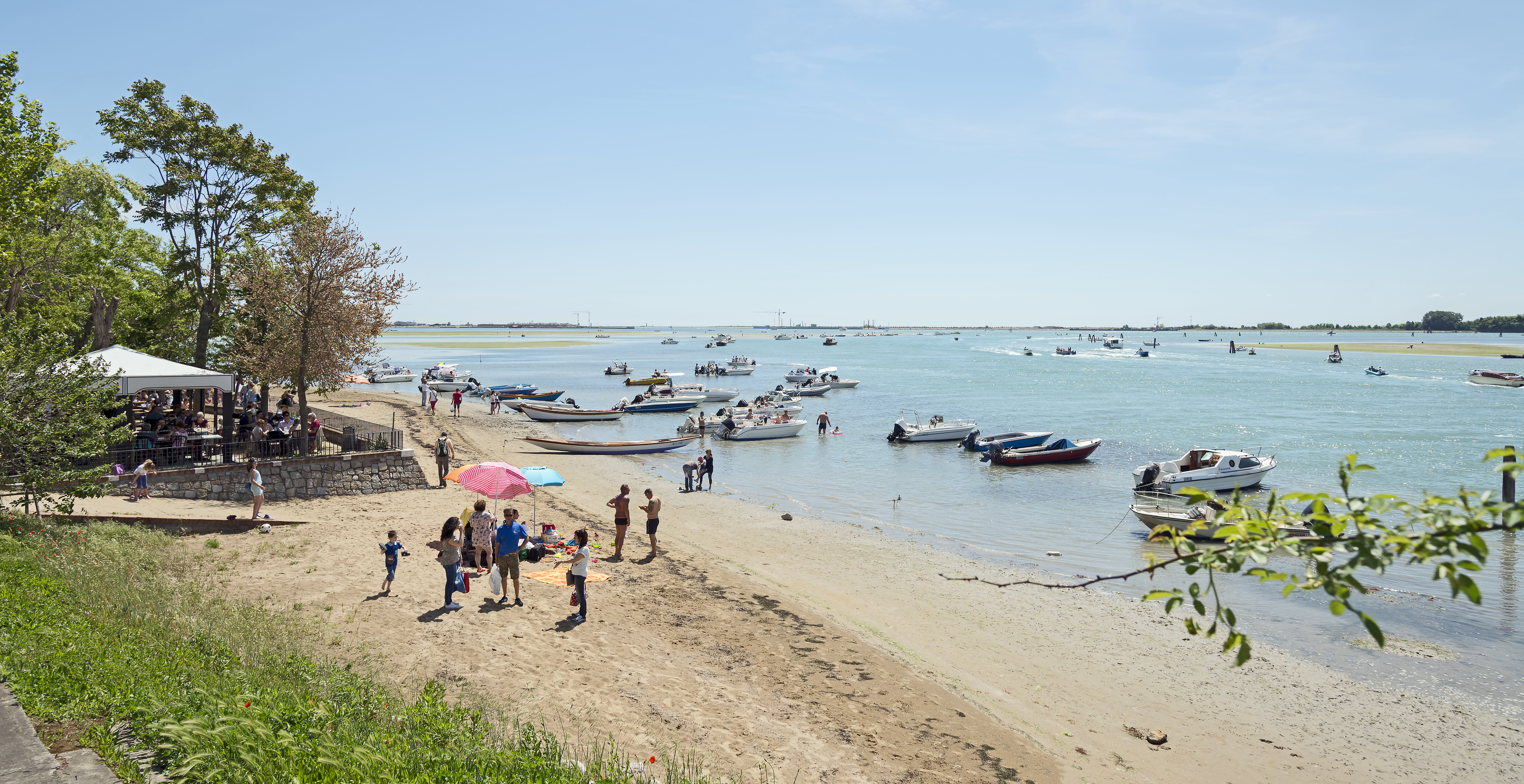
Beach, south end of the island of Sant'Erasmo.

== See also ==
- List of islands of Italy
