= Ferdinand Karl, Archduke of Austria-Este =

Ferdinand Karl of Austria
- Duke of Breisgau; Archduke of Austria-Este
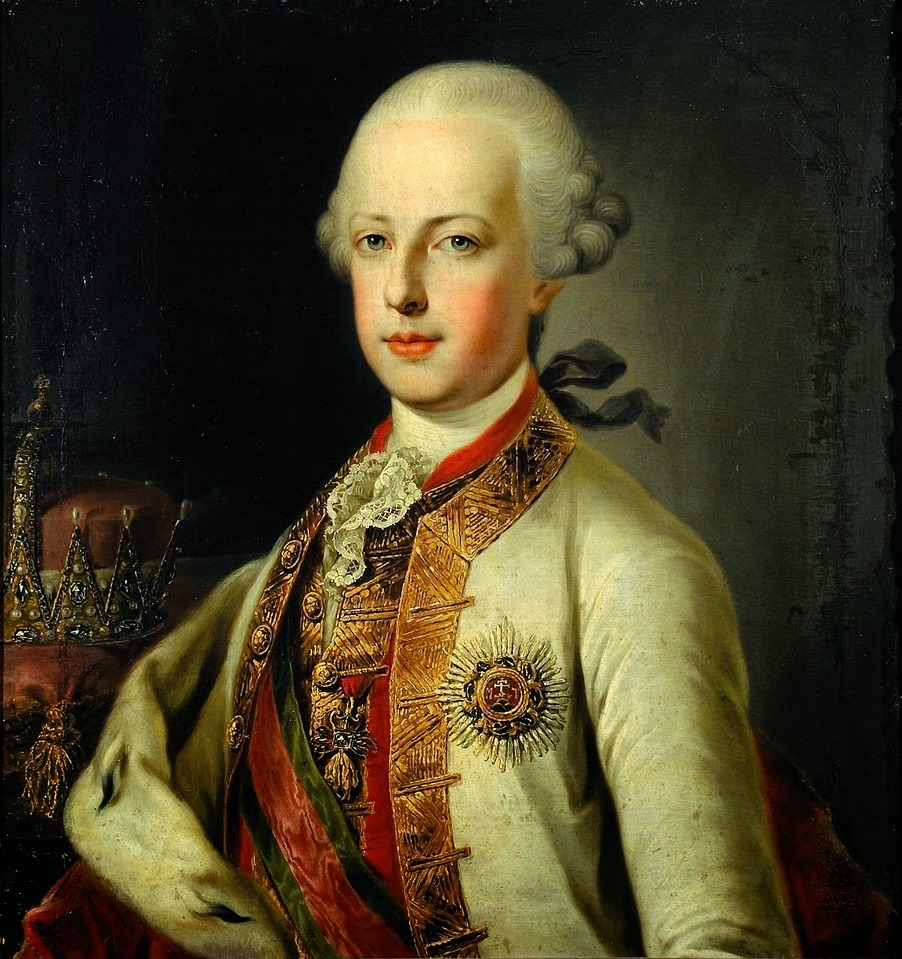
- Portrait by August Friedrich Oelenhainz, 1790
- Born: 1 June 1754; Schönbrunn Palace, Vienna, Austria, Holy Roman Empire
- Died: 24 December 1806 (aged 52); Vienna, Austrian Empire
- Burial: Imperial Crypt, Vienna
- Spouse: Maria Beatrice d'Este, Duchess of Massa (m. 1771)
- Issue Detail: Maria Theresa, Queen of Sardinia; Maria Leopoldine, Electress of Bavaria; Francis IV, Duke of Modena; Archduke Ferdinand Karl Joseph; Maximilian, Grand Master of Teutonic Knights; Archduke Karl, Archbishop of Esztergom; Maria Ludovika, Empress of Austria
Names
- English: Ferdinand Charles Anthony Joseph John Stanislas of Austria-Este; German: Ferdinand Karl Anton Josef Johann Stanislaus von Österreich-Este
- House: Habsburg-Lorraine (birth); Habsburg-Este (founder)
- Father: Francis I, Holy Roman Emperor
- Mother: Maria Theresa

Archduke Ferdinand Karl of Austria-Este (Ferdinand Karl Anton Joseph Johann Stanislaus; 1 June 1754 – 24 December 1806) was the son of Holy Roman Emperor Francis I and Maria Theresa of Austria. He was the founder of the House of Austria-Este and Governor of the Duchy of Milan between 1765 and 1796. He was also designated as the heir to the Duchy of Modena and Reggio, but he never reigned, owing to the Napoleonic Wars.

== Early life ==
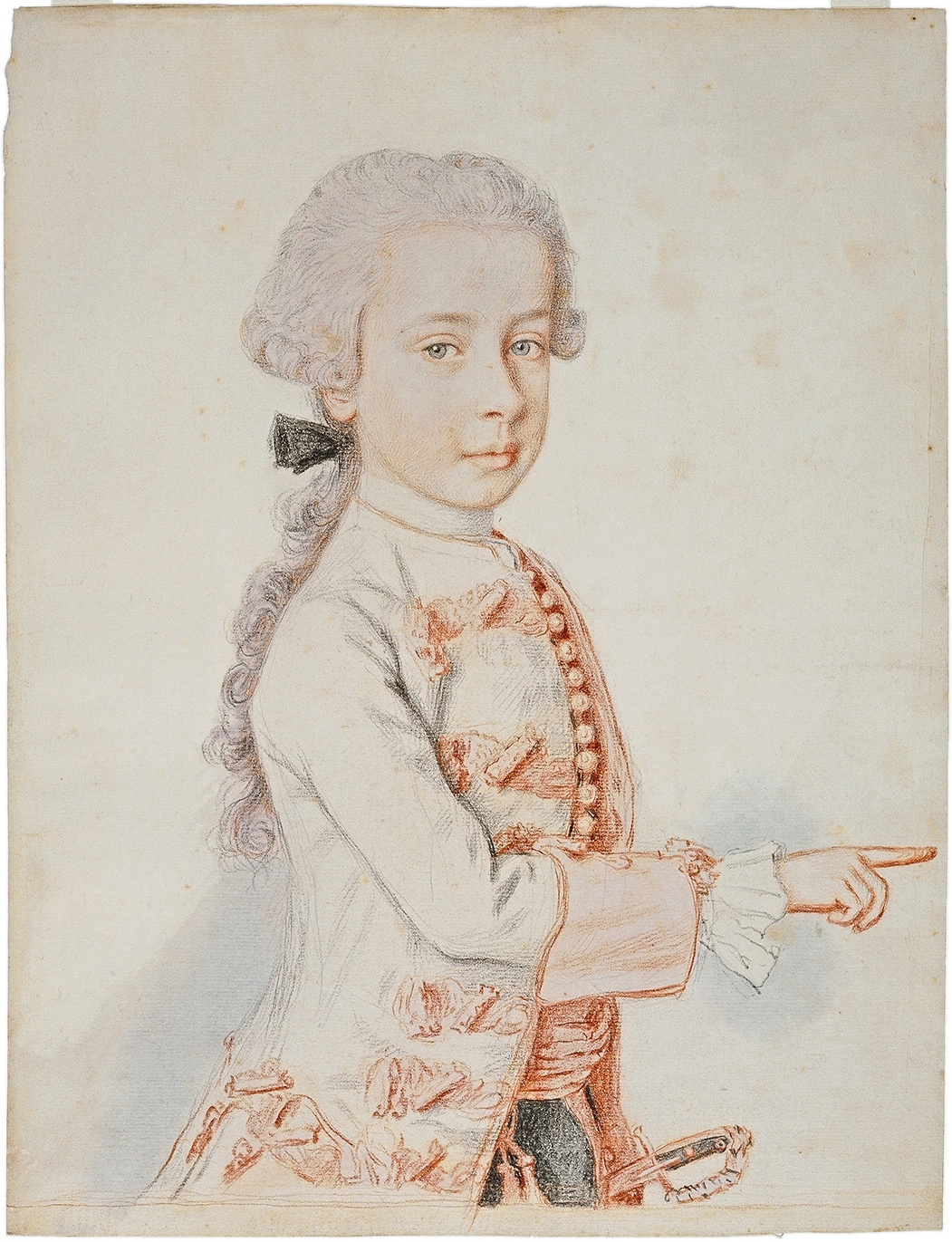
Watercolor portrait of Ferdinand Karl by Liotard in 1762

Ferdinand Karl was born on 1 June 1754 at the Schönbrunn Palace in Vienna as the fourth son and fourteenth child of the Holy Roman Emperor Franz I and his wife, Maria Theresa of Austria.

In 1763, the penultimate Este Duke of Modena, Francesco III, signed a treaty with the Empress Maria Theresa engaging the nine-year-old Ferdinand to his son Ercole's daughter, Maria Beatrice, making him thus his heir. There had been an earlier treaty in 1753 making Ferdinand's older brother Peter Leopold the heir to the Duchy of Modena, but in 1761, Peter Leopold became heir to the Grand Duchy of Tuscany, which required a change to the Modena agreement.

In 1771, the Perpetual Imperial Diet approved the eventual investiture of Ferdinand with the imperial fiefs held by Ercole III.

== Marriage and family ==
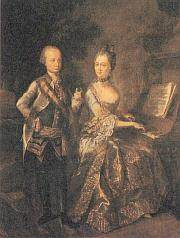
Ferdinand and his wife Maria Beatrice d'Este

On 15 October 1771, Ferdinand married Maria Beatrice Ricciarda d'Este (1750–1829), only surviving child of Ercole d'Este, heir to the Duchy of Modena and Reggio (although the marriage was not a requirement of Ferdinand's eventual succession). Festivities arranged for this occasion included the operas Ascanio in Alba by Mozart and Il Ruggiero by Johann Adolph Hasse.

They had ten children:

- Josef Franz (1 January 1772) died at birth.
- Maria Theresa (1 November 1773 – 29 March 1832); married Victor Emanuel I, King of Sardinia.
- Josepha (13 May 1775 – 20 August 1777) died in early childhood.
- Maria Leopoldina (10 December 1776 – 23 June 1848); married Charles Theodore, Elector of Bavaria.
- Francis IV (6 October 1779 – 21 January 1846); next Duke of Modena, married his niece, Princess Maria Beatrice of Savoy.
- Ferdinand Karl Joseph (25 April 1781 – 5 November 1850); Commander-in-Chief of the Austrian army during the Napoleonic Wars.
- Maximilian Joseph (14 July 1782 – 1 June 1863); Grand Master of the Teutonic Knights.
- Maria Antonia (21 October 1784 – 8 April 1786) died in early childhood.
- Karl (2 November 1785 – 2 September 1809); Archbishop of Esztergom, Primate of Hungary.
- Maria Ludovika (14 December 1787 – 7 April 1816); married her first cousin Francis I, Emperor of Austria.

== Career ==
Ferdinand became Governor of the Duchy of Milan on his marriage in 1771, as long as his father-in-law Ercole III d'Este still ruled the Duchy of Modena. He and his family lived in Milan.

In 1780, Ferdinand was confirmed as Governor of Lombardy by his brother, the new Holy Roman Emperor Joseph II. In 1796, Napoleon's invasion of Milan forced the family to flee the French forces. Duke Ercole III also had to flee Modena, which overthrew the monarchy and joined the Cisalpine Republic.

By the Treaty of Campo Formio in 1797, Duke Ercole III was granted the Duchy of Breisgau, a Habsburg territory in southwest Germany. When Ercole III died in 1803, Ferdinand succeeded as Duke of Breisgau, as well as "titular Duke" of Modena and Reggio. By the Treaty of Pressburg in 1805, Ferdinand ceded the Duchy of Breisgau to the Grand Duchy of Baden.

Ferdinand died the following year in Vienna, on 24 December. He is buried in the Imperial Crypt in Vienna.

In 1814, Ferdinand's eldest surviving son, Francis IV, was recognised as Duke of Modena by the Congress of Vienna.

== Ancestry ==
Ancestors of Ferdinand Karl, Archduke of Austria-Este

8. Charles V, Duke of Lorraine
4. Leopold, Duke of Lorraine
9. Eleonore of Austria
2. Francis I, Holy Roman Emperor
10. Philippe I, Duke of Orléans
5. Élisabeth Charlotte of Orléans
11. Elizabeth Charlotte of the Palatinate
1. Ferdinand Karl, Archduke of Austria-Este
12. Leopold I, Holy Roman Emperor
6. Charles VI, Holy Roman Emperor
13. Eleonore Magdalene of Neuburg
3. Maria Theresa of Austria
14. Louis Rudolph, Duke of Brunswick-Wolfenbüttel
7. Elisabeth Christine of Brunswick
15. Christine Louise of Oettingen-Oettingen

== Bibliography ==
- Velde, François R. "The Succession Laws of Modena". Heraldica.org.

Ferdinand Karl, Archduke of Austria-Este House of Austria-Este Cadet branch of the House of Habsburg Born: 1 June 1754 Died: 24 December 1806
Government offices
Preceded by Francesco III d'Este	Governors of the Duchy of Milan; 1771–1796	Succeeded by Transpadane Republic
