= Maria Beatrice d'Este, Duchess of Massa =

- Archduchess of Austria-Este
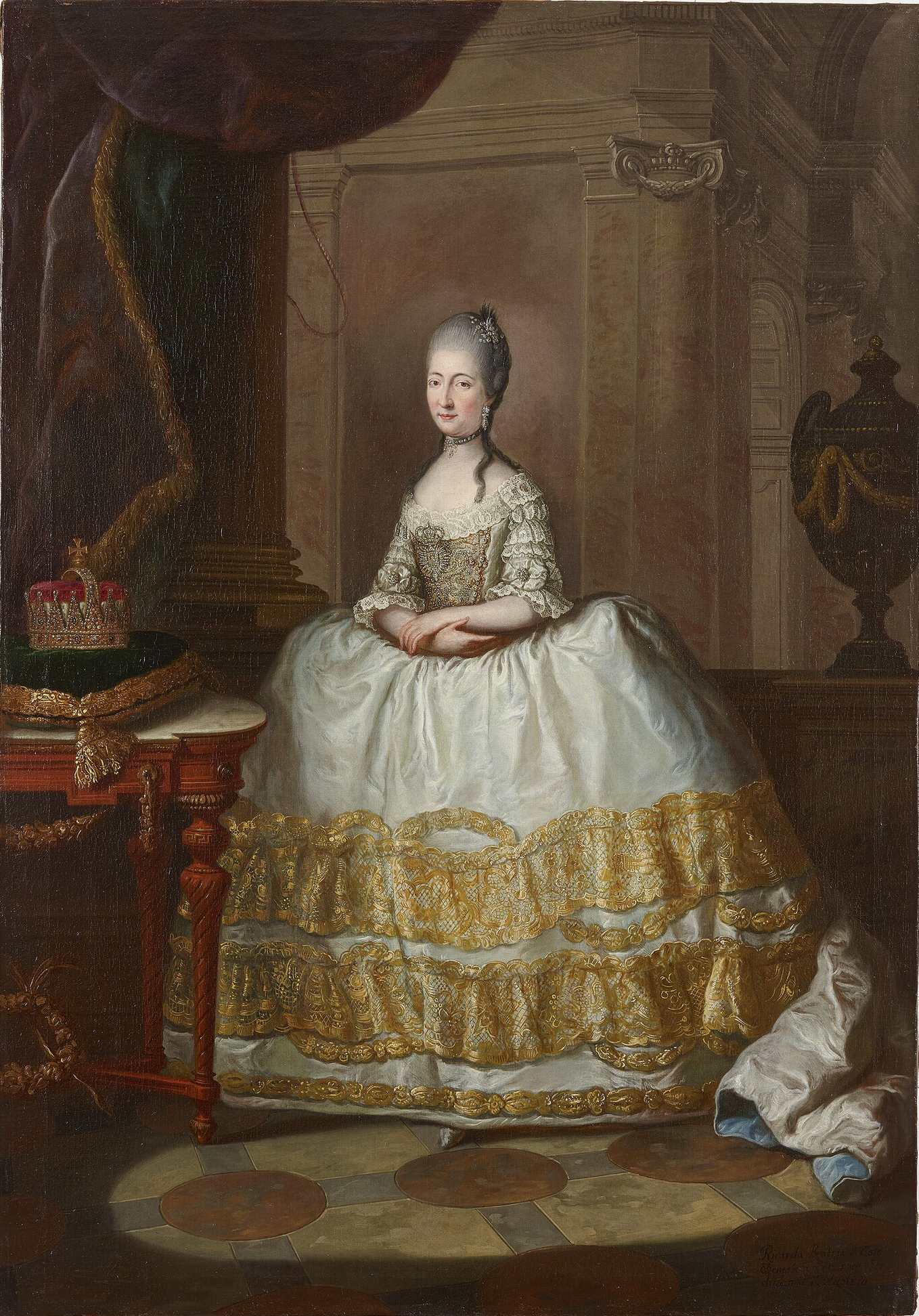
- Portrait by Anton von Maron, circa 1772

Duchess of Massa and Princess of Carrara
- 1st reign: 29 December 1790 – 30 June 1796
- Predecessor: Maria Teresa Cybo-Malaspina
- 2nd reign: 9 June 1815 – 14 November 1829
- Successor: Francis
- Born: 7 April 1750; Ducal Palace, Modena
- Died: 14 November 1829 (aged 79); Vienna, Austria
- Burial: Imperial Crypt, Vienna
- Spouse: Ferdinand Karl, Archduke of Austria-Este (m. 1771; died 1806)
- Issue Detail: Maria Theresa, Queen of Sardinia; Maria Leopoldine, Electress of Bavaria; Francis IV, Duke of Modena; Archduke Ferdinand Karl Joseph; Maximilian, Grand Master of Teutonic Knights; Archduke Karl, Archbishop of Esztergom; Maria Ludovika, Empress of Austria
Names
- Maria Beatrice Ricciarda d'Este
- House: Este
- Father: Ercole III d'Este, Duke of Modena
- Mother: Maria Teresa Cybo-Malaspina, Duchess of Massa

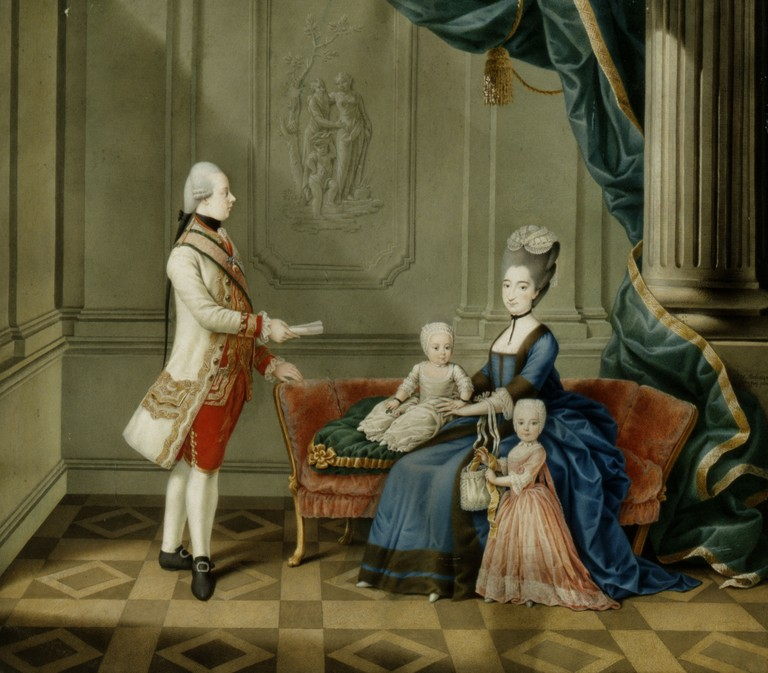
Archduke Ferdinand of Austria and Maria Beatrice d'Este holding Archduchess Maria Leopoldine, standing is Archduchess Maria Theresa of Austria-Este in pink dress

Maria Beatrice d'Este (Maria Beatrice Ricciarda; 7 April 1750 – 14 November 1829) was the last descendant of the House of Este, of the House of Cybo-Malaspina and, through her maternal grandmother Ricciarda Gonzaga, also of the Novellara branch of the House of Gonzaga. Ducal princess of Modena and Reggio, she became the sovereign duchess of Massa and Carrara from 1790 until 1796 and from 1815 until her death in 1829. Through her marriage, she was co-founder of the new branch, House of Austria-Este.

== Biography ==
=== Early life ===
Maria Beatrice was born on 7 April 1750 in Modena. She was the eldest child of Ercole Rinaldo d'Este, heir to the Duchy of Modena and Reggio (and future Duke, in 1780, under the name of Ercole III), and Maria Teresa Cybo-Malaspina, Duchess of Massa and Princess of Carrara.

Her parents' marriage was unhappy and they lived separated from each other for most of their lifes. They only had two children: Maria Beatrice herself and Rinaldo Francesco, born on 4 January 1753. The death of Rinaldo aged four months (5 May 1753) left Maria Beatrice as the only surviving child and it was evident that her parents would produce no further issue. Since in Modena and Reggio (but not in Massa and Carrara) the Salic law was in force which prohibited female succession to the throne, the duke her grandfather Francis III set out to prevent the Duchy, as a vacant imperial fief, from being simply absorbed by the Empire, just as, almost two centuries earlier, Ferrara, a papal fief, had been absorbed by the Papal State.

Therefore, in the same year 1753, two simultaneous treaties (one public and one secret) were concluded between the House of Este and the House of Austria, by which the Archduke Leopold, Empress Maria Theresa's ninth-born child and third son, and Maria Beatrice were engaged, and the former was designated by Francis III as heir for the imperial investiture as Duke of Modena and Reggio in the event of extinction of the Este male line. In the meantime, Francis would cover the office of governor of Milan ad interim, which was destined for the archduke. In 1761, however, following the death of an older brother, Leopold became heir to the throne of the Grand Duchy of Tuscany as provided for the second male heir of the imperial couple, and the treaties had to be revised.

=== Marriage ===
In 1763, in spite of the harsh opposition of Maria Beatrice's father, the two families agreed to simply replace the name of Leopold with that of Maria Teresa's fourteenth child, Archduke Ferdinand Karl of Austria, who was four years younger than his betrothed. In January 1771 the Perpetual Diet of Regensburg ratified Ferdinand's future investiture and, in October, Maria Beatrice and he finally got married in Milan, thus giving rise to the new House of Austria-Este. Festivities arranged for this occasion included the operas Ascanio in Alba by Mozart and Il Ruggiero by Johann Adolph Hasse.

Francis III ceded to the archduke the post of governor of Milan which he had assumed ad interim after the 1753 agreement, and the new archducal couple settled in Milan where they lived nearly 25 years producing, to the delight of Maria Theresa, a large offspring of ten children.

=== Duchess regnant ===
When Maria Beatrice's mother died in 1790, she succeeded her as Duchess of Massa and Carrara, but, despite turning out to be a scrupulous administrator, she never moved to her new duchy.

After the French conquest of Northern Italy, she spent her life mostly in Austria, eventually at the imperial court of her nephew-in-law Francis II/I, in Vienna. In 1808 she also became his mother-in-law following his marriage to her youngest daughter, Maria Ludovika.

She had previously been mother-in-law of the late Elector Charles Theodore of Bavaria, through marriage of another of her daughters Maria Leopoldine, and was still mother-in-law of King Victor Emmanuel I of Sardinia, through marriage of her eldest daughter Maria Theresa. In 1812, her eldest son and heir, the future Francis IV, Duke of Modena, in turn married his own niece, Maria Beatrice of Savoy, daughter of the latter-mentioned Maria Theresa.

In accordance with the 'principle of legitimacy' advocated by Metternich at the Congress of Vienna, Maria Beatrice was restored as sovereign of the 'Duchy of Massa and Principality of Carrara' in 1815, and the Imperial fiefs in Lunigiana, which had not been re-established, were also bestowed upon her. With an agreement in December, however, she ceded them to her son Francis IV who had been installed on the throne of the Duchy of Modena and Reggio, as heir to his father Ferdinand, in turn held to be the legal successor of Ercole III. At the time Archduchess Maria Beatrice was Empress Maria Theresa's last surviving daughter-in-law.

On her death, in 1829, she too was succeeded as ruler of Massa and Carrara by Francis IV, who in a few years completely assimilated his mother's ancient Tuscan domains within the 'Este States' (Stati Estensi), as his Duchy was officially styled. The House of Austria-Este was to rule Modena until 1859, when Second Italian War of Independence occurred.

== Issue ==
Name	Portrait	Lifespan	Notes
Archduke Josef Franz		1772	Died in infancy.
Archduchess Maria Theresa; Queen of Sardinia		1773– 1832	Married Victor Emmanuel I of Sardinia and had issue.
Archduchess Maria Josepha		1775– 1777	Died in infancy.
Archduchess Maria Leopoldine; Electress of Bavaria		1776– 1848	Married first Charles Theodore, Elector of Bavaria no issue; married second Ludwig Count of Arco, had issue.
Francis IV; Duke of Modena		1779– 1846	Married his niece Maria Beatrice of Savoy and had issue.
Archduke Ferdinand Karl Joseph; Commander-in-Chief of the Austrian army during the Napoleonic Wars		1781– 1850	Died unmarried.
Archduke Maximilian Joseph; Grand Master of the Teutonic Knights		1782– 1863	Died unmarried.
Archduchess Maria Antonia		1784– 1786	Died in infancy.
Archduke Karl Ambrosius; Archbishop of Esztergom		1785– 1809	Died unmarried.
Archduchess Maria Ludovika; Empress of Austria		1787– 1816	Married her cousin Francis I, Emperor of Austria and had no issue.

== Bibliography ==
- Angermüller, Rudolph (2005). Florilegium Pratense: Mozart, seine Zeit, seine Nachwelt (in German). Konigshausen & Neumann. ISBN 3-8260-3258-6.
- Palidda, Alessandra (2023). Urban Spectacle in Republican Milan: Pubbliche feste at the Turn of the Nineteenth Century. Cambridge University Press. ISBN 9781108991742.
- Riva, Elena (2008). "La corte dell'arciduca Ferdinando Asburgo Lorena, governatore di Milano (1771-1796). Appunti per una riecerca". In Cascetta, Annamaria; Zanlonghi, Giovanna (eds.). Il teatro a Milano nel Settecento: I contesti (in Italian). Vol. 1. Vita e Pensiero. pp. 71–96. ISBN 978-88-343-1965-9.

Regnal titles
Preceded by Maria Teresa	Duchess of Massa and Carrara; 1790–1796; 1815–1829	Succeeded by Francis
