= Karl Ludwig von Grünne =

Austrian military personnel (1808–1884)

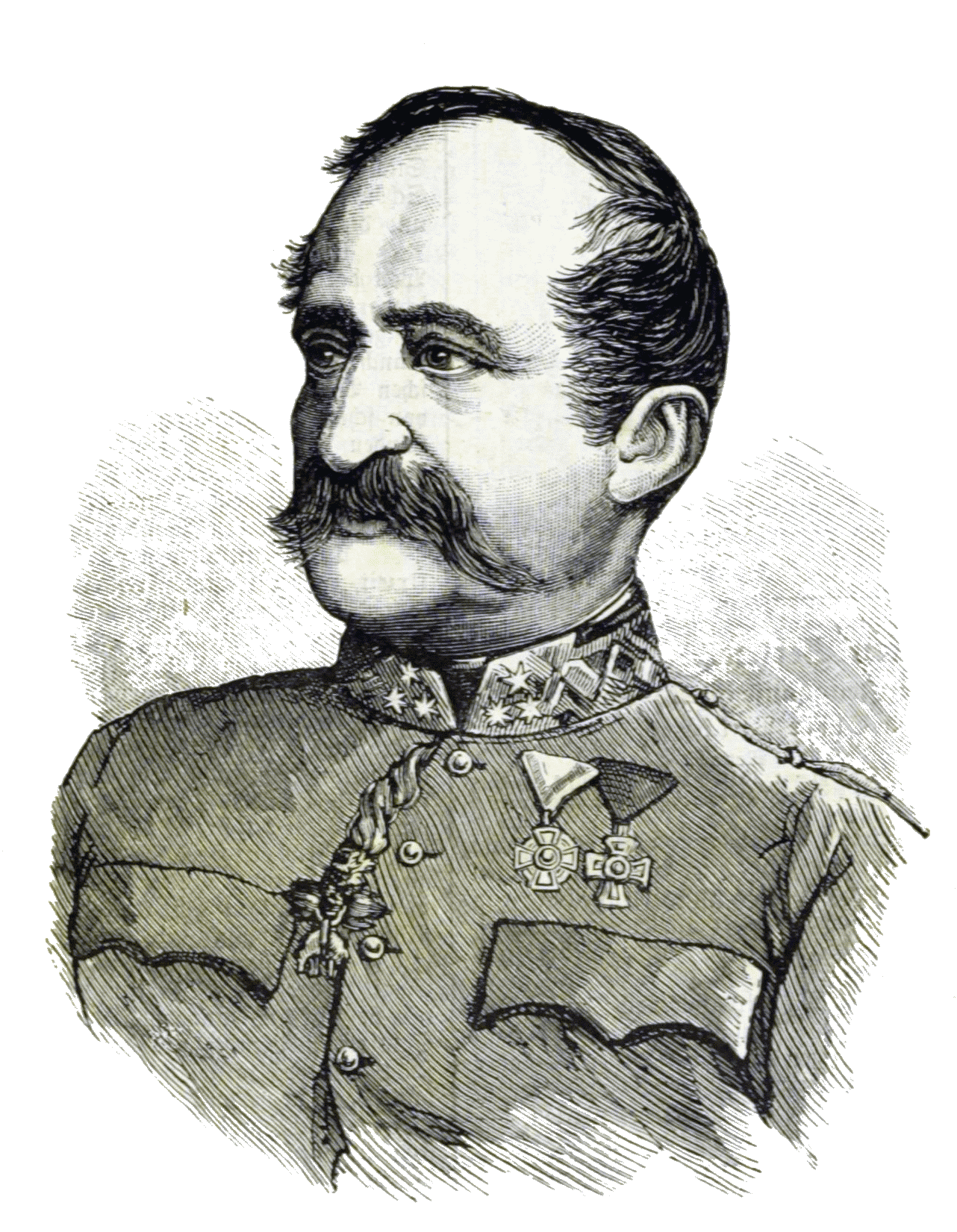
Karl Ludwig von Grünne in the 1873 Wiener Salonblatt

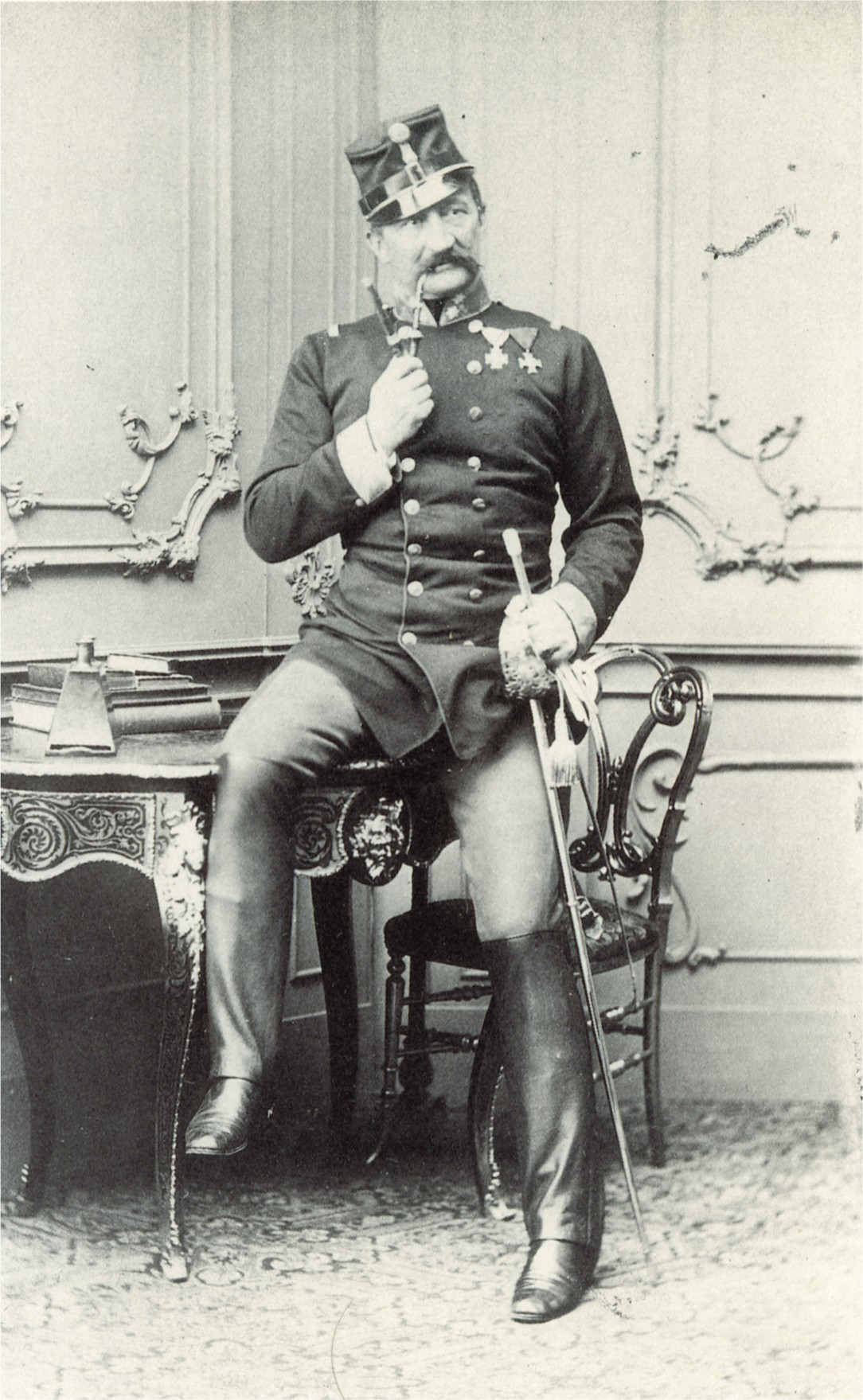
Karl Ludwig von Grünne

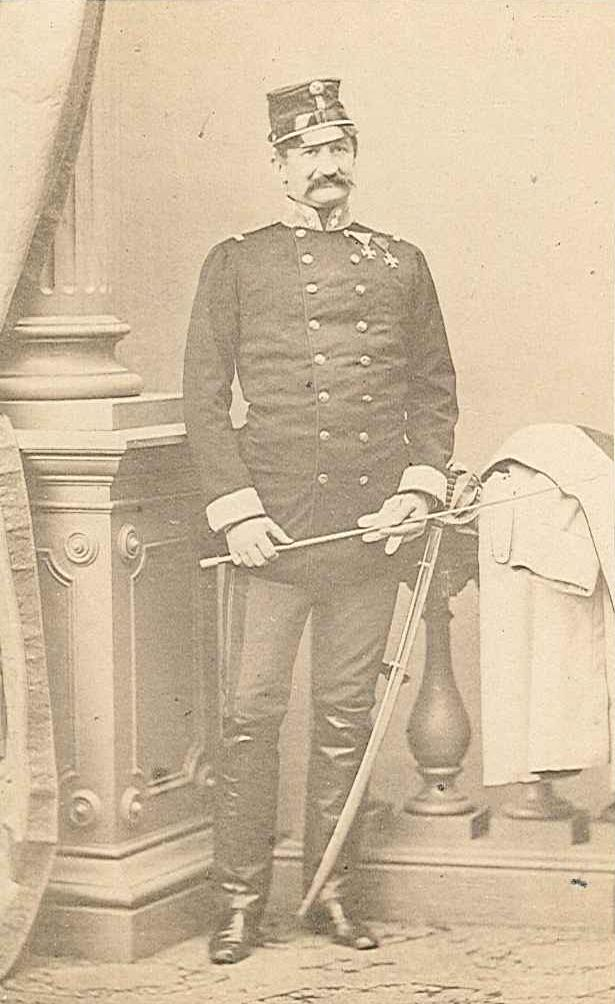
Karl Ludwig von Grünne

Count Karl Ludwig von Grünne-Pinchard (25 August 1808, Vienna - 15 June 1884, Baden bei Wien) was an Austro-Hungarian general.

== Biography ==
Karl Ludwig von Grünne was born as the only son and second child of Count Philipp Ferdinand von Grünne-Pinchart (1762-1854) and his wife, Baroness Rosalie van der Feltz (1779-1811). He had two sisters, Princess Rosalie von und zu Liechtenstein (1805-1841) and Countess Zoe von Wallmoden-Gimborn (1810-1894).

=== Career ===
Grünne joined his father's uhlan regiment in 1828. He rose to major in 1838 and colonel and head of Archduke Stephen's court in 1843. He was a favourite of Archduchess Sophie and was thus a strong influence on the young Archduke Franz Joseph. He was appointed to the Austrian Empire's privy council in 1847 and in August the following year became Obersthofmeister to Franz Joseph. On 19 October 1848 he was made a major general and when Franz Joseph became emperor on 2 December the same year, he made Grünne his chief adjutant and head of his military chancellery.

On 12 July 1850, Grünne was promoted to Lieutenant Field Marshal. After Austria was defeated in the 1859 Sardinian War, the people and the army mainly placed the blame on Grünne. The emperor wrote him a handwritten letter on 20 October 1859 dismissing him from his post as chief adjutant but making him a colonel and a Knight Grand Cross of the Order of St Stephen. Grünne also successfully petitioned the emperor to retain his role as captain of the gendarmerie guards.

Grünne gained promotion to Cavalry General on 22 November 1864.

On 23 August 1865, Grünne was put in command of No. 1 Uhlan Regiment.

In 1865, Grünne was made a Knight of the Order of the Golden Fleece and he also held the post of colonel-equerry until 3 November 1875, on which date he retired from it due to poor health. He spent the summer months of his retirement in Baden bei Wien in complete seclusion.

In 1883, Grünne was made a member of the Empire's Herrenhaus, but missed several meetings, again due to his health. He was still held in high esteem by the royal family and was visited at home by Franz Joseph, his son Crown Prince Rudolf and Rudolf's wife Stéphanie.

=== Later years ===
In his later years, Grünne separated from his wife Caroline, Countess of Trauttmansdorff-Weinsberg (1808-1886), whom he had married in 1831, by private arrangement rather than by a legal decision. They had three daughters and two sons - Philip became a Feldmarschallleutnant and Rudolph a colonel. Grünne's funeral was held in the Frauenkirche, Maria die Glorreiche in Baden bei Wien (then the court church) and his body was then buried in the family crypt at Dobersberg on 19 June 1884.
