= Archduke Maximilian of Austria-Este =

Archduke of Austria-Este, Prince Royal of Hungary and Bohemia (1782–1863)

Archduke Maximilian Joseph of Austria-Este
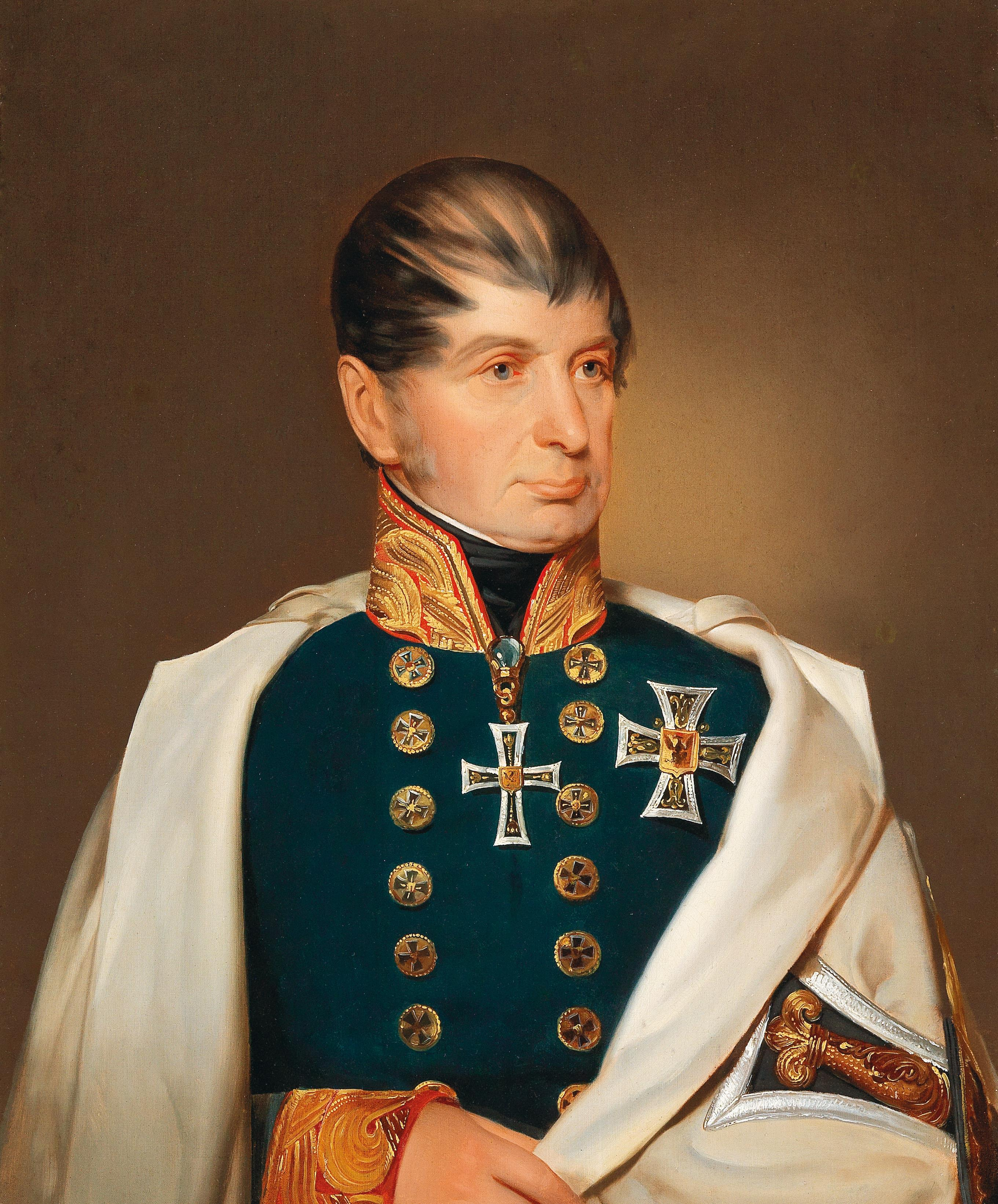
- Maximilian of Austria-Este as Grand Master of the Teutonic Order
- Predecessor: Archduke Anton Victor of Austria
- Successor: Archduke Wilhelm Franz of Austria
- Born: 14 July 1782; Milan, Duchy of Milan
- Died: 1 June 1863 (aged 80); Ebenzweier Castle
- Burial: Altmünster
- House: Austria-Este
- Father: Archduke Ferdinand of Austria-Este
- Mother: Maria Beatrice Ricciarda d'Este
- Occupation: Grand Master of the Teutonic Knights (1835–1863)

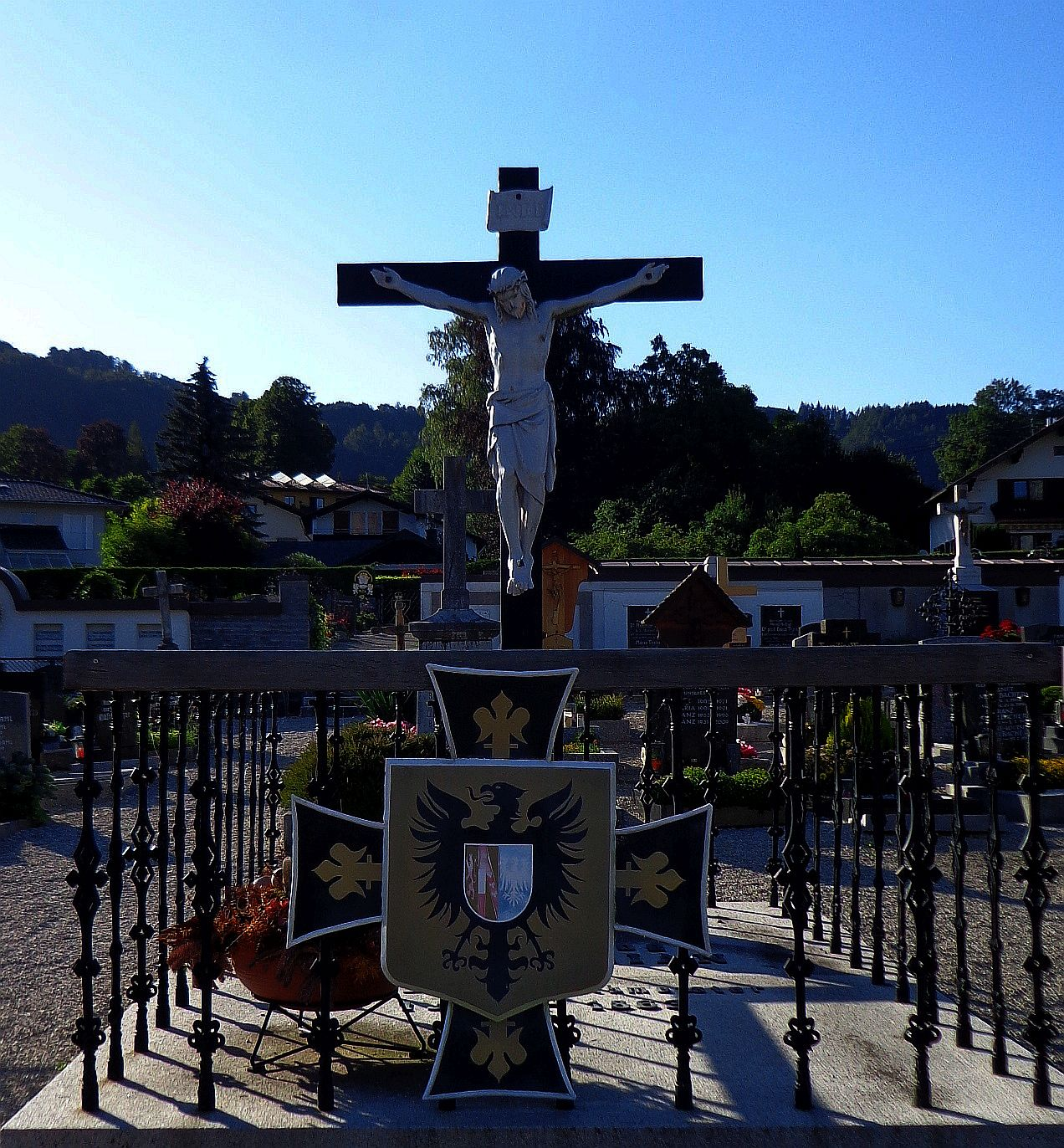
Altmünster cemetery, grave of Archduke Maximilian Joseph of Austria-Este.

Coat of arms of Archduke Maximilian of Austria-Este.

Archduke Maximilian Joseph of Austria-Este (14 July 1782 – 1 June 1863) was the fourth son of Archduke Ferdinand of Austria-Este and younger brother of Francis IV, Duke of Modena. He was grand master of the Teutonic Knights from 1835 to 1863.

== Biography ==
Born in Milan, Maximilian was the son of Archduke Ferdinand of Austria (son of Maria Theresa of Austria and governor of the Duchy of Milan) and Maria Beatrice Ricciarda d'Este. He spent his youth in Monza, where his family had fled after the French invasion of the Duchy of Modena. After staying in Verona, Padua, Trieste and Laibach, his family moved to Wiener Neustadt.

In 1801 he joined the Teutonic Order, obtaining the Austrian Cross in 1804. After studying in the Theresian Military Academy of Wiener Neustadt, he was named Major General in the Austrian Army (1805). In 1809 he fought in Germany against the French; he clashed with the Napoleonic troops at Regensburg, leading his army towards Linz. In 1819 he was elected a Royal Fellow of the Royal Society.

In 1830 Maximilian established himself in the Ebenzweier Castle, near Altmünster am Traunsee, while from 1831 to 1839 he lived in Linz. In 1835 he was named Grand Master of the Teutonic Order.

Maximilian erected several fortifications in the Austrian possessions in Italy, such as the Torri Massimiliane of Verona and the Torre Massimiliana of Venice.

He died in 1863 in the Ebenzweier castle. He is buried in Altmünster.

== Ancestry ==
Ancestors of Archduke Maximilian of Austria-Este

8. Leopold, Duke of Lorraine
4. Francis I, Holy Roman Emperor
9. Élisabeth Charlotte of Orléans
2. Ferdinand Karl, Archduke of Austria-Este
10. Charles VI, Holy Roman Emperor
5. Maria Theresa of Austria
11. Elisabeth Christine of Brunswick
1. Archduke Maximilian of Austria-Este
12. Francesco III d'Este, Duke of Modena
6. Ercole III d'Este, Duke of Modena
13. Charlotte Aglaé of Orléans
3. Maria Beatrice d'Este, Duchess of Massa
14. Alderano I Cybo-Malaspina, Duke of Massa
7. Maria Teresa Cybo-Malaspina, Duchess of Massa
15. Ricciarda Gonzaga

Grand Master of the Teutonic Order
Preceded by Anton Victor of Austria	Hochmeister; 1835–1863	Succeeded by Wilhelm Franz of Austria
