= Archduke Ferdinand Karl Joseph of Austria-Este =

Austrian general (1781–1850)

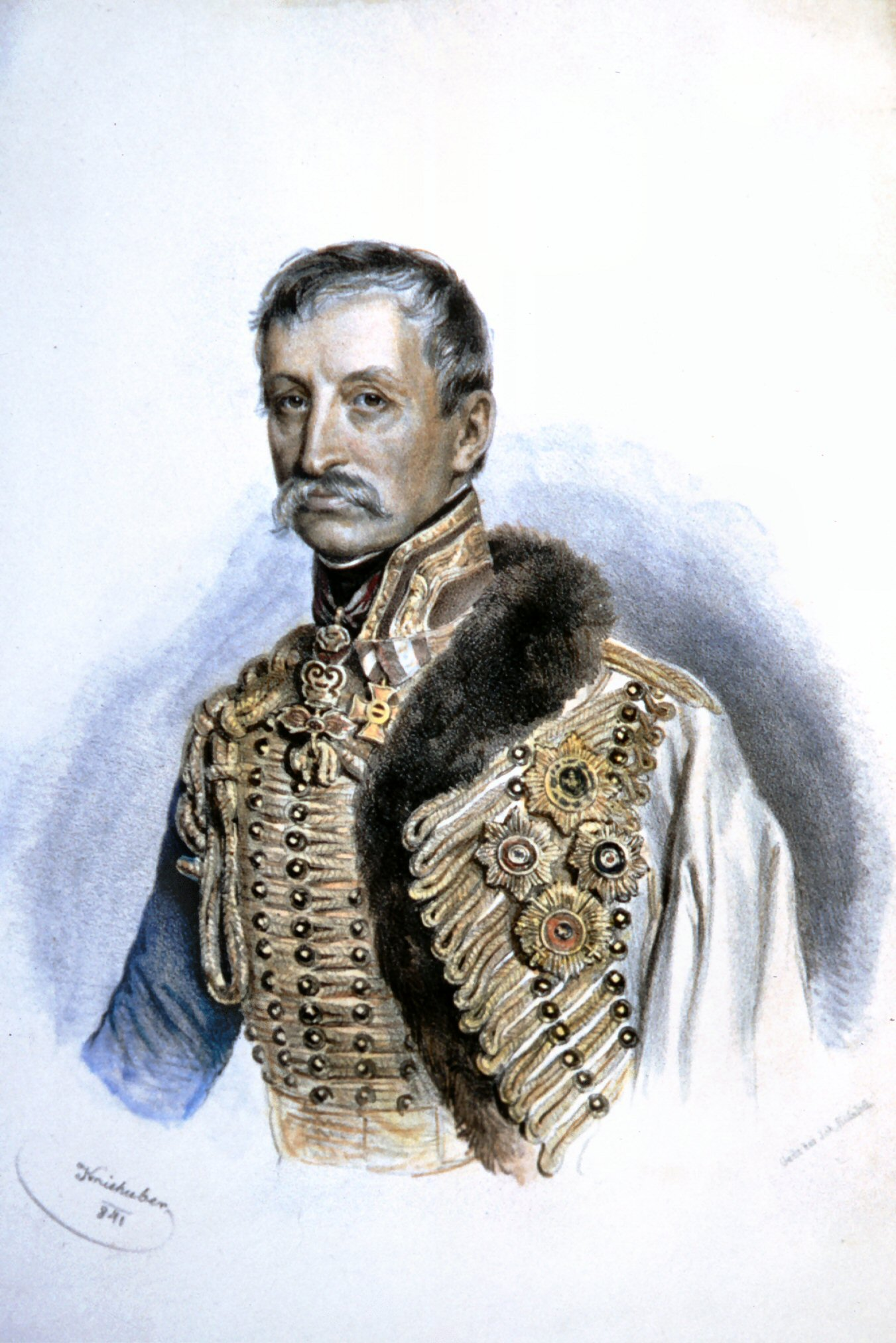
- lithography by Joseph Kriehuber, 1841
- Born: 25 April 1781; Milan, Duchy of Milan
- Died: 5 November 1850 (aged 69); Schloss Ebenzweier. Altmünster near Gmunden, Austrian Empire
- House: Austria-Este
- Father: Ferdinand Karl, Archduke of Austria-Este
- Mother: Maria Beatrice d'Este, Duchess of Massa

Archduke Ferdinand Karl Joseph of Austria-Este (25 April 1781 – 5 November 1850) was the third son of Archduke Ferdinand of Austria-Este and Princess Maria Beatrice Ricciarda d'Este, last member and heiress of the House of Este. For much of the Napoleonic Wars, he was in command of the Austrian army.

Ferdinand was born at Milan. He attended the Theresian Military Academy in Wiener Neustadt before embarking on a military career. In 1805, in the War of the Third Coalition against France, Ferdinand was commander-in-chief of the Austrian forces with General Karl Freiherr Mack von Leiberich as his quartermaster general. In October, his army was surrounded at Ulm. General Mack surrendered, but Ferdinand managed to escape with 2,000 cavalry to Bohemia. There, he took command of the Austrian troops and raised the local militia. With a total of 9,000 men, he set out for Iglau to distract attention from the Coalition's movements. He succeeded in holding the Bavarian division of Prince Karl Philipp von Wrede in Iglau thereby and preventing it from joining the Battle of Austerlitz.

In 1809, in the War of the Fifth Coalition against France, Ferdinand commanded an Austrian army of 36,000 men. In April, he invaded the Duchy of Warsaw, hoping to encourage a local uprising against Napoleon (see Polish–Austrian War). But the Poles rallied to Prince Józef Antoni Poniatowski. Ferdinand was victorious at the Battle of Raszyn, which managed to recapture Warsaw. In June, however, Ferdinand was compelled to withdraw from Warsaw, and to give up Kraków and Galicia as well.

In 1815, in the War of the Seventh Coalition against France, Ferdinand commanded two divisions of the Austrian Reserve. The following year, he was appointed military commander in Hungary.

In 1830, Ferdinand was appointed military and civil governor of Galicia, taking up residence in Lemberg. After the Revolution of 1848, he lived mostly in Italy.

Ferdinand never married. In 1850, he died at Schloss Ebenzweier in Altmünster near Gmunden, Austria.

== Honours ==
- Habsburg Monarchy:
  - Knight of the Military Order of Maria Theresa, 1801
  - Knight of the Golden Fleece, 1808
  - Grand Cross of the Royal Hungarian Order of St. Stephen, 1815
- Kingdom of Hanover: Grand Cross of the Royal Guelphic Order, 1821
- Kingdom of Prussia: Knight of the Black Eagle, 4 September 1841
- Two Sicilies: Grand Cross of St. Ferdinand and Merit
- Russian Empire:
  - Knight of St. Andrew, January 1826
  - Knight of St. Alexander Nevsky
  - Knight of the White Eagle
  - Knight of St. Anna, 1st Class

== Ancestry ==
Ancestors of Archduke Ferdinand Karl Joseph of Austria-Este

8. Leopold, Duke of Lorraine
4. Francis I, Holy Roman Emperor
9. Élisabeth Charlotte of Orléans
2. Ferdinand Karl, Archduke of Austria-Este
10. Charles VI, Holy Roman Emperor
5. Maria Theresa of Austria
11. Elisabeth Christine of Brunswick
1. Archduke Ferdinand Karl Joseph of Austria-Este
12. Francesco III d'Este, Duke of Modena
6. Ercole III d'Este, Duke of Modena
13. Charlotte Aglaé of Orléans
3. Maria Beatrice d'Este, Duchess of Massa
14. Alderano I Cybo-Malaspina, Duke of Massa
7. Maria Teresa Cybo-Malaspina, Duchess of Massa
15. Ricciarda Gonzaga
