= Archduke Karl Ambrosius of Austria-Este =

Karl of Austria-Este
- Prince Archbishop of Esztergom
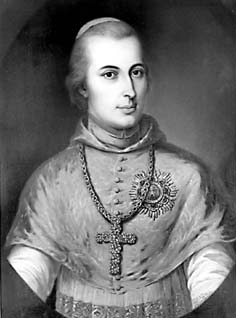
- Born: 2 November 1785; Milan, Duchy of Milan
- Died: 2 September 1809 (aged 23); Tata, Kingdom of Hungary
Names
- Karl Ambrosius Joseph Johann Baptist
- House: House of Austria-Este
- Father: Archduke Ferdinand of Austria-Este
- Mother: Maria Beatrice Ricciarda d'Este
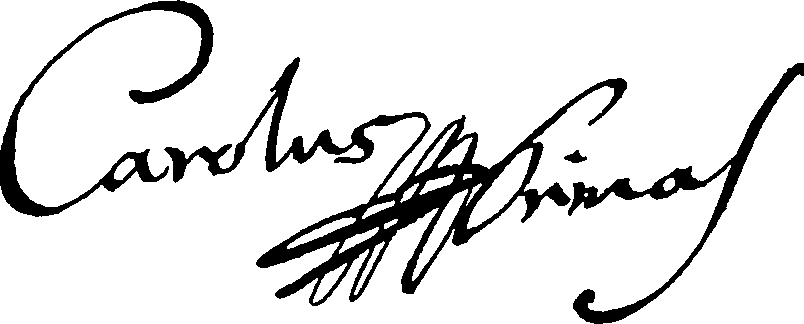
- Signature

Archduke Karl Ambrosius Joseph Johann Baptist of Austria-Este (Hungarian: Habsburg–Estei Károly Ambrus főherceg; Milan, 2 November 1785 – Tata, Hungary 2 September 1809) was an Archbishop of Esztergom.

== Biography ==
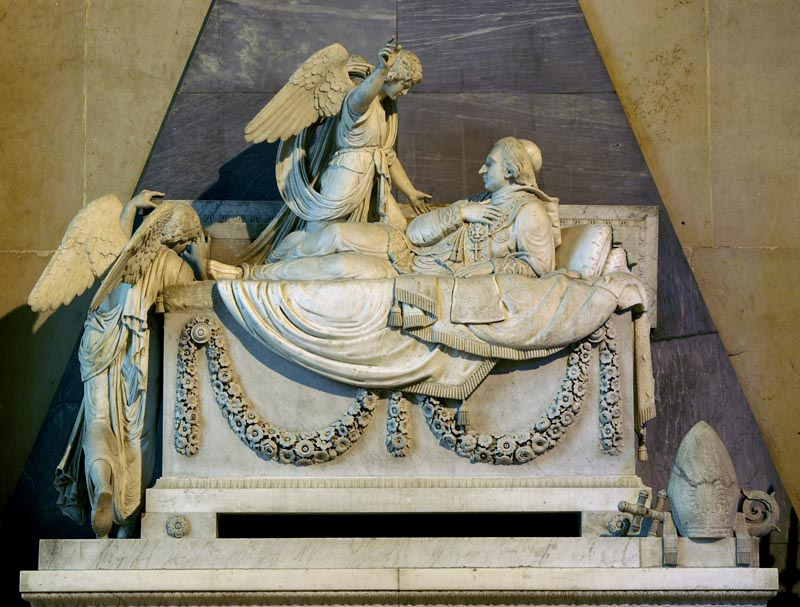
Tomb of Archduke Karl of Austria-Este, by Giuseppe Pisani.

Born His Royal Highness Archduke Karl Ambrosius of Austria-Este, the sixth son of Archduke Ferdinand of Austria-Este (son of Maria Theresa of Austria and governor of the Duchy of Milan) and of his wife, Princess Maria Beatrice Ricciarda d'Este, Duchess of Massa and Princess of Carrara, Lady of Lunigiana.

He spent his youth in Monza, where his family had fled after the French invasion of the Duchy of Modena. After staying in Verona, Padua, Trieste and Laibach, his family moved in Wiener Neustadt.

Because of his fragility, he was intended for church life. He became Bishop of Vác in 1806 and Archbishop of Esztergom, two years later, making him Primate of Hungary.
He died one year later at the age of 23.

== Ancestry ==
Ancestors of Archduke Karl Ambrosius of Austria-Este

8. Leopold, Duke of Lorraine
4. Francis I, Holy Roman Emperor
9. Élisabeth Charlotte d'Orléans
2. Ferdinand Karl, Archduke of Austria-Este
10. Charles VI, Holy Roman Emperor
5. Maria Theresa of Austria
11. Elisabeth Christine of Brunswick
1. Archduke Karl Ambrosius of Austria-Este
12. Francesco III d'Este, Duke of Modena
6. Ercole III d'Este, Duke of Modena
13. Charlotte Aglaé d'Orléans
3. Maria Beatrice d'Este, Duchess of Massa
14. Alderano I Cybo-Malaspina, Duke of Massa
7. Maria Teresa Cybo-Malaspina, Duchess of Massa
15. Ricciarda Gonzaga
