= Archduchess Maria Leopoldine of Austria-Este =

Maria Leopoldine of Austria-Este
- Countess von Arco
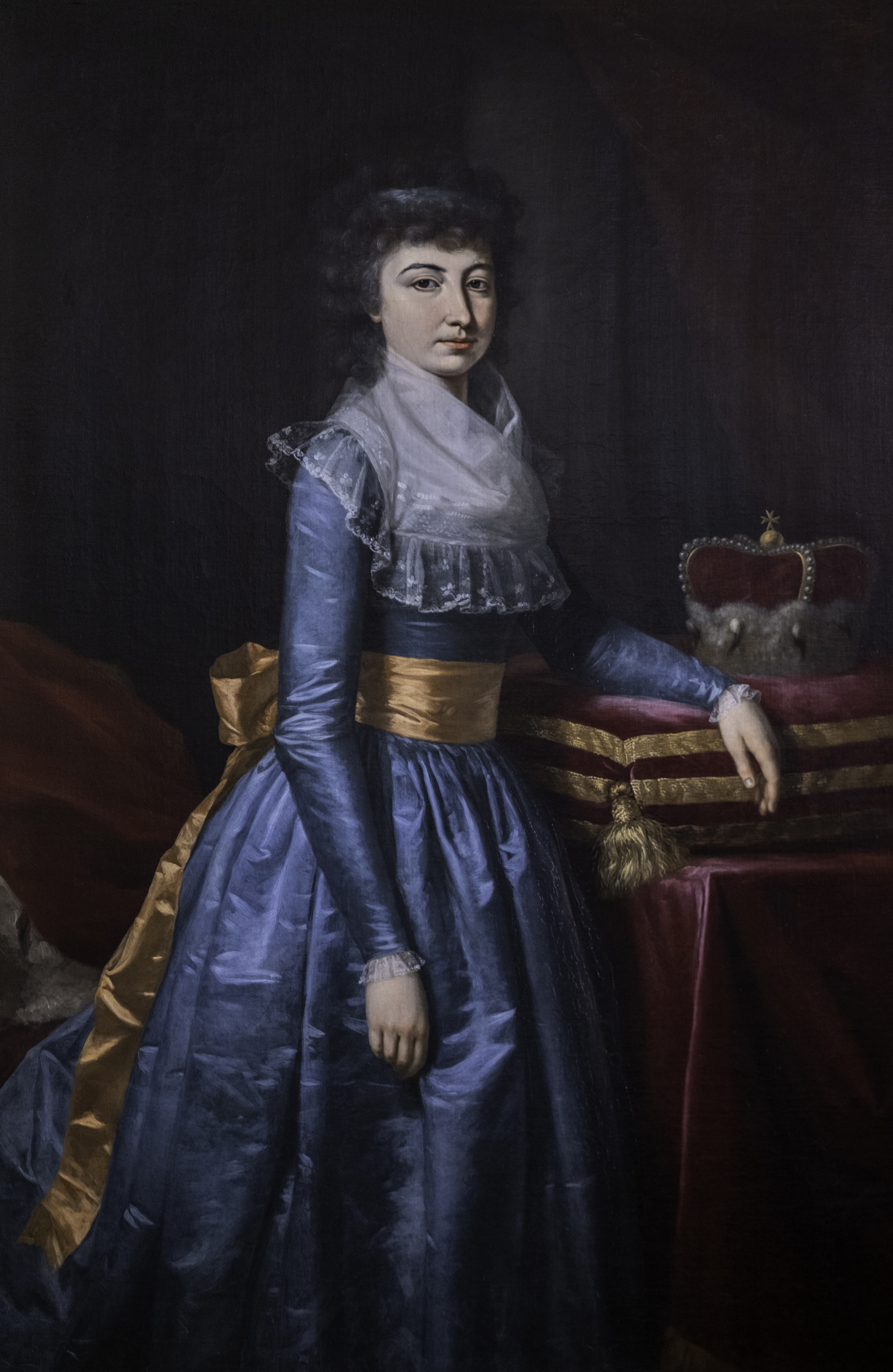
- Maria Leopoldine by Moritz Kellerhoven, c. 1795

Electress consort of Bavaria
- Tenure: 15 February 1795 - 16 February 1799
- Born: 10 December 1776; Milan, Duchy of Milan
- Died: 23 June 1848 (aged 71); Wasserburg am Inn, Kingdom of Bavaria
- Spouse: Charles Theodore, Elector of Bavaria (m. 1795; died 1799) Count Ludwig von Arco (m. 1804)
- Issue: Count Aloys Nikolaus von Arco; Count Maximilian Joseph von Arco; Countess Caroline von Arco
- House: Austria-Este
- Father: Archduke Ferdinand of Austria-Este
- Mother: Maria Beatrice Ricciarda d'Este

Archduchess Maria Leopoldine of Austria-Este (10 December 1776 – 23 June 1848) was an Electress of Bavaria as the second wife of Charles Theodore, Elector of Bavaria.

== Early life (1776–1795) ==
Archduchess Maria Leopoldine Anna Josephine Johanna of Austria-Este was born in Milan on 10 December 1776 as the fourth child and third (but second surviving) daughter of Archduke Ferdinand Karl of Austria-Este and his wife, Princess Maria Beatrice Ricciarda d'Este. Her father, the third eldest surviving son of Empress Maria Theresa, and her mother were the founders of the House of Austria-Este. Although Archduke Ferdinand wasn't as gifted as his eldest brother Joseph II, his rule as Governor of the Duchy of Milan made him extremely popular; he and his wife sought closeness to their subjects and owed their high esteem above all to their social commitment.

Ferdinand Karl and Maria Beatrice were loving parents and concentrated on the education of their children. They tried to raise their sons to high positions and marry their daughters favorably. Above all, Ferdinand's thoughts were marked by his mother's dynastic way of thinking, and so he made early favorable marriage plans for his children. Firstly, he arranged the marriage of his eldest daughter Maria Theresa (named after her grandmother) to Victor Emmanuel, Duke of Aosta, the second son of King Victor Amadeus III of Sardinia, in 1789. Maria Leopoldine was at this time thirteen and had evolved into a fun-loving and pretty girl with a strong Italian temperament. Even then, she openly expressed her opinion and protested loudly against unjust treatment.

== Electress of Bavaria (1795–1804) ==
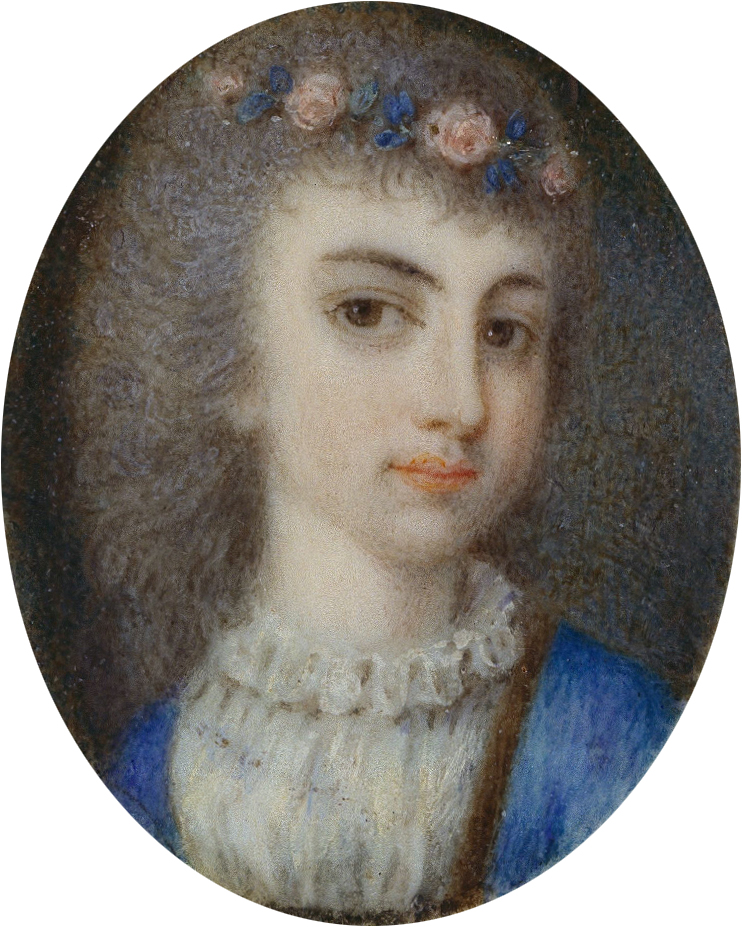
Portrait of Maria Leopoldine as Electress of Bavaria (by an unknown artist)

Charles Theodore, Elector of Bavaria, had been married to Countess Palatine Elisabeth Auguste of Sulzbach since 1742; however, their union was not happy and only produced one son, who died in infancy. Charles Theodore was the father of numerous illegitimate children from his relationships with Françoise Després-Verneuil and Josefa Seyffert, who hadn't any claims to the electorate. The Palatinate-Sulzbach branch of the House of Wittelsbach was threatened with dying out after the death of the Elector if he couldn't father any legitimate descendants. Therefore, Charles Theodore decided after the death of his wife in August 1794 to contract a second marriage with an Archduchess of the House of Habsburg-Lorraine, since they were regarded as one of the most prestigious ruling families in Europe. Looking for a suitable Habsburg bride as the new Electress of Bavaria, Emperor Francis II selected his cousin, Archduchess Maria Leopoldina of Austria-Este, who was described as a beautiful, well-grown and educated girl. Also a physical defect, a shorter left leg, was mentioned. Furthermore, her dance skills were praised and the potential ability to bear children was highlighted.

The 18-year-old Maria Leopoldine had no idea of this marriage project and did not know her 70-year-old bridegroom personally. While Archduke Ferdinand consented to the marriage between his young daughter and the aged elector, his wife Maria Beatrice had doubts. Nevertheless, the marriage was agreed and the young archduchess had to sacrifice her own happiness to the reasons of state. In early January 1795 Count Maximilian von Waldburg-Zeil zu Trauchburg arrived in Milan to negotiate the marriage contract for his master the Bavarian elector. In the course of this visit, he gave the bride a portrait of her future husband and sent a detailed picture of the young archduchess. In a letter to Charles Theodore, he described Maria Leopoldine as a girl who was more Italian than German, both in appearance and in character. He praised her well-formed waist and the beautiful proportions of her round face. He also emphasized her piety and her knowledge of Italian, French and German. Charles Theodore was enthusiastic about the descriptions of his future wife and stated that, after his death, she would receive the Electoral Palace of Munich or Neuburg Castle as a widow's seat, and her court would be paid out from the state funds.

In early February 1795 the engagement was officially announced, and on 15 February, the Carnival Sunday, the wedding ceremony took place in the Throne Room of the Innsbruck Hofburg. Only the closest family members were invited to the wedding, and three days later the newlyweds left Innsbruck for Bavaria. When they arrived to Munich, magnificent balls and feasts were organized, and plays were performed.

Maria Leopoldine seemed at first to join her fate and fulfill the expectations that her family and her husband made of her. The marriage, however, was doomed from the beginning, since the bride couldn't develop any feelings for her elderly groom. Soon after the wedding, she withdrew from her husband's attempts to approach her, and after a violent dispute she even refused to fulfill her marital duties. The young electress avoided the company of her husband and sought the proximity of young people. Maria Leopoldine even showed openly against the marriage with the aged elector. The electress terrorized her husband and the entire court in Munich, and publicly took lovers from all social status. These included an Italian guardsman, the court musician Franz Eck, the famous Bavarian statesman Count Maximilian von Montgelas, the chamberlain Count Karl von Arco and the Augsburg canon and philandering Count Karl von Rechenberg. She also ended the relationship with her family in Austria, as she blamed them for her marriage; instead she chose to make an alliance with the House of Palatinate-Zweibrücken (the elector's presumptive heirs) in opposition to the alliance her husband had forged with her own Habsburg family.

On 12 February 1799 Charles Theodore suffered a stroke and Maria Leopoldine immediately wrote the eventual successor Duke Maximilian Joseph of Palatinate-Zweibrücken to testimony her loyalty to him:

Dear nephew, at the most important moment of my life, I turn to you. The Elector is in agony. I have only the time to recommend you. Remember that you are my only support, and that as long as you are with me, I am privileged to be a member of the House of Palatinate. I hope you are convinced that I was always attached to you as a sincere friend. Now I am your subject and I am proud of it. I am waiting for you with impatience, and will be directed to your orders.

=== Widowhood ===
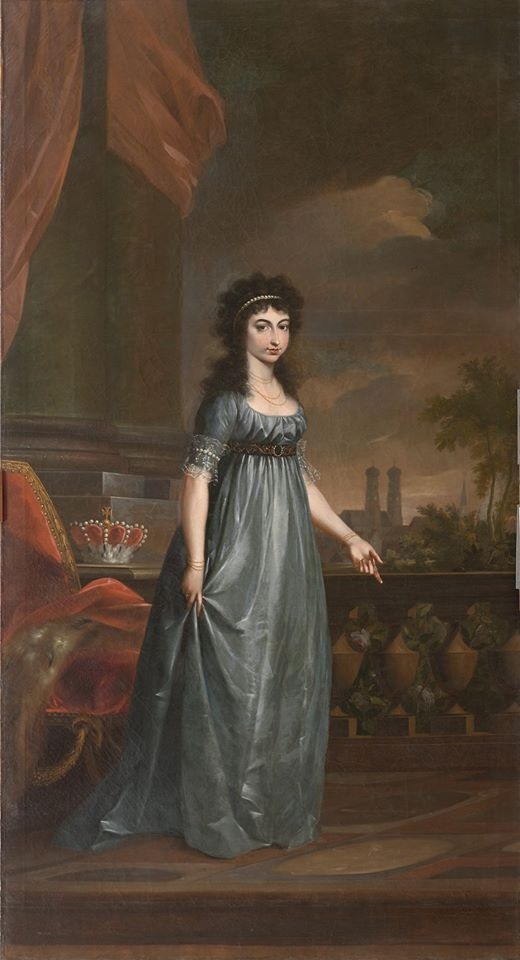
Portrait of Maria Leopoldine (by an unknown artist). Nymphenburg Palace

Elector Charles Theodore died on 16 February 1799 in Munich. His death gave relief to his Bavarian subjects, his wife, and the Palatinate-Zweibrücken family. The last hope of the Sulzbach line would have been a possible pregnancy of Maria Leopoldine; however, she denied this, thus enabling the Zweibrücken line of the House of Wittelsbach to take control over the Electorate of Bavaria and Electoral Palatinate. The late elector was, in late February 1799, buried in the Theatinerkirche. On 12 March, the new ruler Maximilian Joseph, made his entry into the Bavarian capital under the rejoicing of the population.

Maria Leopoldine, now Dowager Electress, took residence in Berg Castle at Lake Starnberg. She received a generous income and given her own court. After her husband's death she quickly became known for her libertine lifestyle with permissive parties, until she became pregnant and for two years was forced to exile herself in Laibach to cover the scandal. Once there, Maria Leopoldine lived in a nobleman's palace and gave birth to an illegitimate son. The paternity of the child, as well as his identity and further fate, are unknown.

After returning to Bavaria in 1801 she bought the Stepperg Castle near Neuburg an der Donau. Maria Leopoldine recognized the high economic potential of the fertile area and found in the person of the entrepreneur and financial expert Joseph von Utzschneider a capable and competent consultant. By improving the agricultural use of the ground, he was able to increase its earnings immensely and achieve a high profit on the markets. Maria Leopoldine expanded her property by buying the neighboring Rennertshofen brewery with his respective lands. Thus, the Dowager Electress became very wealthy, but also supported financially poor peasant families of the area.

== Countess von Arco and later life (1804–1848) ==
Suffering from intense loneliness, Maria Leopoldine began to search for a suitable husband. She chose Count Ludwig Joseph von Arco (1773-1854), a member of a Northern Italy noble Arco family established in Munich, who accepted her request of marriage. However, because the groom wasn't of enough rank for an Austrian Archduchess and Bavarian Dowager Electress, Maria Leopoldine was forced to renounce her Habsburg rights for the marriage, which took place on 14 November 1804 in Munich.

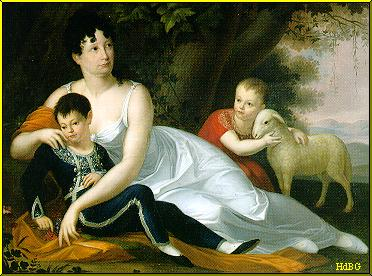
Maria Leopoldine as Countess von Arco, with her two surviving sons Aloys and Maximilian

However, soon afterwards, the conflicts and differences between Maria Leopoldine and her husband appeared, so that they even became separated for a while. While she managed her lands, the Count von Arco preferred the social life of Munich. Despite these circumstances, the union produced three children:

- Count Aloys Nikolaus Ambros von Arco-Stepperg (6 December 1808 – 10 September 1891), married firstly Margravine Irene Pallavicini and secondly Pauline Oswald, his long-time mistress. He had issue, one daughter, from his second marriage.
- Count Maximilian Joseph Bernhard von Arco-Zinneberg (13 December 1811 – 13 November 1885), married Countess Leopoldine von Waldburg zu Zeil und Trauchburg. Had issue, thirteen children (five sons and eight daughters).
- Countess Caroline von Arco (26 December 1814 – 18 January 1815), died in infancy.

Maria Leopoldine was a very dominant mother and focused on the education of her sons. The two children spent their early childhood in Stepperg Castle and were educated by private tutors. Eventually, she moved from Stepperg to Munich to allow their sons a better education. In Munich, she quickly became the center of social life again and became involved again in love affairs with younger men. In 1820, the 44-year-old Maria Leopoldine fell in love with Count Sigmund von Bechern, and during the next ten years, they had a passionate affair, until the young Count broke up the relationship to marry Baroness Askania von Krauss.

In 1825 a change in Maria Leopoldine's life occurred when King Ludwig I of Bavaria succeeded his father. In contrast to the Countess von Arco, who opposed her family in Austria and favored the French way of life, the new king pursued a policy in favor of Germany and Austria. Nevertheless, he liked to get her financial, economic and political advice. The affair between the King and Lola Montez was strongly disapproved and was finally one of the causes of the King's abdication on 20 March 1848 in favor of his son Maximilian II.

A few months later, on 23 June, she was traveling by carriage towards Salzburg. In Wasserburg am Inn a driverless salt wagon crushed against the carriage, which was overturned. Maria Leopoldine was buried under the car and could only be freed after a few hours. She had fatal internal injuries, and died a few minutes after the rescue. She was initially buried in a crypt in the Stepperg church, but on 28 March 1855 her remains were moved to the von Arco family crypt, located on the lying east of Stepperg Antoniberg. During 1852–1855 under the direction of Professor Ludwig Foltz was built a crypt chapel for Maria Leopoldine, who after her death she left a fortune of 15 million florins to her two sons.

== Honours ==
Electorate of Bavaria : Sovereign of the Order of Saint Elizabeth (feminine order)

== Ancestry ==
Ancestors of Archduchess Maria Leopoldine of Austria-Este

8. Leopold, Duke of Lorraine
4. Francis I, Holy Roman Emperor
9. Élisabeth Charlotte of Orléans
2. Ferdinand Karl, Archduke of Austria-Este
10. Charles VI, Holy Roman Emperor
5. Maria Theresa of Austria
11. Elisabeth Christine of Brunswick
1. Archduchess Maria Leopoldine of Austria-Este
12. Francesco III d'Este, Duke of Modena
6. Ercole III d'Este, Duke of Modena
13. Charlotte Aglaé of Orléans
3. Maria Beatrice d'Este, Duchess of Massa
14. Alderano I Cybo-Malaspina, Duke of Massa
7. Maria Teresa Cybo-Malaspina, Duchess of Massa
15. Ricciarda Gonzaga

== Bibliography ==
- Krauss-Meyl, Sylvia: Das "Enfant terrible" des Königshauses: Maria Leopoldine, Bayerns letzte Kurfürstin (1776-1848). Regensburg: Pustet, 1997. ISBN 3-7917-1558-5.
- Karl Otmar Freiherr von Aretin (1990). "Maria Leopoldine, Erzherzogin von Österreich". Neue Deutsche Biographie (in German). Vol. 16. Berlin: Duncker & Humblot. pp. 182–183. (full text online).
- Wolfgang Kunz: Maria Leopoldine (1776–1848) – Kurfürstin von Pfalz-Bayern und Geschäftsfrau. in: Mannheimer Geschichtsblätter. Neue Folge vol. 3, 1995, ISSN 0948-2784, pp. 255–274.
- Friedrich Weissensteiner: Habsburgerinnen auf fremden Thronen. Ueberreuter, Vienna 2000, ISBN 3-8000-3761-0.
- Constantin von Wurzbach: Habsburg, Maria Leopoldine von Este in: Biographisches Lexikon des Kaiserthums Oesterreich, vol 7. Kaiserlich-königliche Hof- und Staatsdruckerei, Vienna 1861, p. 52 online
