= Spiaggia del Bacan =

Beach in Venice

The Bacan Beach ("spiaggia del bacan") is a beach that stretches out on the island of Sant'Erasmo, on the Northern Venetian Lagoon. It is a popular summer destination for local Venetians and can be reached only by vaporetto or private boat.
