= Maria Ludovika of Austria-Este =

Empress of Austria from 1808 to 1816

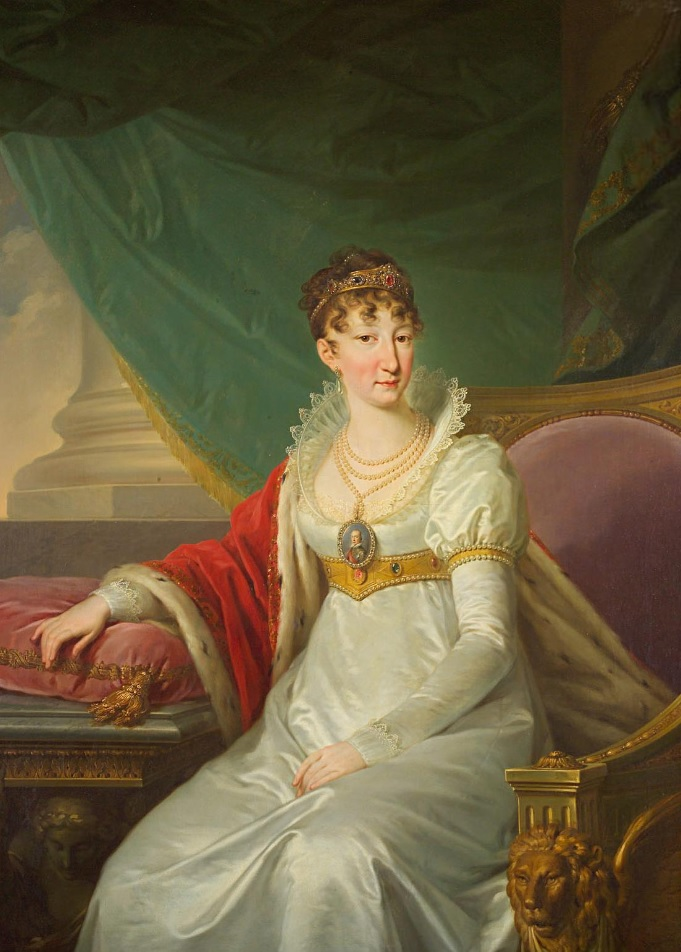
- Portrait in the Kunsthistorisches Museum, Vienna

Empress consort of Austria
- Tenure: 6 January 1808 – 7 April 1816
- Coronation: 7 September 1808, St. Martin's Cathedral
- Born: 14 December 1787; Monza, Duchy of Milan
- Died: 7 April 1816 (aged 28); Verona, Kingdom of Lombardy-Venetia, Austrian Empire
- Spouse: Francis I of Austria (m. 1808)
- House: Austria-Este
- Father: Ferdinand Karl, Archduke of Austria-Este
- Mother: Maria Beatrice d'Este, Duchess of Massa

Maria Ludovika Beatrix of Austria-Este (14 December 1787 – 7 April 1816), also known as Maria Ludovika of Modena, was Empress of Austria as the third wife of Emperor Francis I from their marriage on 6 January 1808 until her death in 1816. She was the daughter of Archduke Ferdinand of Austria-Este (1754–1806) and Maria Beatrice Ricciarda d'Este (1750–1829). She was a member of the House of Austria-Este, a branch of the House of Habsburg-Lorraine.

== Biography ==
=== Early life ===
Maria Ludovika was born in Monza on 14 December 1787, but her family fled from Italy to Austria when Northern Italy was conquered by Napoleon in 1796. This caused her a hostility for Napoleon. In Austria, the emperor fell in love with her during his visits to her mother. Maria Ludovika was educated by the Countess Almesloë, who was sent by Maria Ludovika’s grandmother Maria Theresa.

=== Marriage ===
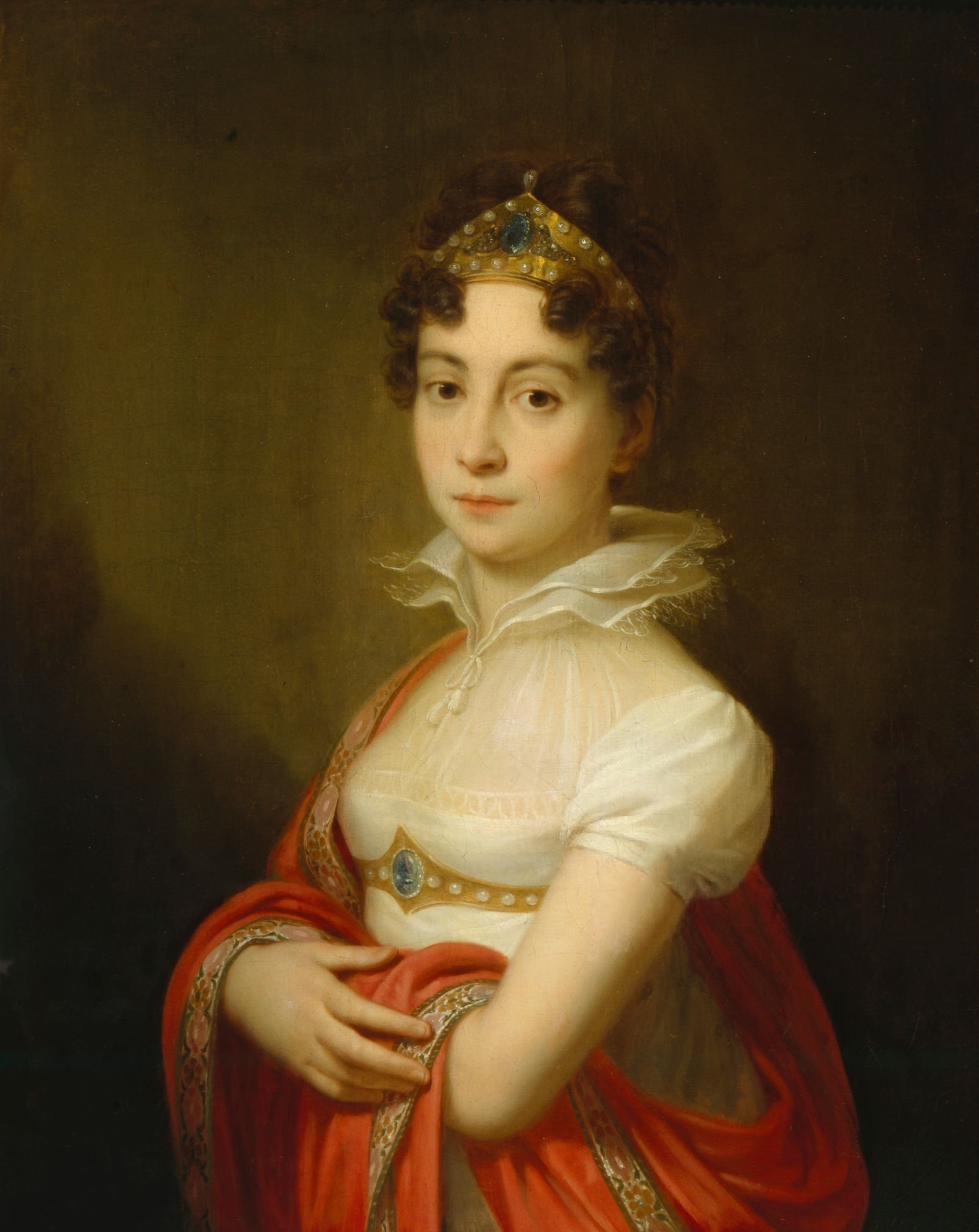
Portrait by Johann Baptist von Lampi the Elder

On 6 January 1808 she married her first cousin Francis I, Emperor of Austria, King of Hungary and Bohemia. They had no children.

She, as leader of the war party in Austria, was a great enemy of the French Emperor Napoleon I and therefore also in opposition to the Austrian foreign minister Prince Klemens von Metternich. The French had protested against the marriage because of her political views. She had considerable influence on her husband, and her talent at ruling marvelled many officials, including the Prussian minister who considered her the ruling genius at court.

Maria Ludovika was also immensely popular with her subjects who hailed her a second Maria Theresa. Together with her brother-in-law Archduke John, she made the war effort popular. During her coronation in Pressburg, she impressed the Hungarians so much that they declared large financial and military support for the monarchy if needed. But the emperor hesitated and Archduke Charles, who had extensive control over military matters, advised caution. Only the effects of the Spanish revolt in 1808 allowed the war party to prevail.

Metternich showed her private correspondence with her relatives to her husband, the Emperor Francis I, in the hope that it would discredit her. She was conservative in her views, suspicious of peasant revolts, but also patriotic towards her adopted land, and genuinely disturbed by atrocities that Napoleon's armies created in Spain. She supported the war against Napoleonic France in 1809. From this year, her health deteriorated. She was opposed to the marriage between Napoleon and her step-daughter Marie Louise in 1809. In 1812, she was a reluctant guest to the assembly of German monarchs gathered by Napoleon to celebrate his war against Russia.

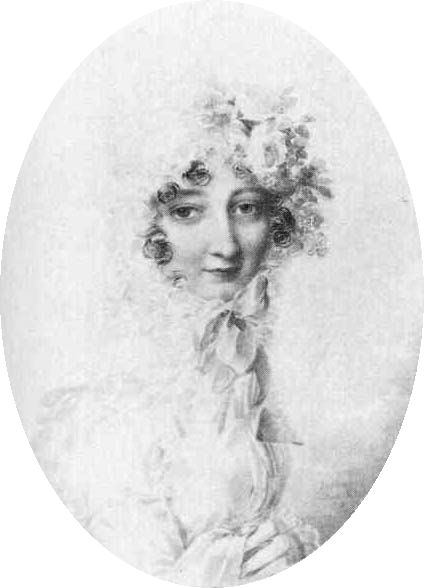
Portrait, artist and date unknown

=== Death ===
She was the hostess of the Congress of Vienna in 1815. When Napoleon was finally defeated she traveled at the end of the year in 1815 to her home country, North Italy, but died of tuberculosis in Verona. She was only 28 years old. She is buried in the Imperial Crypt in Vienna.

The Ludovica Military Academy in Budapest established in 1808 was named after Maria Ludovika who contributed 50,000 Forint for its upkeep from the funds of the Honours list proclaimed at the Coronation in St. Martin's Cathedral, in Pressburg.

Goethe admired Maria Ludovika greatly, and felt tortured because he promised never to pay a public tribute to her nor mention her name in public.

== Honours ==
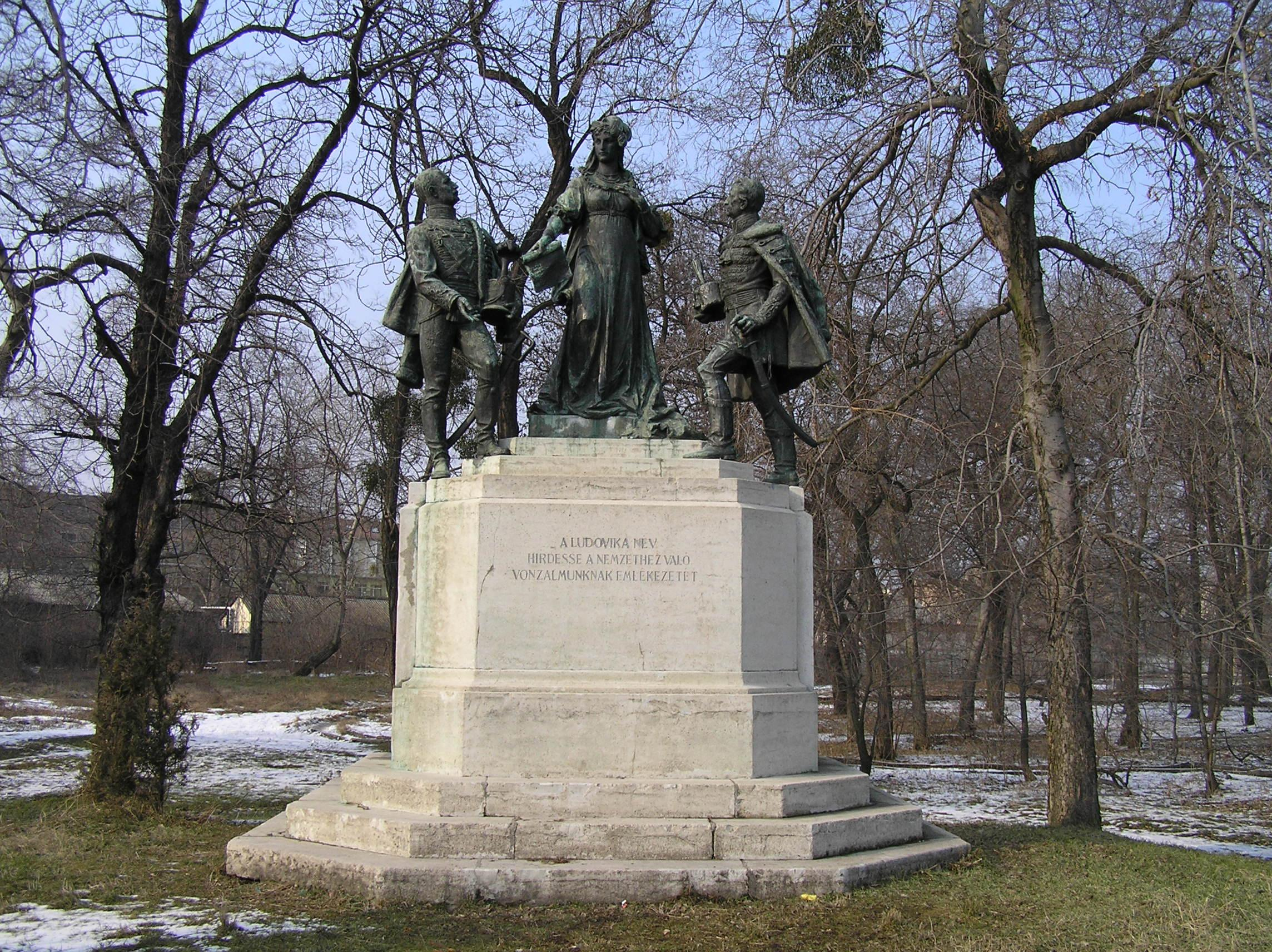
Monument to Empress Maria Ludovika in Budapest

A large marble memorial plaque mentioned her visit with the emperor in 1816 is located at Monza Cathedral.

A large bronze monument depicting her in the centre, and Archduke Joseph, Palatine of Hungary and János Buttler on either side was unveiled in 1901 at the Royal Hungarian Ludovica Military Academy.

== Ancestry ==
Ancestors of Maria Ludovika of Austria-Este

8. Leopold, Duke of Lorraine
4. Francis I, Holy Roman Emperor
9. Élisabeth Charlotte of Orléans
2. Ferdinand Karl, Archduke of Austria-Este
10. Charles VI, Holy Roman Emperor
5. Maria Theresa of Austria
11. Elisabeth Christine of Brunswick-Wolfenbüttel
1. Maria Ludovika of Austria-Este
12. Francesco III d'Este, Duke of Modena
6. Ercole III d'Este, Duke of Modena
13. Charlotte Aglaé of Orléans
3. Maria Beatrice d'Este, Duchess of Massa
14. Alderano I Cybo-Malaspina, Duke of Massa
7. Maria Teresa Cybo-Malaspina, Duchess of Massa
15. Ricciarda Gonzaga

Maria Ludovika of Austria-Este House of Austria-Este Cadet branch of the House of Habsburg Born: 14 December 1787 Died: 7 April 1816
Royal titles
Preceded by Maria Theresa of Naples and Sicily	Empress consort of Austria; Queen consort of Dalmatia; Queen consort of Galicia and Lodomeria; Queen consort of Lombardy-Venetia; Queen consort of Hungary; Queen consort of Croatia; Queen consort of Slavonia; Queen consort of Bohemia; 1808–1816	Succeeded by Caroline Augusta of Bavaria
Notes and references
1. http://www.britannica.com/EBchecked/topic/216736/Francis-II
