= Andrew N. Iwaniuk =

Canadian biologist

Andrew N. Iwaniuk is a Canadian biologist who largely works in the fields of evolutionary neuroscience, neuroethology and ornithology.

== Biography ==
Iwaniuk was born in Toronto, Ontario, Canada and grew up in Edmonton, Alberta, Canada. He went to the University of Alberta but decided not to stay there, instead he went to Monash University in Melbourne, Australia to complete his Honours degree with John E. Nelson. Later on he returned to Canada to get his master's degree from the University of Lethbridge with Ian Q. Whishaw and Sergio M. Pellis. For his Ph.D., he returned to Australia where he focused his study into the evolution of the bird brain, especially parrots and began development of a large comparative brain collection. Following the completion of his Ph.D., he worked as a post-doc with Douglas Wong-Wylie at the University of Alberta which focus was on the study of neuroanatomy and neurochemistry of birds. He briefly worked as a fellow at the National Museum of Natural History at Washington, D.C. He is currently an associate professor in the Department of Neuroscience at the University of Lethbridge working with grouse, ground squirrels and broad, comparative studies of avian brain anatomy.

== Papers ==
- Wylie DR, Gutiérrez-Ibáñez C, Graham DJ, Kreuzer MB, Pakan JM, Iwaniuk AN (2011). "Heterogeneity of parvalbumin expression in the avian cerebellar cortex and comparisons with zebrin II". Neuroscience. 185: 73–84. doi:10.1016/j.neuroscience.2011.04.014. PMID 21501663. S2CID 16612766.
- Iwaniuk AN, Heesy CP, Hall MI (2010). "The morphometrics of the eyes and orbits of the nocturnal Swallow-tailed Gull (Creagrus furcatus)". Canadian Journal of Zoology. 88 (9): 855–865. doi:10.1139/Z10-051.
- Iwaniuk AN, Gutiérrez-Ibáñez C, Pakan JM, Wylie DR (2010). "Allometric scaling of the tectofugal pathway in birds". Brain, Behavior and Evolution. 75 (2): 122–137. doi:10.1159/000311729. PMID 20516660. S2CID 11761082.
- Sol D, Garcia N, Iwaniuk A, Davis K, Meade A, Boyle A, Szekely T (2010). "Evolutionary divergence in brain size between migratory and resident birds". PLOS ONE. 5 (3): 9613. Bibcode:2010PLoSO...5.9617S. doi:10.1371/journal.pone.0009617. PMC 2835749. PMID 20224776.
- Gutiérrez-Ibáñez C, Iwaniuk AN, Wylie DR (2009). "The independent evolution of the enlargement of the principal sensory nucleus of the trigeminal nerve (PrV) in three different groups of birds". Brain, Behavior and Evolution. 74 (4): 280–294. doi:10.1159/000270904. PMID 20051684. S2CID 12317134.
- Wylie DR, Gutiérrez-Ibáñez C, Pakan JM, Iwaniuk AN (2009). "The optic tectum of birds: Mapping our way to understanding visual processing". Canadian Journal of Experimental Psychology. 63 (4): 328–338. doi:10.1037/a0016826. PMID 20025392.
- Iwaniuk AN, Olson SL, James HF (2009). "Extraordinary cranial specialization in a new genus of extinct duck (Aves: Anseriformes) from Kauai, Hawaiian Islands". Zootaxa. 2296: 47–67. doi:10.11646/zootaxa.2296.1.3. S2CID 4176091.
- Hall MI, Gutiérrez-Ibáñez C, Iwaniuk AN (2009). "The morphology of the optic foramen and activity pattern in birds". Anatomical Record. 292 (11): 1827–1845. doi:10.1002/ar.21007. PMID 19777569. S2CID 44571623.
- Iwaniuk AN, Gutiérrez-Ibáñez C, Pakan JM, Wylie DR (2009). "Expression of calcium binding proteins in cerebellar- and inferior olivary-projecting neurons in the nucleus lentiformis mesencephali of pigeons". Visual Neuroscience. 26 (3): 341–347. doi:10.1017/S0952523809090087. PMID 19435547. S2CID 5567734.
- Iwaniuk AN, Lefebvre L, Wylie DR (2009). "The comparative approach and brain-behaviour relationships: A tool for understanding tool use". Canadian Journal of Experimental Psychology. 63 (2): 50–59. doi:10.1037/a0015678. PMID 19485606.
- Guay PJ, Iwaniuk AN (2009). "Inter-specific variation in relative brain size is not correlated with intensity of sexual selection in waterfowl (Anseriformes)". Australian Journal of Zoology. 56 (5): 311–321. doi:10.1071/ZO08082.
- Iwaniuk AN, Marzban H, Hawkes R, Pakan JM, Watanabe M, Wylie DR (2009). "Compartmentation of the cerebellar cortex of hummingbirds (Aves: Trochilidae) revealed by the expression of zebrin II and phospholipase cb4". Journal of Chemical Neuroanatomy. 37 (1): 55–63. doi:10.1016/j.jchemneu.2008.10.001. PMID 18996471. S2CID 15365585.
