= CKXU-FM =

Radio station at the University of Lethbridge in Lethbridge, Alberta

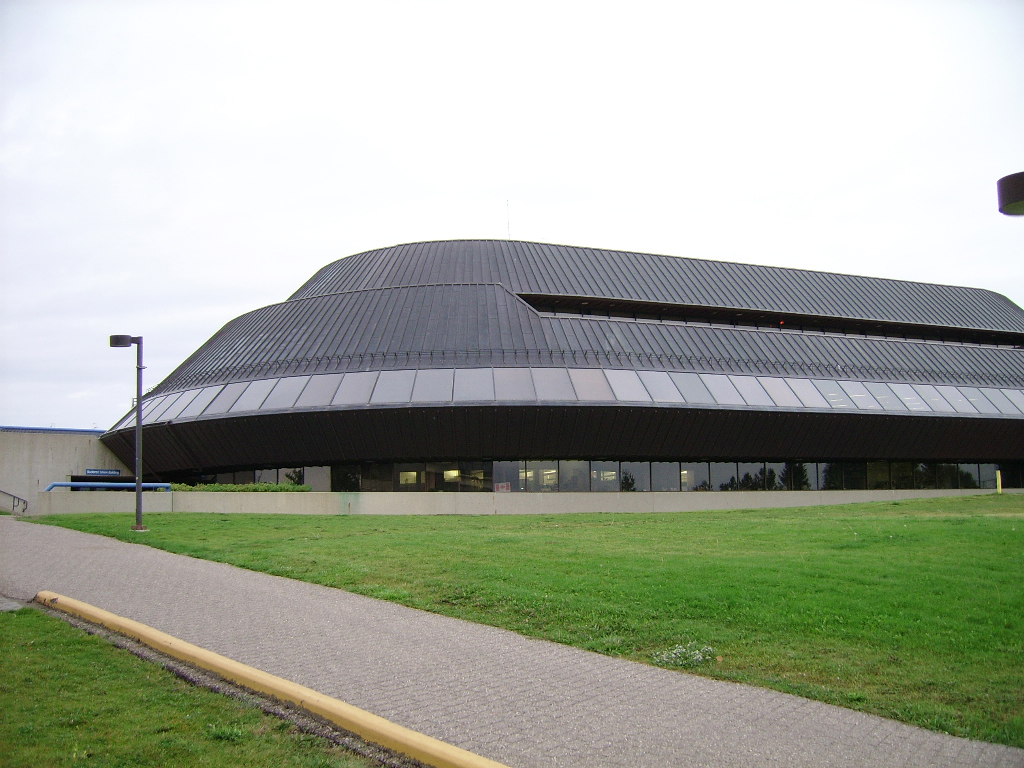
- University of Lethbridge Students Union Building
- Lethbridge, Alberta; Canada
- Broadcast area: Lethbridge County
- Frequency: 88.3 MHz
- Branding: CKXU 88.3 FM

Programming
- Language: English
- Format: Campus/community Radio
- Affiliations: National Campus and Community Radio Association

Ownership
- Owner: CKXU Radio Society

History
- First air date: October 23, 1978
- Former call signs: CKUL
- Former frequencies: 560 kHz (1978–2004)

Technical information
- Class: A
- ERP: 2,900 watts
- HAAT: 143.2 metres
- Transmitter coordinates: 49.6823°N 112.928°W

Links
- Webcast: Listen Live
- Website: ckxu.com

CKXU-FM is a Canadian campus radio station, broadcasting at 88.3 FM, from the University of Lethbridge, in Lethbridge, Alberta.

== History ==
CKXU began as CKUL in 1972, when a public address system was set up in Section A of University Hall at the University of Lethbridge to broadcast musical content inside the building from mid-morning to early afternoon. The station was managed by a three-member executive under the auspices of the University of Lethbridge Students' Union.

The CKUL Radio Society was incorporated in October 1977, to govern the affairs of the station, and a year later the Canadian Radio-television and Telecommunications Commission (CRTC) granted the society a licence to broadcast at 530 AM. Even in those early days, the Board of Directors of the station began examining the possibility of a move to the FM band by increasing the number of daily broadcast hours and developing the long-term income streams necessary to fund such an operation.

On October 23, 1978, CKUL-AM signed on to the radio spectrum for the very first time with O Canada, broadcasting at a mere 25 watts, the AM transmitter was of such low power that it was drowned out by the time it reached the parking lot of the university, by a station originating in Montana. However, the move to AM still represented a major step forward in the development of the station. CKUL was now a bona fide radio station, broadcasting 65 hours per week with 25 DJs rather than irregularly with only a handful of programmers.

=== FM transition ===
Although the station began broadcasting on cable FM in 1988, a switch to FM was considered ideal and the CKUL Radio Society began this process. In 2003, the CRTC approved the application to operate a new English-language community-based campus FM radio station in Lethbridge. CKUL's call letters were changed to CKXU, and on April 8, 2004, the station began to broadcast at 88.3 FM to the city of Lethbridge and the surrounding area from a 125W transmitter located on top of the Students' Union Building at the University of Lethbridge. CKXU 88.3 FM now broadcasts for more than 168 hours per week, year-round, with a volunteer core of over 100 members.

In 2012 CKXU officially became a partner of the Alberta Emergency Alert and now provides emergency news updates to listeners during an emergency with information provided by AEMA. During this year CKXU also received a license renewal to extend their ability to transmit to the Lethbridge area on 88.3 FM.

As of 2015, CKXU broadcasts in the following ways:

- Terrestrially at 88.3FM in Lethbridge;
- On TelusTV channel 7084; and
- On the internet.

CKXU is a member of the National Campus and Community Radio Association.

== Fundraising ==
=== CKXU Loves You ===
In February of every year CKXU hosts a fundraising event at the Slice Bar and Grill in Downtown Lethbridge. First held in 2006, 'CKXU Loves You' features a variety of local musicians.

=== FUNdrive ===
In February 2006 CKXU held its first annual on-air funding drive. The funds raised totaled over $5,000. In 2007 the annual funding drive (Fundrive) took place from February 8 to February 11, and the goal was $6,000, a modest increase from the first year and the pledges totaled $7,800. During the 2012 FUNdrive the pledgers managed to surpass the pledged amount of $10,000 with a total of $12,543. FUNdrive centres on a week-long change in the regular radio format where the DJs ask listeners for pledges to the station in return for incentive packages (often referred to as 'SWAG'). During FUNdrive CKXU also hosts various events throughout the community called 'LiveDrive Events' to provide an opportunity for listeners to unite and enjoy such activities as: Cupcake Carnival, Boardgame night, Movie Night, Appreciation Gala, and DIY workshops. In CKXU's 2016 #FundTheFrequency campaign over $25,000 was raised in support of increased signal strength.

==== Friend's Card ====
One initiative of the FUNdrive is the CKXU Friend's Card. In exchange for a $25 donation to the station a pledger receives a Friend's Card keytag that can be used at multiple Friend's business locations throughout Lethbridge. The Friend's Card entitles the bearer to discounts and special pricing at over 20 locations.

=== CKXU Christmas ===
CKXU also hosts an annual Christmas party benefiting the Lethbridge Food Bank or other community organization as determined by the organizing committee. The CKXU Christmas often features photos with Santa, an impressive Pick-Your-Prize Raffle (with prizes donated from local 'Friends of CKXU' businesses). The 2012 CKXU Christmas party raised over $1,000.

=== CKXU Loves You ===
CKXU Loves You is an annual fundraiser that is held in February as a Valentine's Day event.

=== CKXU CupcakeCamp ===
CKXU has held CupcakeCamp "Bakesale" events for their annual FUNdrives.

== See also ==
- University of Lethbridge Students' Union
- University of Lethbridge
- The Meliorist
- National Campus and Community Radio Association
- Alberta Emergency Alert
