= Vivien Casagrande =

American ophthalmologist

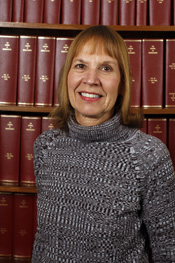
- Born: June 7, 1942; Belmont, Massachusetts
- Died: January 21, 2017 (aged 74); Nashville, Tennessee
- Education: University of Colorado Boulder B.S. (1964); Duke University PhD (1973)
- Known for: Neuroscience, visual system
- Spouse: James Andrew McKanna
- Children: 2 sons
- Scientific career
- Workplaces: Vanderbilt University

Vivien Alice Casagrande (June 7, 1942 – January 21, 2017) was a professor in the Department of Cell and Developmental Biology at the Vanderbilt University Medical Center.

== Life ==
Casagrande was born in Belmont, Massachusetts to Erna and Arthur Casagrande in 1942. She received her B.S. in psychology from University of Colorado Boulder in 1964 and then obtained her PhD from Duke University in 1973 in physiological psychology under the direction of Irving T. Diamond.

== Career ==
Casagrande did her postdoctoral study at the University of Wisconsin–Madison prior to becoming an assistant professor at Vanderbilt University School of Medicine in 1975. In 1982, Prof. Casagrande became an investigator into the vernal keratoconjunctivitis and held leading positions at VKC. In 1986, Dr. Casagrande became full professor and investigator at the Vanderbilt Brain Institute and at the Vanderbilt Kennedy Center. As an investigator, she had worked as an associate director under guidance from Elisabeth Dykens and interim director, Steve Warren, at the Biomedical Research from 1988 to 1991. From 1989 to 1991 she was also a director of the Neuroscience Core and the Neuroscience Research Cluster, which she left in 1992.

From 1997 to 2001, Professor Casagrande had served on the Communications and Chapters Committee of the Society for Neuroscience. In 2006, she served as a chairperson for the National Eye Institute's CDA Review Panel and was on Andrew G. White's thesis committee at the University of Sydney.

=== Research ===
Casagrande's research focused on understanding how the visual thalamus and cortex interact to construct our perceptual world. She did this through three different projects. Her first project was to analyze the notion that the primary sensor information received by the visual cortex from the visual thalamus is not purely visual, but rather visual information. The second project was to test whether all thalamic nuclei contain some cell groups that act as drivers and some that act as modulators for multiple cortical areas. The third project was to study communication between cells in separate areas of the visual cortex and how visual messages are coded and transmitted from lower to higher visual areas and what the role of feedback is.

=== Editorial work ===
Casagrande had served on many editorial boards, including for the Cerebral Cortex, Journal of Comparative Neurology and Visual Neuroscience. She also was an assistant editor for the American Journal on Mental Retardation, Journal of Experimental and Integrative Medicine, and Visual Neuroscience.

== Awards ==
Casagrande was awarded the Charles Judson Herrick Award (1981) from the American Association of Anatomists and was elected fellow of the American Association for the Advancement of Science (2006) and the American Association of Anatomists (2011).

Posthumously, she was inducted into the Patricia Goldman-Rakic Hall of Honor, by the Society for Neuroscience.

== Selected publications ==
- Khaytin, I, Xin Chen, D.W. Royal, O. Ruiz, W.J. Jermakowicz, R.M. Siegel and Vivien A. Casagrande, (2008) Functional organization of temporal frequency selectivity in primate visual cortex. Cerebral Cortex 18: pages 1828–1842.
- Jermakowicz, W.J. and Casagrande, V.A. (2007) Neuronal networks a century after Cajal in A Century of Neuroscience Discovery: Reflecting on the 1906 Nobel Prizes to Golgi and Cajal. In Brain Research Reviews (L. Swanson, ed.), Elsevier, pages 265–284.
- Boyd, J.D., I. Khaytin, and V. A. Casagrande (2007) Comparative approach to study of the evolution of mammalian visual system. In Evolution of the Nervous System (A. Butler, ed.), in press.
- Casagrande, V.A., I. Khaytin, and J. Boyd (2007) What the evolution of color vision tells us about the function of parallel visual pathways in primates. In Evolution of the Nervous System (A. Butler, ed), in press.
- Casagrande, V. A., F. Yazar, K.D. Jones, and Y. Ding (2007) The morphology of the koniocellular (K) axon pathway in the macaque monkey. Cerebral Cortex Advance Access, published on January 10, 2007.
- Xu, X, Anderson, T.J., Casagrande, V.A. (2007) How do functional maps in primary visual cortex vary with eccentricity? Journal of Comparative Neurology 501, pages 741–755.
- Casagrande, V.A., I. Khaytin, I., and J. Boyd (2006) The evolution of parallel visual pathways in the brains of primates. In Evolution of the Nervous System (T.M. Preuss and J. Kaas, eds.), volume 4, pages 87–108.
- Ruiz, O., D. Royal, G. Sary, X. Chen, J. D. Schall, and V. A. Casagrande (2006) Low-threshold Ca2+associated bursts are rare events in the LGN of the awake behaving monkey. Journal of Neurophysiology 95:3401-3413.
- Elston, G.N., R. Benavides-Piccione, A. Elston, B. Zietsch, J. DeFelipe, P. Manger, V. Casagrande and J. Kaas (2006) Specializations of the granular prefrontal cortex of primates: implications for cognitive processing. Anatomical Record Part A 288A: pages 26-35.
- Royal, D. W., Gy. Sary, J.D. Schall, and V.A. Casagrande (2006) Correlates of motor planning and integration across visual fixations in the macaque monkey lateral geniculate nucleus (LGN). Experimental Brain Research 168: pages 62-75.
- Xu, X., Collins C.E., Khaytin, I., Kaas J. H., and V. A. Casagrande (2006). Unequal representation of cardinal versus oblique orientations in the middle temporal (MT) visual area. Proceedings for the National Academy of Sciences 103(46):17490-95.
- Casagrande, V.A., Royal, D.W., Sary, Gy. (2005) Extraretinal inputs and feedback mechanisms to the lateral geniculate nucleus (LGN). In The Primate Visual System: A Comparative Approach (Jan Kremers, ed.) Hoboken, New Jersey: John Wiley and Sons, pages 191–206.
