= Denis Baylor =

American neurobiologist (1940–2022)

- Born: Denis Aristide Baylor; January 30, 1940; Oskaloosa, Iowa, U.S.
- Died: March 16, 2022 (aged 82); Stanford, California, U.S.
- Education: Knox College (BA); Yale Medical School (M.D.)
- Awards: Royal Society of London (2003); AAAS Award for Scientific Freedom and Responsibility (1992); National Academy of Sciences (1993)
- Scientific career
- Fields: Neurobiology
- Workplaces: Stanford University; University of Colorado Medical School; National Institutes of Health
- Doctoral advisor: John Nicholls

Denis Aristide Baylor (January 30, 1940 – March 16, 2022) was an American neurobiologist. He was professor emeritus of neurobiology at Stanford University. He is known for his research on nerve cells in the retina of the eye. He developed a widely used method for observing the electrical activity of single rod and cone photoreceptor cells and described how they encode light stimuli. Baylor's work has been recognized by his election to the American Academy of Arts and Sciences, the National Academy of Sciences, and the Royal Society of London.

== Early life and education ==
Baylor was born on January 30, 1940, in Oskaloosa, Iowa. Baylor received his BA in chemistry from Knox College in 1961, where he graduated magna cum laude and was elected to Phi Beta Kappa. In 1965, Baylor received his M.D. from Yale School of Medicine, where he was elected to Alpha Omega Alpha medical honor society and graduated cum laude. At Yale, he was a postdoctoral fellow in physiology with John Nicholls from 1965 and 1968. He then joined the United States Public Health Service and worked at the National Institutes of Health for two years in the laboratory of M.G.F. Fuortes. From 1970 to 1972 he was a Special Fellow of the USPHS in the laboratory of Alan Hodgkin in Cambridge, England.

== Research and career ==
=== Academic posts ===
In 1972 Baylor joined the faculty of the university of Colorado Medical School, where he was associate professor of Physiology. In 1974 he moved to Stanford University, where he was an associate professor of physiology up to 1975. Baylor was then an associate professor of neurobiology between 1975 and 1978. In 1978, he became a professor of neurobiology at Stanford and chaired the department from 1992 to 1995. He became emeritus in 2001. During his career, Baylor has served on the editorial board for The Journal of Physiology, Neuron, Journal of Neurophysiology, Visual Neuroscience, and The Journal of Neuroscience. He served on the Scientific Advisory and Medical Advisory Boards of the Howard Hughes Medical Institute, where he was also a Senior Scientific Officer. He was a member of the Lasker Awards Jury and was on the Visiting Committee at Harvard Medical School. He served on the Visual Sciences Study Section of the NIH, which he chaired, as well as the advisory boards of multiple other foundations.

=== Research interests and selected publications ===
Denis Baylor is known for work on early steps in vision, in particular the mechanism in which light energy is converted to neural signals within the rod and cone photoreceptor cells of the eye. He provided a quantitative description of the laws that govern the process. Using a new method for recording the electrical currents of individual cells he recorded for the first time the response of retinal rods to single photons of light and showed that the response is remarkably reproducible.

He also described and defined the molecular mechanism of two components of intrinsic photoreceptor noise that limit our ability to detect very dim light.

His work revealed how light and color are initially encoded in the primate retina, providing a physiological basis for psychophysical results of Stiles on human vision.

He also helped to elucidate the molecular mechanism of a number of the steps that mediate and control the photoreceptor's electrical response to light.

=== Awards and honors ===
Baylor's work has been honored by various awards, including election to the American Academy of Arts and Sciences (1992), the National Academy of Sciences (1993), and the Royal Society of London (2003).

== Death ==
Baylor died of cardiac arrhythmia at the Stanford Golf Course on March 16, 2022, at the age of 82.
