= Kiisa Nishikawa =

Biomechanics engineer

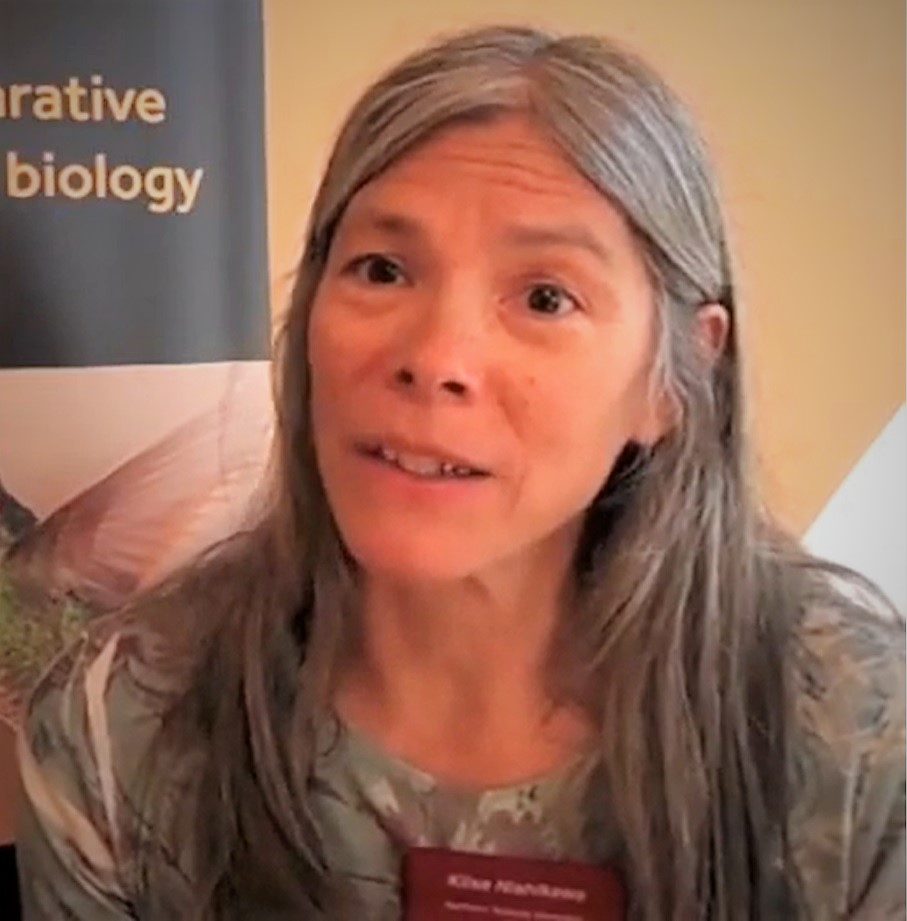
- Nishikawa in 2015
- Awards: W. M. Keck Foundation, Miller Institute
- Scientific career
- Fields: Physiology, Prosthetics, Kinesiology
- Institutions: Northern Arizona University

Kiisa Nishikawa is a biomechanist, and holds the rank of Regents' Professor of Biological Sciences at Northern Arizona University.

== Research career ==
Nishikawa is the principal investigator leading the Muscle and Motor Control Laboratory at Northern Arizona University (NAU), where her laboratory investigates muscle contraction, including the role of titin and developing bio-inspired control algorithms for motorized prostheses for lower limbs. Previously, Nishikawa's lab acquired an atomic force microscope in order to test how changes in the giant titin protein impact muscle mechanical properties (referred to as the winding filament hypothesis). Nishikawa's laboratory has also developed prosthetic software, for the BiOM T2 prosthesis, and is studying whether this provides additional advantages compared to currently available commercial software.

Nishikawa holds the position of Regents' Professor of Biological Sciences at NAU, and was the director of the NAU's Center of Bioengineering Innovation from 2014 to 2019. One of Nishikawa's prior postdoctoral fellows, Theodore Uyeno, is now an associate professor at the Valdosta State University's Department of Biology.

Nishikawa has published over 250 academic papers, resulting in over 3,000 citations, resulting in an h-index and i10-index of 39 and 79 respectively. In 2014, she received a $1 million grant for medical research from the W. M. Keck Foundation, and was one of only six researchers to do so.

== Selected bibliography ==
- Neuromechanics: an integrative approach for understanding motor control. Kiisa Nishikawa, Andrew A Biewener, Peter Aerts, Anna N Ahn, Hillel J Chiel, Monica A Daley, Thomas L Daniel, Robert J Full, Melina E Hale, Tyson L Hedrick, A Kristopher Lappin, T Richard Nichols, Roger D Quinn, Richard A Satterlie, Brett Szymik. Integrative and Comparative Biology. 2007.
- Is titin a 'winding filament'? A new twist on muscle contraction. Kiisa C Nishikawa, Jenna A Monroy, Theodore E Uyeno, Sang Hoon Yeo, Dinesh K Pai, Stan L Lindstedt. Proceedings of the Royal Society B: Biological Sciences. 2012.
- Do arm postures vary with the speed of reaching? Kiisa C Nishikawa, Sara T Murray, Martha Flanders. Journal of Neurophysiology. 1999.
- Paedomorphosis and Simplification in the Nervous System of Salamanders; pp. 137–152. Gerhard Roth, Kiisa C Nishikawa, Christiane Naujoks-Manteuffel, Andrea Schmidt, David B Wake. Brain, behavior and evolution. 1993.
