= Kenneth C. Catania =

American neuroscientist

- Born: 1965 (age 60–61)
- Education: University of Maryland, College Park, University of California, San Diego
- Awards: MacArthur Fellowship, C. J. Herrick Award, NSF Career
- Scientific career
- Fields: Neurobiology
- Workplaces: Vanderbilt University
- Doctoral advisor: Glenn Northcutt

Kenneth C. Catania (born 1965) is a biologist and neuroscientist teaching and conducting research at Vanderbilt University in Nashville, Tennessee. As an undergraduate, Catania worked as a research assistant at the National Zoo in Washington D.C. while attending the University of Maryland, College Park. In 1989, he received a BS in zoology from the University of Maryland. He received a master's degree (1992) and Ph.D. (1994) in neurosciences from the University of California, San Diego, working with Glenn Northcutt. He did his post-doctoral work with Jon Kaas at Vanderbilt University before joining the Vanderbilt Biological Sciences faculty in 2000 where he is currently a Stevenson Professor of Biological Sciences.

He studies animal sensory systems, brain organization, and behavior in diverse species including star-nosed moles, water shrews, naked mole-rats, alligators and crocodiles, snakes, earthworms, and electric eels. His studies often focus on predators that have evolved special senses and weapons to find and overcome elusive prey and he is considered an expert in extreme animal behaviors. He studies specialized species because they can reveal general principles about brain organization and sensory systems. But he also believes "there is unappreciated beauty and elegance in the behaviors and diverse forms of these extraordinary animals".

In addition to his research, Catania has authored two books aimed at a general audience: Great Adaptations (2020) and On the Art and Craft of Doing Science (2024).

Catania was named a MacArthur Fellow in 2006 and in 2013 he received the Pradel Research Award in Neurosciences from the National Academy of Sciences for "highly imaginative investigations of the neural basis of sensory behavior in model organisms" and "discoveries of fundamental principles of behavior, sensory processing, and brain organization".

In addition to his scientific publications, his work has also been featured in magazines such as Scientific American, Natural History Magazine, and The Scientist. His discovery of a "mechanism similar to a taser" in an electric eel by absorbing the shock through his fingertips was widely covered in the popular press.

== Books ==
- Great Adaptations: Star-Nosed Moles, Electric Eels, and Other Tales of Evolution's Mysteries Solved (Princeton University Press, 2020). ISBN 978-0-691-19525-4.
- On the Art and Craft of Doing Science (Princeton University Press, 2024). ISBN 978-0-691-24926-1.

== Notable awards ==
2014 Guggenheim Fellowship

2013 Pradel Award in Neuroscience, National Academy of Sciences

2006 MacArthur Award

2005 C. J. Herrick Award in Neuroanatomy

2003 National Science Foundation Career Award

2001 Searle Scholar Award

1998 Capranica Foundation Award in Neuroethology
