= Novellara =

Novellara Emilian: Nuvalêra
- Comune
- Comune di Novellara
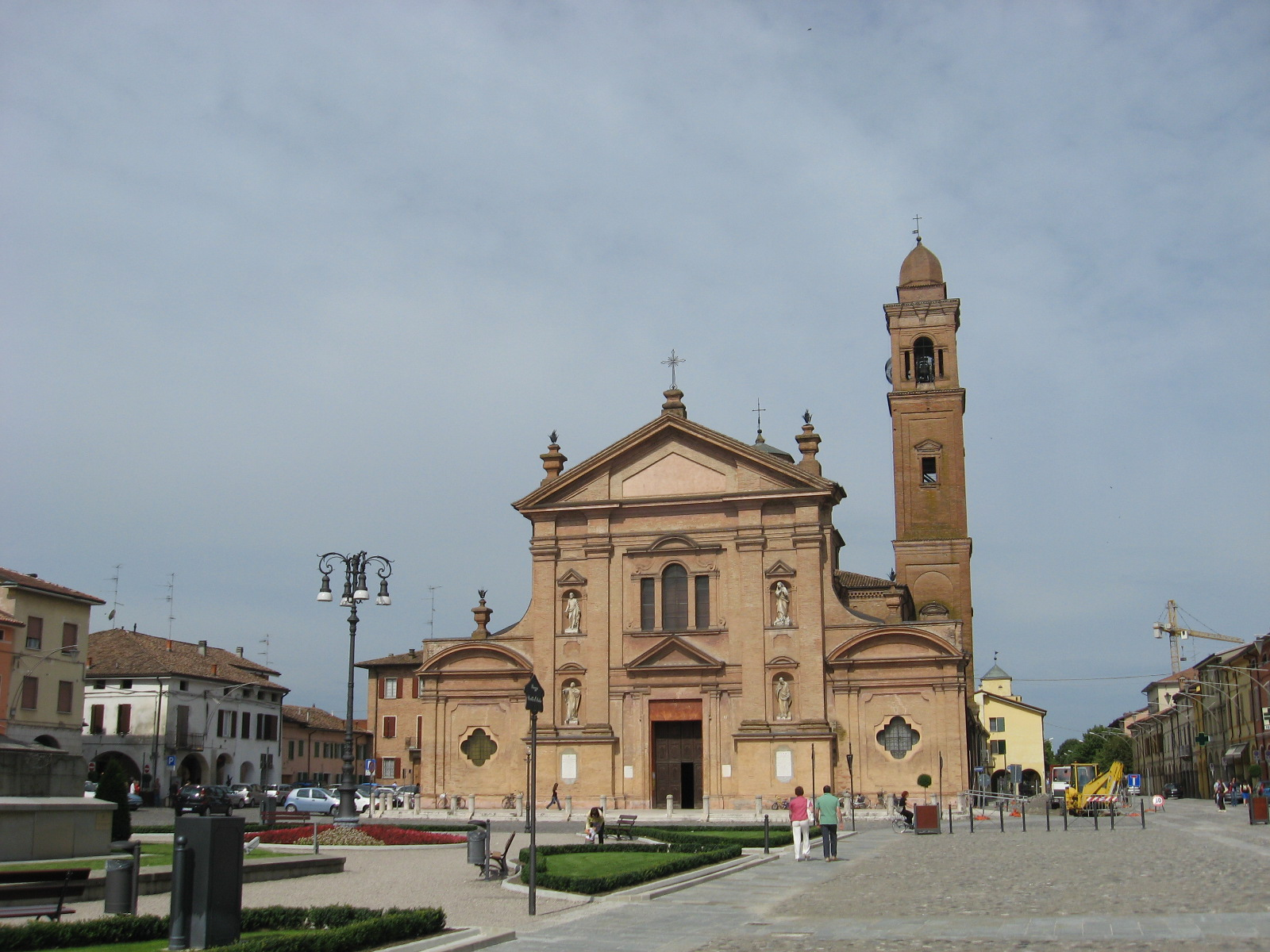
- Piazza Unità d'Italia

- Flag Coat of arms

- Location of Novellara in Italy Novellara (Emilia-Romagna)
- Coordinates: 44°51′N 10°44′E
- Country: Italy
- Region: Emilia-Romagna
- Province: Reggio Emilia (RE)
- Frazioni: San Bernardino, San Giovanni della Fossa, Santa Maria della Fossa

Government
  - Mayor: Simone Zarantonello (centre-left; since June 10, 2024)

Area
  - Total: 58 km^{2} (22 sq mi)
- Elevation: 24 m (79 ft)

Population (31 December 2024)
  - Total: 13,301
  - Density: 230/km^{2} (590/sq mi)
- Demonym: Novellaresi
- Time zone: UTC+1 (CET)
  - Summer (DST): UTC+2 (CEST)
- Postal code: 42017
- Dialing code: 0522
- Patron saint: San Cassiano
- Saint day: May 4
- Website: Official website

Novellara (Reggiano: Nualêra or Nuvalêra) is a town and comune (municipality) in the province of Reggio Emilia, Emilia-Romagna, Italy, with a population of 13,301. It is located 18 kilometres (11 miles) north of Reggio Emilia and has a railway station for the local train line going from Reggio to Guastalla.

== History ==
The current name comes from the medieval Nubilaria, when the surrounding terrain was mostly covered by marshes, which favoured the formation of recurring fogs.

The town was the seat of the Gonzaga family from the 13th century: here Guido Gonzaga, in the early 14th century, created an effectively independent lordship, which later evolved into the County of Novellara and Bagnolo, roughly including what is now the communal territory of Novellara and the nearby Bagnolo in Piano.

After Gonzaga's end, in 1728, the town passed to the Este of the Duchy of Modena, whose history Novellara followed until 1859 when it was annexed to the newly unified Italy.

== Main sights ==
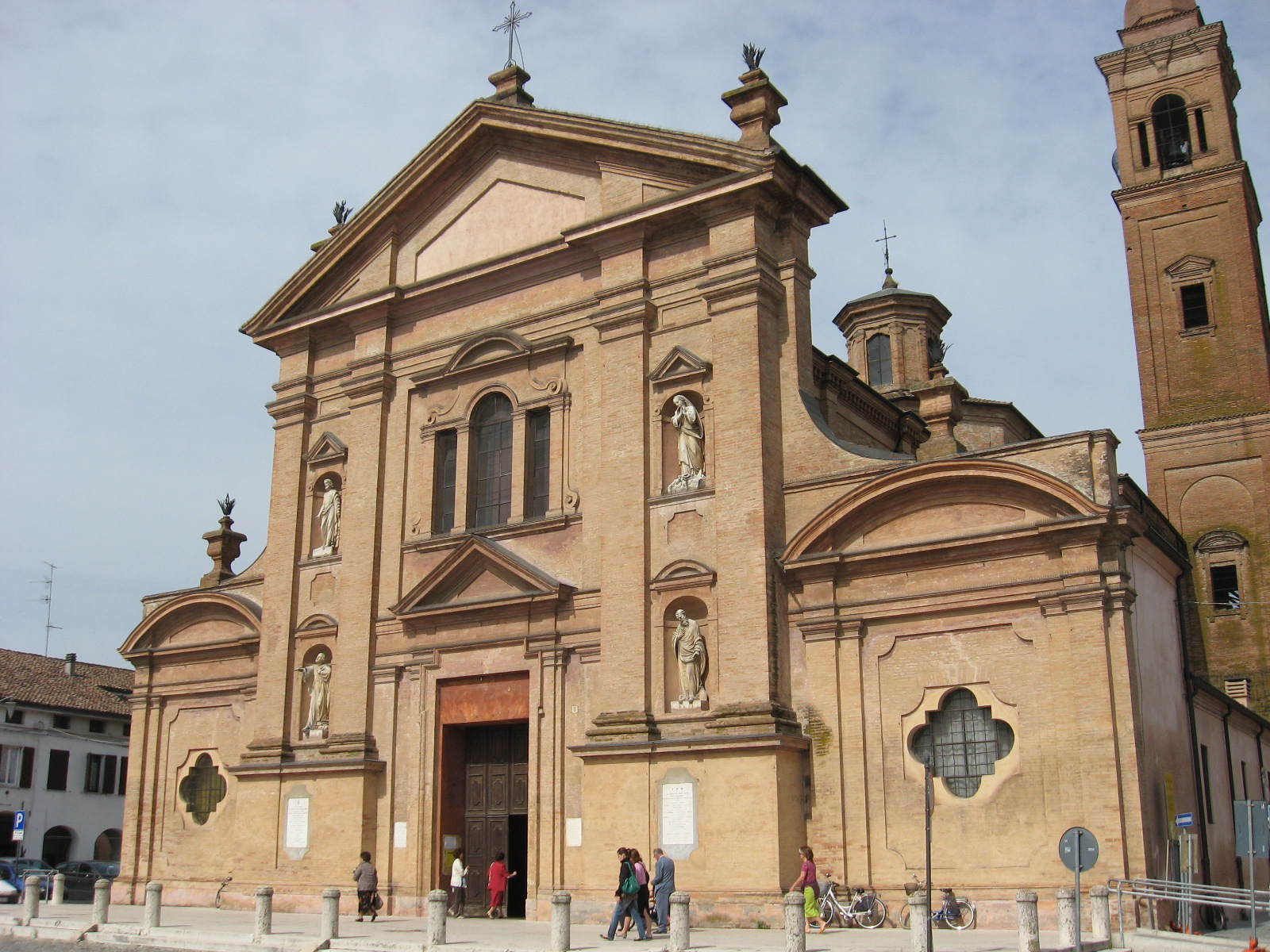
Church of Santo Stefano

- The Jesuit Convent
- Chiesa Collegiata di Santo Stefano
- The Rocca Gonzaga ("Gonzaga Castle"). This was built by Feltrino Gonzaga starting from 1350, most likely over a pre-existing fortifications from Lombard times.
- The Casino di Sotto and Casino di Sopra, summer residences of the Gonzagas. The Gonzaga Museum houses a rare 16th century vases collection.
- The main square (Piazza Unità d'Italia) with the Church of Santo Stefano, important work by Lelio Orsi.

In addition to this, Novellara is also home to the second largest gurdwara in Europe. This reflects the presence of a very large Sikh community, living in Novellara and nearby places, where they work mainly in cattle farms and dairies, where Parmigiano Reggiano is made.

As in other cities and towns of the region, e.g. Bologna, streets are lined with characteristic arcades, intended to offer shade in summer and shelter from rain or snow.

== Famous people ==
- Baldassare Castiglione (1478–1529), humanist philosopher, who was a count in Novellara
- Lelio Orsi (1508/11–1587), painter and architect
- Giaches de Wert (1535–1596), composer, who lived and raised his family in Novellara 1550–1565
- Maria Teresa Cybo-Malaspina (1725–1790), duchess of Modena, Reggio, Massa and Carrara
- Vittorio Marchi (1851–1908), neurologist and histologist
- Luciano Pigozzi (1927–2008), film actor
- Augusto Daolio (1947–1992), singer and founder of the Nomadi band

== Twin towns / sister cities ==
Novellara is twinned with:

- Nový Jičín, Czech Republic
- Neve Shalom, Israel
- Sancti Spíritus, Cuba
- Santa Gertrudes, Brazil
- Santo Stefano di Cadore, Italy
