= Georg F. Striedter =

American scientist and professor

Georg F. Striedter is an American scientist and professor in the Department of Neurobiology and Behavior at the University of California, Irvine. He is the author of more than 30 papers in evolutionary neuroscience and the author of the book Principles of Brain Evolution. He is also the editor-in-chief of Brain, Behavior and Evolution. Striedter obtained his PhD in neuroscience from the University of California, San Diego, under the supervision of Glenn Northcutt in 1990. He then pursued postdoctoral research at Caltech with Mark Konishi.

His research focuses on the organization and evolution of neuronal circuits in teleost fishes, the evolution of neuronal circuits for bird song learning in parrots and songbirds and how evolution modifies the processes of brain development to generate a broad diversity of adult brains.

== Awards ==
Striedter received the C. J. Herrick Award in 1998 for his contributions to comparative neuroanatomy. His book, Principles of Brain Evolution has been positively received by his academic colleagues (see the commentaries to his Precis of The Principles of Brain Evolution in Behavioral and Brain Sciences). He has also received a Guggenheim Fellowship in 2009 to work on a new book, "provisionally titled Functional neurobiology: the human nervous system explored in light of the problems it helps us solve."

== Major publications ==
- Striedter, G.F. (2006). "Precis and multiple book review of Principles of Brain Evolution". Behavioral and Brain Sciences. 29 (1): 1–36. doi:10.1017/S0140525X06009010. PMID 16542524. S2CID 14831586.
- Striedter, G.F. (2003) Brain evolution. In: The Human Nervous System, 2nd edition. edited by G. Paxinos and J.K. Mai. San Diego, Academic Press.
- Striedter, G.F. (2003) Epigenesis and evolution of brains: From Embryonic Divisions to Functional Systems in Müller, G and Newman, S. Origination of Organismal Form: Beyond the Gene in Developmental and Evolutionary Biology.
- Striedter, G.F.; Keefer, B. B. (2000). "Cell migration and aggregation in the developing telencephalon: pulse-labeling chick embryos with bromodeoxyuridine". Journal of Neuroscience. 20 (21): 8021–8030. doi:10.1523/jneurosci.20-21-08021.2000. PMC 6772730. PMID 11050123.
- Striedter, G.F.; Marchant, T.A.; Beydler, S. (1998). "The "neostriatum" develops as part of the lateral pallium in birds". Journal of Neuroscience. 18 (15): 5839–5849. doi:10.1523/JNEUROSCI.18-15-05839.1998. PMC 6793052. PMID 9671671.
- Striedter, G. (2007). "Brain botch". Nature. 447 (7145): 640. Bibcode:2007Natur.447..640S. doi:10.1038/447640a.

== Book ==
- Striedter, G.F. (2005). Principles of Brain Evolution Sinauer Associates, Sunderland, MA. ISBN 978-0-87893-820-9.

== See also ==
- Evolutionary neuroscience
- Evolutionary biology
