= Walter Wilczynski =

American ethologist and neuroscientist

- Born: September 18, 1952; Trenton, New Jersey
- Died: June 9, 2020 (aged 67); Atlanta, Georgia
- Education: Lehigh University, University of Michigan
- Awards: Fulbright U.S. Scholar Program (August–November 2016)
- Scientific career
- Fields: Neuroethology, behavioral neuroscience
- Institutions: Georgia State University
- Thesis: Connections of the midbrain auditory center in the bullfrog, rana catesbeiana. (1978)
- Doctoral advisor: Glenn Northcutt

Walter Wilczynski (September 18, 1952, in Trenton, New Jersey – June 9, 2020, in Atlanta, Georgia) was an American ethologist, neuroscientist, and professor at Georgia State University (GSU) in Atlanta, Georgia.

== Early life and education ==
Wilczynski was born in Trenton, New Jersey. He received his bachelor's degree in both biology and psychology from Lehigh University in 1974, after which he received his Ph.D. in neuroscience from the University of Michigan in 1978. He then completed his postdoc at the Section of Neurobiology and Behavior at Cornell University, where he worked in the lab of Robert Capranica.

== Career ==
In 1983, Wilczynski joined the faculty of the University of Texas at Austin as an assistant professor of psychology. He remained on the faculty of the University of Texas at Austin until 2005, when he joined the faculty of GSU. While at the University of Texas at Austin, he helped found the Institute for Neuroscience and the interdisciplinary neuroscience Ph.D. program there. At GSU, he became a professor of psychology upon joining their faculty in 2005. He has been the co-director of research and academic programs at GSU's Center for Behavioral Neuroscience since 2005, and had been the director of GSU's Neuroscience Institute since it was formed in 2008. In 2013, he received a five-year, $499,209 grant from the National Science Foundation to create the Sociogenomics Initiative Research Coordination Network, which unites researchers in the U.S. and Canada working in the field of sociogenomics.

== Research ==
Wilczynski's research focused on the study of neural origins of social behavior in animals. This research drew upon multiple separate disciplines, including neuroanatomy, neuroendocrinology, and neurophysiology. Animals whose behavior he studied include multiple frog species, such as cricket frogs, American green tree frogs, and túngara frogs.

== Awards and memberships ==
Wilczynski was a member of the American Association for the Advancement of Science and Sigma Xi, among other organizations. He was a Fulbright U.S. Scholar to the University of Chile in 2016.

== Editorial activities ==
Wilczynski was the editor-in-chief of Brain, Behavior and Evolution from 1999 to 2009. He was also an editorial board member of the Journal of Zoology (2007–2010) and an associate editor of Animal Behaviour (1997–2000).
