= San Bernardino, Novellara =

Italian village

San Bernardino
- Frazione
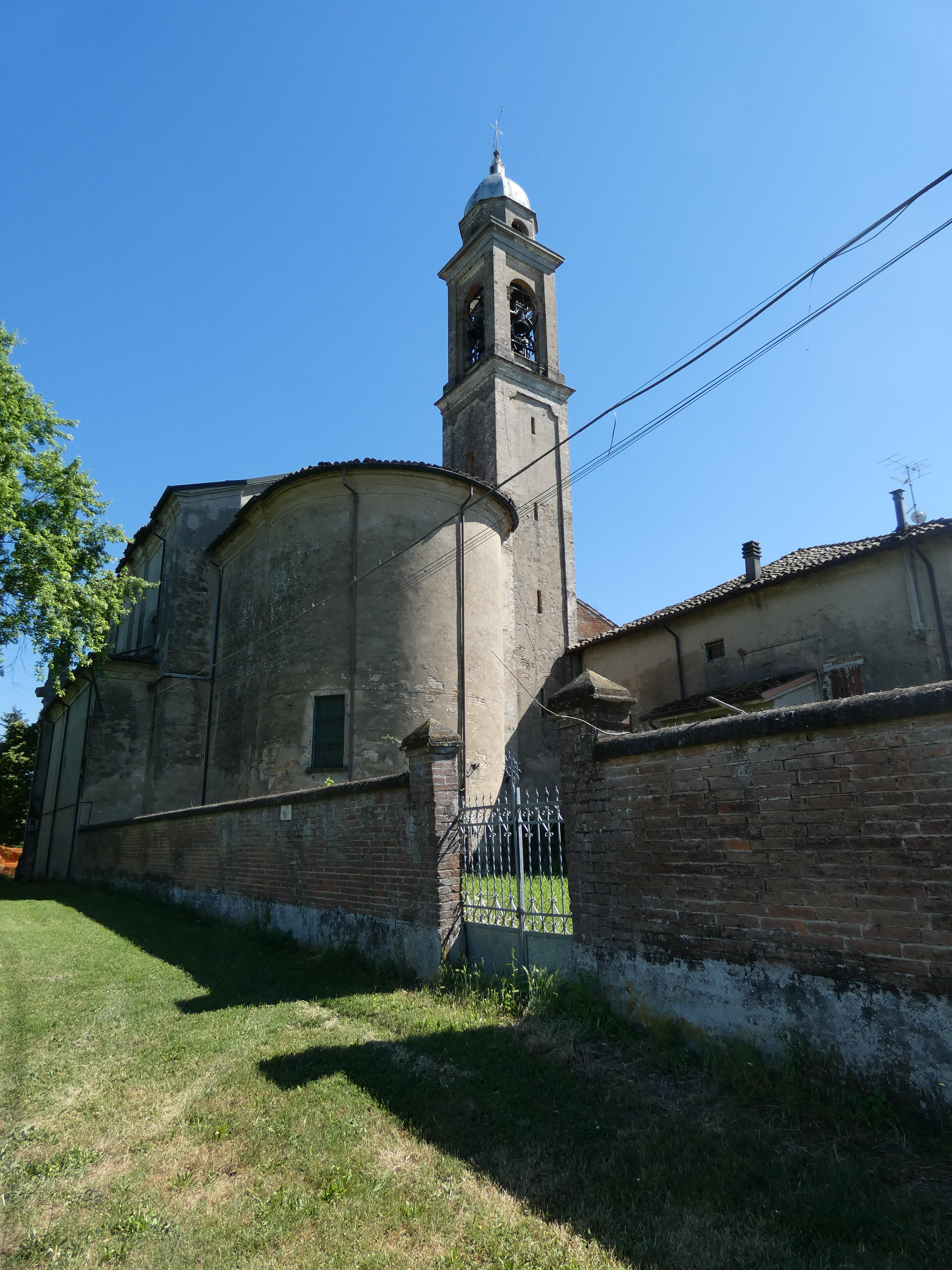

- Location within Italy
- Coordinates: 44°51′54.51″N 10°40′07.89″E
- Country: Italy
- Region: Emilia-Romagna
- Province: Reggio Emilia
- Commune: Novellara
- Elevation: 75 ft (23 m)

Population (2014)
  - Total: 326
- Time zone: UTC+1 (CET)
  - Summer (DST): UTC+2 (CEST)

San Bernardino (Reggiano: Sân Bernardèin) is a frazione of Novellara in the province of Reggio Emilia. It has a population of 326 inhabitants.

== Geography ==
In the middle of the Po Valley, San Bernardino is located 5 km (3.1 mi) from Novellara and 25 km (16 mi) from Reggio Emilia. It is surrounded by wheat fields.

== History ==
"Terreni Novi" (English: New Land), i.e. today's frazione of San Bernardino, was among the first belongings of the House of Gonzaga to be reclaimed between the 15th and 16th centuries. This was possible after the impoundment of the swamps occupying the area. At the end of the 15th century, Francesco I started the construction of two big houses, called "Costanze" in honour of his wife Costanza Strozzi. During the following century, the first church dedicated to Bernardino of Siena was erected at the behest of Alessandro I. Around 1580, a new house, Cascina Vittoria, was built, named after Vittoria di Capua, wife of Alfonso I Gonzaga. The Gonzaga family often visited San Bernardino to hunt pheasants, partridges and quails. One of the first written sources on "Terreni Novi" is about the production of cheese. Giulio Cesare Gonzaga, in 1529, hired Lorenzo and Antonio Busi, sons of the jew Giarono, and rented a farmhouse, with 140 cows and extended grasslands to produce Parmesan cheese. Furthermore some tools are mentioned, such as "cauldrons, skimmers, wooden moulds, and wooden boards for cheese".

=== Tenuta Riviera ===
The name comes from the Marquis Giangiacomo Riva, who obtained the area by purchasing it from the Gonzaga family in 1671. The latter used it as a hunting zone since the first reclamations of San Bernardino, which was regularly visited by noblewomen with falcons and falconers. Even after the reclamation works, most of the territory remained submerged anyway: indeed it has been employed in rice cultivation since the first years of the 15th century.

At the beginning of the 1800s, it was acquired by Count Venceslao Spalletti. Only afterward, in 1920, the area was drained. As a result of various works of agricultural restructure and renovation of the facilities, it has been converted into an estate, worthy of hosting reputable visitors, such as Albert Sabin, inventor of the polio vaccine, Alexander Fleming, discoverer of penicillin, and Benito Mussolini. Nowadays, due to the abandonment of the countryside, only some parts of the estate are used, solely for agritourism and catering services.

The estate consists of a manor house and an oratory dedicated to Aloysius Gonzaga, including also fourteen rural buildings, constructed between the 17th and the 18th centuries, and later converted into farmhouses in the 1930s: these were the first houses in the area to have running water. It is fully crossed by a long straight road, which connects the provincial road, Novellara-Guastalla, to the manor house through a gate. Behind the estate, there is a grove, which is what remains of the vast and dense forest of former times.

== Monuments and places of interest ==
=== Religious structures ===
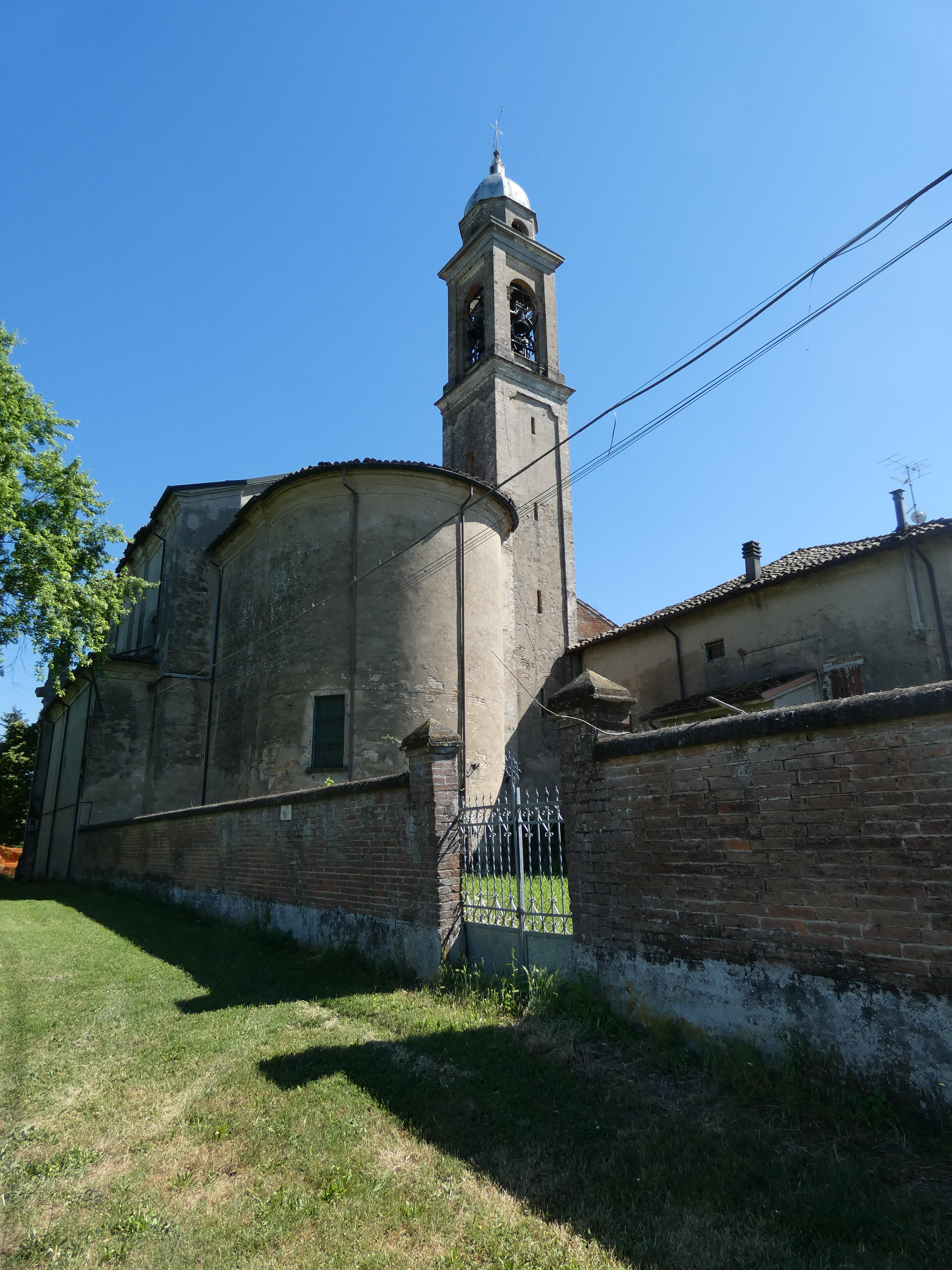
Bell tower of the Church of San Bernardino

- Church of San Bernardino, parish church originally built in 1644 and rebuilt in 1749.

== Culture ==
=== Events ===
- Festa della Pavera, a village festival devoted to gastronomy and music, with an exhibition of paintings by local artists and demonstrations of ancient games and crafts. The name of the festival comes from the rural tradition of harvesting sedge (Reggiano: pavera), a marsh grass used in the past to craft chairs, baskets and bags. The festival is held every year in Tenuta Riviera.
- Every year, during the Christmas season, there is an exhibition of nativity scenes, coming from all over the world. Originally this exhibition was usually held inside the Church of San Bernardino, but, given the internal damage caused by the earthquake, it has been moved to Tenuta Riviera. Over the years some artists have witnessed this public display, such as Orietta Berti, Giovanna Nocetti e Milva.

== See also ==
- Novellara
- Reggio Emilia
- Gonzaga
