= John Allman =

American neuroscientist

John Morgan Allman is an American neuroscientist at the California Institute of Technology in Pasadena, California, active in the fields of primates, cognition and evolutionary neuroscience.

== Education ==
He graduated from University of Chicago with a PhD in anthropology.

== Career ==
In 2000, Allman's laboratory reported identification of a class of neurons - large spindle-shaped cells - unique to humans and our closest relatives, the great apes. The spindle neurons, now called the Von Economo neurons to distinguish them from other spindle-shaped cells, were first located in layer V of the anterior cingulate cortex (ACC), and later found in the frontoinsular cortex.

Allman's team has reported reduced ACC size and metabolic activity in autistic patients, and activity of the ACC is also reduced in patients diagnosed with attention deficit disorder (ADD) and depression, whereas ACC activity is increased in patients with obsessive-compulsive, phobic, post-traumatic stress, and anxiety disorders. The ACC is largely responsible for relaying waves of neural signals from deep within the brain to far flung regions, including Brodmann area 10.

Spindle neurons may develop abnormally in people with autistic disorders, and abnormalities may also be linked to schizophrenia and frontotemporal lobe degeneration, but research into these correlations is at a very early stage.

Allman studies brain evolution in mammals from multiple perspectives, and has created a number of 3d reconstructions of mammalian brains.

== Grants ==
- 2009 James S. McDonnell Foundation

== Works ==
- John Allman, Atiya Hakeem, J.M. Erwin, E. Nimchinsky, P. Hof (2001). 'Anterior cingulate cortex: The evolution of an interface between emotion and cognition', Annals of the New York Academy of Sciences, Vol 935, pp 107–117.
- John Allman, Atiya Hakeem, and Karli Watson (2002). 'Two phylogenetic specializations in the human brain', The Neuroscientist, Vol 8, No 4 pp 335–346.
- Eliot C. Bush, John M. Allman (2004). 'Three-dimensional structure and evolution of primate primary visual cortex', Anatomical Record, No 281A, pp 1088–1094.
- John Allman (2007). 'Moral intuition: Its neural substrates and normative significance', J Physiol Paris, 101 (4-6), pp 179–202.
- John Allman (1999). Evolving Brains (132MB). New York: Scientific American Library. ISBN 978-0-7167-5076-5

== See also ==
- Evolutionary neuroscience
- Nervous system
- Karl Pribram
