= University of Lethbridge =

University in Alberta, Canada

- Blackfoot: Iniskim, Sacred Buffalo Stone
- Motto: Latin: Fiat Lux
- Motto in English: Let there be light
- Type: Public
- Established: 1967; 59 years ago
- Academic affiliations: Universities Canada, ACU
- Endowment: $104.5 million (2024)
- Chancellor: Terry Whitehead
- President: Digvir Jayas
- Provost: Michelle Helstein
- Faculty: 600
- Students: 7,434 (2023-24 fulltime equivalent)
- Undergraduates: 7,528
- Postgraduates: 735
- Location: 4401 University Drive; Lethbridge, Alberta; T1K 3M4; 49.6782°N 112.8640°W
- Campus: Urban 185 ha (1,850,000 m^{2})
- Colours: Blue and Yellow
- Nickname: Pronghorns
- Sporting affiliations: U Sports, CWUAA,
- Mascot: Luxie
- Website: www.ulethbridge.ca

The University of Lethbridge (also known as uLethbridge, uLeth, and U of L) is a public comprehensive and research university located in Lethbridge, Alberta, Canada, with a second campus in Calgary, Alberta, and until 2015 a third campus in Edmonton, Alberta.

Founded in the liberal arts tradition, the university offers over 150 undergraduate degree programs in the Arts, Sciences, Management, Education, Health Sciences and Fine Arts. Further, the university has over 50 Masters and PhD programs.

Ranked as one of the top primarily undergraduate universities in Canada by Maclean's magazine, the university has a provincial economic impact of $2.7 billion. It is the second largest employer in the city of Lethbridge, with over 2,000 employees, including 600 academic staff. The student population consists of 7,528 undergraduates and 735 graduate students as of 2022. There are over 55,000 alumni around the world.

== History ==
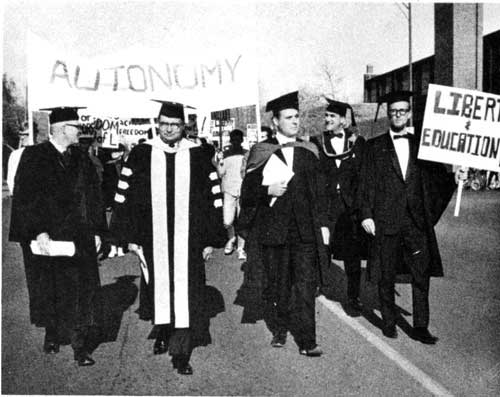
March in support of the university being located in west Lethbridge

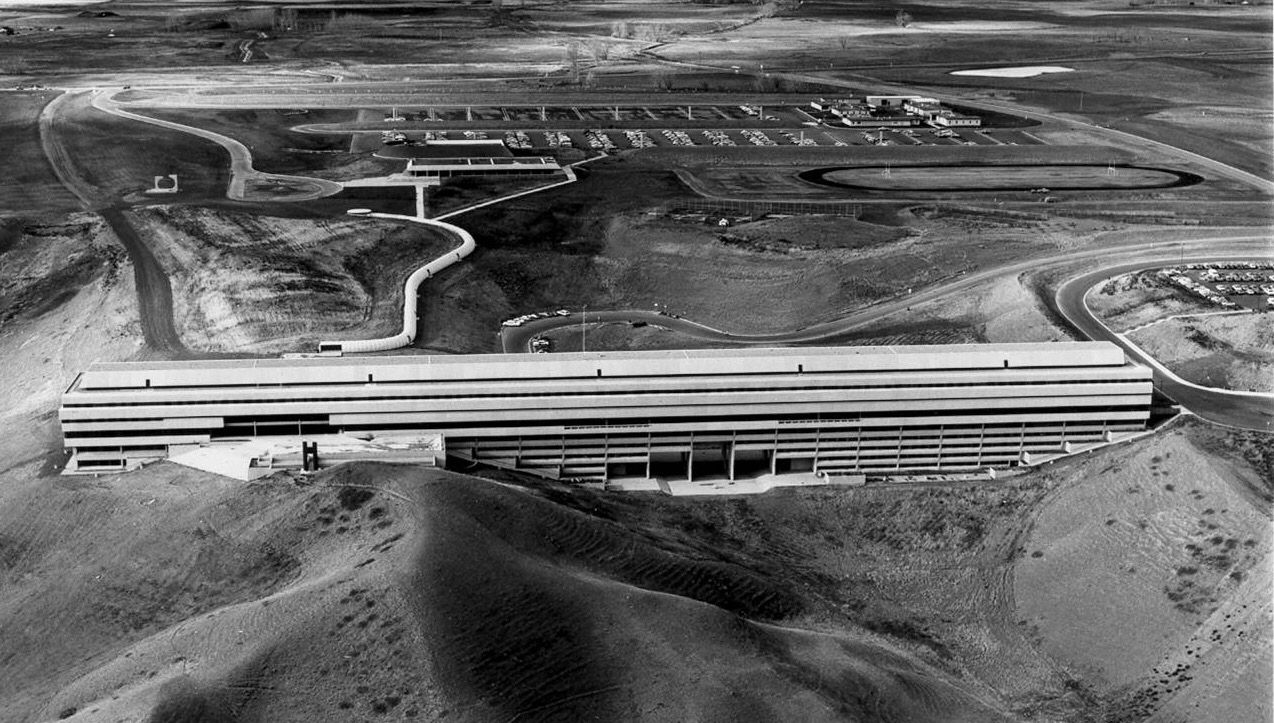
University of Lethbridge, circa 1972

Established by a provincial Order in Council as Alberta's third university during a period of rapid population growth in the province. The University of Lethbridge welcomed 650 students when it first opened its doors in 1967 on the Lethbridge Junior College campus. With the completion of University Hall in 1971, the university moved permanently to west Lethbridge with enrolment growing to over 1,200 students. The current location of the university was chosen only after an intense community debate with the provincial government which wanted the university to be located in east Lethbridge. After the university's first convocation on May 18, 1968, more than 500 students, faculty and community members held a protest march in support of having the university located in west Lethbridge. Soon after, the government decided west Lethbridge would be the university's permanent location.

In January 1984, on a Monday morning, a Volkswagen Beetle car was spotted on top of University Hall. This led to a 33-year mystery.

University Hall was designed by the renowned architect Arthur Erickson and sits within the coulees above the Oldman River. University Hall was selected as one of four buildings to appear on a Canadian postage stamp celebrating the 100th anniversary of the Royal Architectural Institute of Canada (RAIC).

On February 10, 2022, the University of Lethbridge Faculty Association began its first ever legal strike action over issues such as working conditions, collegial governance, and equitable pay and benefits. The strike concluded on March 23, with the Faculty Association voting 91% in favour of a new collective agreement with the university lasting through June 2024.

== Academics ==
The University of Lethbridge offers both undergraduate and graduate degrees in four faculties and three schools, as described below.

The university is accredited under Alberta's Post-Secondary Learning Act and is considered a "comprehensive academic and research university" (CARU), which means offer a range of academic and professional programs that generally lead to undergraduate and graduate level credentials, and have a strong research focus.

=== Faculties and Schools ===
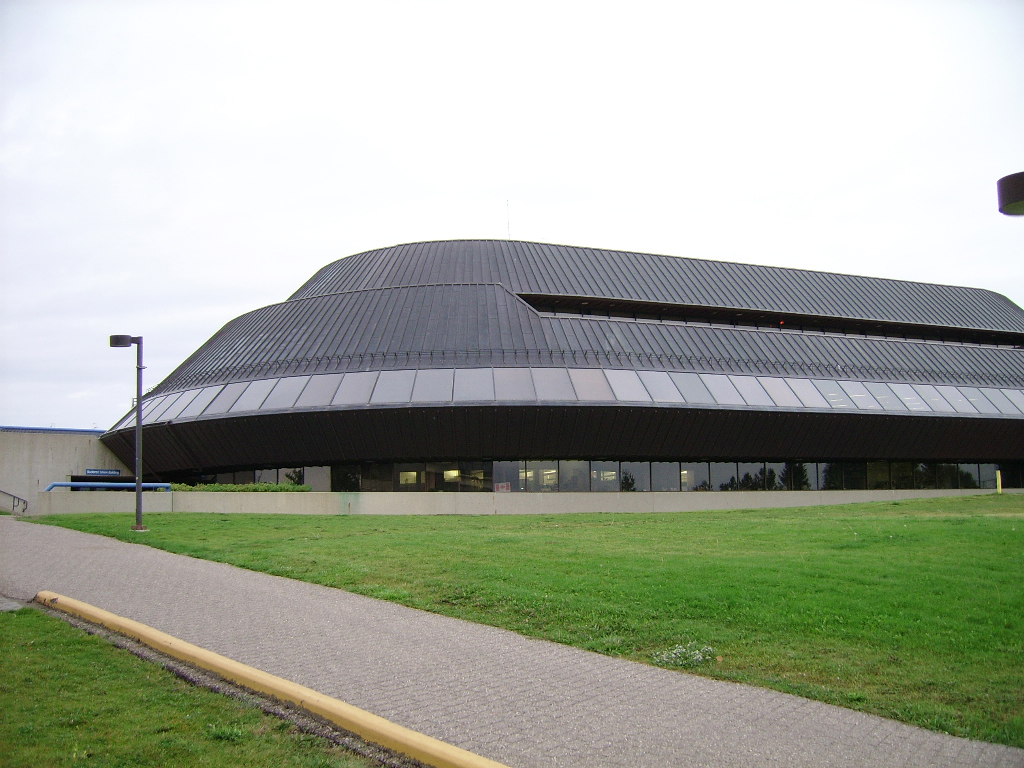
Students' Union building at University of Lethbridge

The University of Lethbridge offers over 150 degree programs. It has seven faculties and schools that administer its bachelor's, master's, and doctoral degrees.

- Faculty of Arts and Science
- Faculty of Education
- Faculty of Fine Arts
- Faculty of Health Sciences
- Dhillon School of Business
- School of Graduate Studies
- School of Liberal Education

The Faculty of Arts and Science offers nine pre-professional programs in dentistry, journalism, law, medicine, nutrition and food sciences, optometry, social work, and veterinary medicine, as well as an engineering transfer program, through which students take their first year at the University of Lethbridge before completing their degrees at the University of Alberta or the University of Saskatchewan.

The Agility program in Innovation and Entrepreneurship was launched at the university in 2015. This program encourages transdisciplinary innovation, including social innovation, and will soon include a large makerspace in the new science and academic building to complement existing, specialized makerspaces. The university also partners with the Tecconnect centre for entrepreneurship and innovation (Economic Development Lethbridge), Regional Innovation Network of Southern Alberta (RINSA), and other organizations to encourage the production of spinoffs and collaboration with industry.

=== Indigenous Student Programs ===
The University of Lethbridge provides special first-year bridging programs for Indigenous students. The University of Lethbridge's Niitsitapi Teacher Education Program with Red Crow Community College was developed in partnership with specific Indigenous communities to meet specific needs within Aboriginal communities.

=== Southern Alberta Medical Program ===
In 2024, the University of Lethbridge and the University of Calgary signed a MOU to establish a new Rural Medical Education Training Program in Lethbridge to help increase the number of physicians practising in Southern Alberta. The program will be located on the University of Lethbridge's main campus in the former building of the Canadian Centre for Behavioural Neuroscience and once operational will enrol up to 30 students per year in the Cumming School of Medicine's accelerated 3-year undergraduate medical education curriculum. The first cohort started classes July 2026.

== Research ==
The University of Lethbridge is a research-intensive university, named "Research University of the Year" in the undergraduate category in 2012, and consistently ranks highly in terms of TriCouncil funding, especially in the sciences, but increasingly in all fields of scholarly inquiry. It is home to 60 research chairs, 8 Fellows of the Royal Society of Canada, and 2 Order of Canada recipients.

The university is home to 15 centres and institutes, which transcend traditional disciplinary boundaries, including the Alberta Gambling Research Institute (AGRI), Alberta RNA Research and Training Institute (ARRTI), Alberta Terrestrial Imaging Centre (ATIC), Canadian Centre for Behavioural Neuroscience (CCBN), Canadian Centre for Research in Advanced Fluorine Technologies (C-CRAFT), Centre for the Study of Scholarly Communication (CSSC), Centre for Culture and Community (CCC), Centre for Oral History and Tradition (COHT), Centre for Socially Responsible Marketing (CSRM), Health Services Quality Institute (HSQI), Institute for Child and Youth Studies (I-CYS), Institute for Space Imaging Science (ISIS), Prentice Institute for Global Population and Economy, Small Business Institute (SBI), and Water Institute for Sustainable Environments (WISE).

The university's infrastructure in the sciences and information technology is accessible to undergraduate students and the university is a provincial leader in terms of undergraduate involvement in publishable and translational faculty research and innovation.

== Rankings ==
University rankings

World rankings
- THE World: 1201–1500
- USNWR World: 1741

Canadian rankings
- THE National: 31
- USNWR National: 37
- Maclean's Undergraduate: 6
- Maclean's Reputation: 37

The University of Lethbridge was ranked 6th in Canada in the primarily undergraduate university category for Maclean's 2024 university rankings.

== Campus ==
=== Library ===
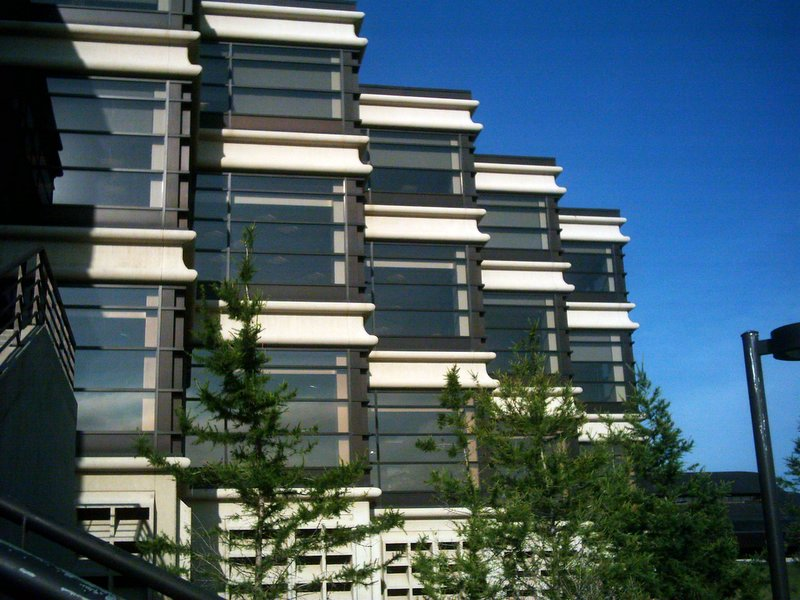
Library

The LINC (Library Information Network Centre) was opened in 2001 after a 10-year fundraising campaign. It houses the library, numerous individual and group study spaces, and some of the best views on campus.

=== Community Centre for Wellness (CCW) ===
Formerly home to the Canadian Centre for Behavioural Neuroscience (CCBN), the Community Centre for Wellness building is the planned future home of the Southern Alberta Medical Program (SAMP), and is currently undergoing renovations. It is set to re-open in July 2027.

=== Co-Op Centre for Sport & Wellness ===
The Co-Op Centre (formerly 1st Choice Savings Centre) includes the following facilities:

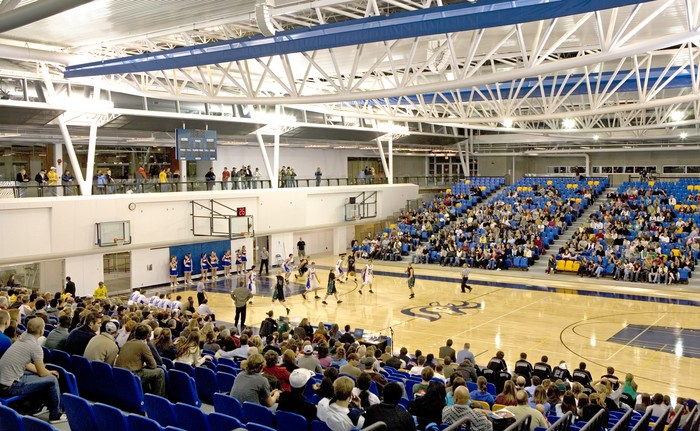
Co-Op Centre

- A triple gymnasium (2 hardwood floors and 1 synthetic surface), with retractable seating for 2000 spectators; suitable for hosting major sporting events as well as conferences and speaking engagements;
- A 2,000 square foot main climbing wall;
- A new expanded fitness centre along with a four-lane 200 metre indoor running track;
- Multi-purpose studios for yoga, dance and fitness classes allow for more fitness programming for all ages; and,
- Universal change rooms and expanded locker rooms with steam room.

=== Turcotte Hall ===
Opened in 2008, Turcotte Hall is home to the Faculty of Education, Counselling Services and the campus Physical Plant. It was named after Louis S. Turcotte, a local lawyer and the first chancellor of the University, from 1968-1972.

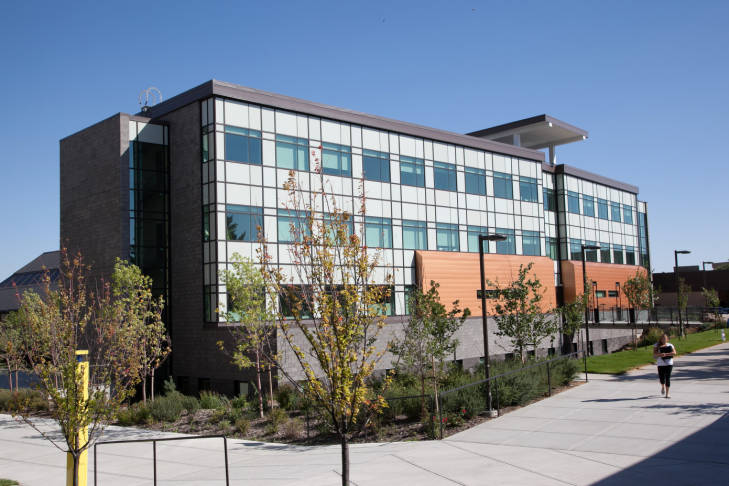
Turcotte Hall - Faculty of Education.

=== Alberta Water and Environment Science Building ===
The Alberta Water and Environment Science Building (AWESB) was completed in 2008 and contains numerous sustainable features that helped it earn silver LEED certification. The AWESB houses many of the country's most accomplished water researchers and is home to the Water Institute for Sustainable Environments.

=== Community Sports Stadium ===
The $12-million facility was constructed through a partnership between the City of Lethbridge and the University of Lethbridge, with additional funding provided by the Government of Alberta. The Stadium includes:

- One artificial grass, regulation size combination soccer/rugby/football field with lights;
- One natural grass, regulation size soccer pitch;
- A 400-metre, eight lane synthetic outdoor track; and,
- Throwing areas, jumping pits and open spaces for various track and field events; grandstand stadium seating for 2000 spectator.

=== Markin Hall ===
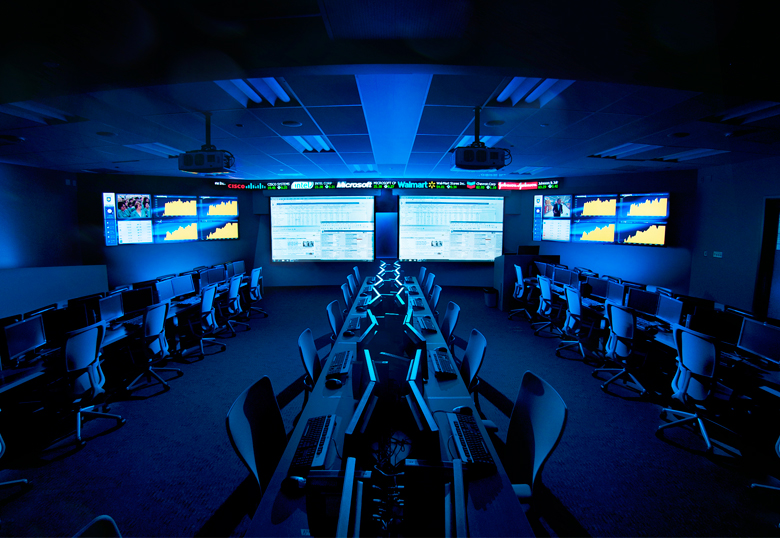
Trading room

Opened in 2011 and named after Dr. Alan Markin in recognition of his generous financial support of the building, Markin Hall is home to the Dhillon School of Business and the Faculty of Health Sciences. The building includes the Centre for Financial Market Research and Teaching (“Trading Room”) which provides direct connections to global trading markets, giving students hands-on experience with equities trading and risk management. Also has the Simulation Health Centre, which has patient simulators for the Health Sciences students. Students can engage in clinical practice on life like mannequins which can simulate body functions in a realistic setting set up to imitate a hospital.

=== Science Commons ===
The most recent development at the University of Lethbridge is the "Destination Project", the first phase of which was a new $280M 38,500 square metres (414,000 sq ft) science and academic building, known as Science Commons. This facility, officially opened in September 2019, features laboratory and teaching facilities, as well as "outreach" and "maker" spaces. The Science Commons houses over 100 faculty researchers in physics, astronomy, chemistry, biochemistry, biological sciences, neuroscience, and psychology. In 2018, it was shortlisted for the World Architecture Festival Located in Science Commons, the Canadian Centre for Behavioural Neuroscience (CCBN) is home to Canada's first Department of Neuroscience, state-of-the-art labs, and has attracted world-class researchers, including: Dr. Bryan Kolb and Dr. Bruce McNaughton.

== Student life ==
The student body of the University of Lethbridge is represented by two students' unions, the University of Lethbridge Students' Union for all undergraduate students, and the Graduate Student Association for all graduate students. There are over 70 student clubs that provide social and athletic activities, travel, religious fellowship, and charitable and cultural support. The undergraduate student union, as well as many of the student organizations and clubs, are centred in the university's student activity centre, the Students' Union Building. The building was opened in 1990, and hosts the majority of the Students' Union services and business operations.

The two primary media outlets amongst the student population are the student newspaper, The Meliorist, which has been in print since 1967 and the campus radio station, CKXU 88.3 FM, which first went to air in 1978.

=== Athletics ===
The university is represented in U Sports by the Lethbridge Pronghorns, formerly known as the Chinooks. They have men's and women's teams in basketball, judo, rugby union (women only), soccer, swimming, and track and field. The university formerly had men's and women's teams in volleyball (the men's team was cut in 1988, followed by the women in the early 1990s) and ice hockey (the men's and women's teams were simultaneously cut in April 2020), the latter of whom played off-campus at the Nicholas Sheran Ice Centre owned by the City of Lethbridge. The Pronghorns have won national championships in men's hockey (1994) and women's rugby (2007, 2008, 2009). The university has an intramurals program.

The home gymnasium for the Pronghorns is the 1st Choice Savings Centre for Sport & Wellness which includes three full-size basketball courts, an indoor track field, a rock-climbing wall, and an exercise room. The construction was finished in 2006 and is open to the public on a membership basis.

An outdoor stadium in the southern campus opened in fall 2009. It is the home of the Pronghorns soccer teams and the women's rugby team.

== The University of Lethbridge Art Gallery ==
The University of Lethbridge Art Gallery is a public campus gallery with one of the largest art collections in Canada. Art gallery programming focuses on research-based and public engaged exhibitions and activities.

The University of Lethbridge art collection includes over 15,000 objects. The collection includes works by international and Canadian artists, including significant numbers of works from First Nations and Inuit artists. Exhibitions and programming that includes collection works emphasizes connecting contemporary artists and community with this expansive resource. In 2018, the estate of Dr. Margaret (Marmie) Hess donated over 1000 artworks to the University of Lethbridge Art Gallery art collection. Valued at over 4 million dollars, the donation included works by Tom Thomson, members of the Group of Seven, Emily Carr, over 400 Indigenous artists such as Alex Janvier and Kenojuak Ashevak, and prints from artists like Pablo Picasso and Marc Chagall.

Programming priorities include supporting Mootookakio'ssin (meaning distant awareness in Blackfoot), a Blackfoot elder and student-led initiative that supports the digitization of Blackfoot objects held in museum collections across Britain to support virtual access to Blackfoot art and history. Under the guidance of elders from Kainai, Piikani, Siksika and Amskapipiikani Blackfoot communities, this project has resulted in a digital library home to 3D scans of objects housed in distant museum collections and programming that further access to Blackfoot traditional knowledge.

In addition to art exhibitions, the University of Lethbridge Art Gallery programming emphasizes community engagement opportunities and generates research on community engagement as a result.

== Lineage and establishment ==
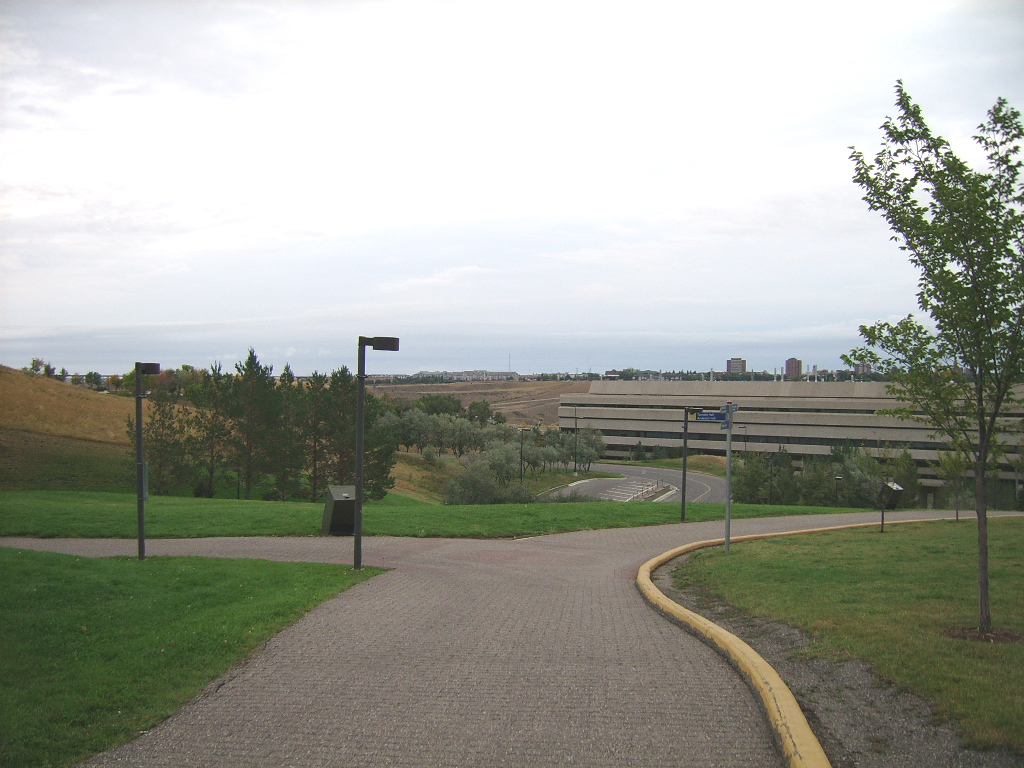
East-facing view of University Hall taken prior to the construction of the Science Commons building

Chancellors
Chancellor	Term start	Term end
Louis S. Turcotte	1968	1972
James Oshiro	1972	1975
Van E. Christou	1975	1979
Islay M. Arnold	1979	1983
William S. Russell	1983	1987
Keith V. Robin	1987	1991
Ingrid M. Speaker	1991	1995
Robert Hironaka	1995	1999
Jim Horsman	1999	2003
Shirley DeBow	2003	2007
Richard Davidson	2007	2011
Shirley McClellan	2011	2015
Janice Varzari	2015	2019
Charles Weaselhead	2019	2023
Terry Whitehead	2023	

Presidents
President	Term start	Term end
Russell J. Leskiw (acting)	1967	1967
Sam Smith	1967	1972
William E. Beckel	1972	1979
John H. Woods	1979	1986
Gerald S. Kenyon (acting)	1986	1987
Howard E. Tennant	1987	2000
William H. Cade	2000	2010
Michael J. Mahon	2010	2023
Digvir Jayas	2023	

== Notable people ==
- Jim Antoine, politician
- Kacie Bosch, athlete
- Scott Cyr, politician
- Winston Day Chief, athlete
- Alvin Fiddler, politician
- Leslie Greentree, author, poet
- Apollo Hess, athlete
- Jim Hillyer, politician
- Nate Horner, politician
- Andrew N. Iwaniuk, neuroscientist
- Taylor Kitsch, actor
- Leroy Little Bear, Indigenous scholar
- Austin Mardon, academic
- Cheryl Misak, academic, administrator
- Rob Miyashiro, politician
- Robert J. H. Morrison, academic, author
- Indira Naidoo-Harris, broadcaster, politician
- Karen Schwartzkopf-Genswein, scientist
- Ashley Steacy, athlete
- Heather Steacy, athlete
- Jim Steacy, athlete
- Esther Tailfeathers, physician
- Darcy Tamayose, local author
- Theo Tams, musician
- Rachael Thomas, politician
- Alfred Waugh, architect
- Jarret Zukiwsky, athlete

== See also ==
- University of Lethbridge Students' Union
- CKXU-FM
- Lethbridge Pronghorns
