= Alfred Waugh =

Canadian architect

- Born: Yellowknife, Northwest Territories, Canada
- Education: University of British Columbia University of Lethbridge
- Occupation: Architect
- Awards: Governor General's Medal for Architecture, Royal Architectural Institute of Canada, Canada Council for the Arts
- Practice: Formline Architecture + Urbanism
- Buildings: Nicola Valley Institute of Technology

Alfred V. Waugh is an Indigenous architect based in British Columbia. Born in Yellowknife, Waugh studied Urban and Regional Studies as an undergraduate at the University of Lethbridge, and pursued a second bachelors degree in architecture at the University of British Columbia School of Architecture. Waugh founded Formline Architecture + Urbanism in 2005, an Indigenous-owned practice. He is best known for the design of the Indian Residential School History, and Dialogue Centre at the University of British Columbia, designed alongside Manny Trinca and Vince Knudsen. Another notable project is the First Peoples House at the University of Victoria, which he designed in collaboration with Kenneth Wong.

== Early life and education ==
Waugh was born in Yellowknife, Northwest Territories in Canada, to a mother who was of First Nations descent. He is a Status Indian and part of Treaty 8 and his First Nation community is Fond du Lac located in Northern Saskatchewan.

In 1989, Waugh completed his bachelors degree in Urban and Regional Studies at the University of Lethbridge. he went on to pursue a degree in architecture from the University of British Columbia School of Architecture, where he was the first Indigenous person to graduate with honours in 1993.

== Career ==
Waugh started his career working at Larry McFarland's office while he was a student. After graduating, he worked as a design architect at Busby Perkins + Will from 1996 to 2001, and then moved on to be a partner of Waugh Busby Architects from 2001 to 2004. In 2005, Waugh established Alfred Waugh Architects, a 100% Indigenous owned architecture practice. The firm was incorporated in 2012, and Waugh changed the name to Formline Architecture, where he is the President and Founding Principal.

== Philosophy ==
The strength of Waugh's designs is derived from consulting with Indigenous communities and translating their wisdom into sustainable design that is respectful of the site and the culture of the community. In his designs, Waugh incorporates landscape-oriented modernism and emphasizes cultural sensitivity and ecological sustainability.

== Work ==
=== Projects ===
Waugh has completed the following projects and designs:

- Indian Residential School History and Dialogue Centre (2018) University of British Columbia, Vancouver, British Columbia
- Nicola Valley Institute of Technology, Merritt, British Columbia
- First Peoples House (2010) University of Victoria, British Columbia
- Squamish Lil'wat Cultural Centre (2008) Whistler, British Columbia
- Liard River Hotsprings Replacement Project (2012) Liard River Hot Spring Provincial Park, British Columbia, a replacement of the previous change rooms
- Cowichan Tribes Administration building (2017) Duncan, British Columbia, an addition and renovation of the tribes administration building
- Capilano University (2012) North Vancouver, British Columbia
- O'syiam Pavilion (2011) Squamish, British Columbia
- Dzee Ba' Yugh Heart House (2019) Lake Babine Nation, Burns Lake, British Columbia
- Chemainus First Nations Preschool (2010) Ladysmith, British Columbia
- Squaxin Island Natural and Cultural Resource Centre (2014) Shelton, Washington
- Shq'apthut: The Gathering Place, Vancouver Island University (phase 1 completed in 2010) Nanaimo, British Columbia
- North Island College Aboriginal Gathering Place (2021) North Island College, Campbell River, British Columbia
- Mainville Residence (2013) Errington, British Columbia
- BCIT Aboriginal Gathering Place (2011) Burnaby, British Columbia
- Livingston Residence (2014) Esquimalt, British Columbia
- Saskatoon Public Library (ongoing) Saskatoon
- University of Toronto Scarborough Indigenous House (design completed in 2012) University of Toronto Scarborough, Ontario
- Mi'kmawey Debert Cultural Centre (design completed in 2021) Debert, Nova Scotia
- Barkerville Indigenous Cultural Centre (design completed in 2019) Barkerville, British Columbia
- Madawaska Maliseet First Nation Viewing Tower (design completed in 2021) Edmunston, New Brunswick
- International Centre for Sustainable Rural Communities (design completed in 2018) Brockville, Ontario
- Pauquachin Big House (design complete in 2017) North Saanich, Vancouver Island, British Columbia
- Ts'ewulhtun Health Centre Renovation and Expansion (design completed in 2011) Duncan, British Columbia
- Cowichan Tribes Multi-Family Housing Project Proto-Type (design Completed in 2014) Duncan, British Columbia

=== Awards ===
In 2022, Waugh, and his firm Formline Architecture was awarded The Governor General's Medals in Architecture from The Royal Architectural Institute of Canada (RAIC) and the Canada Council for the Arts (CCA), the first Indigenous-owned architectural firm to be awarded the Governor General's Medal for Architecture.

- Western Red Cedar Association Architectural Design Award, First Peoples House, University of Victoria, Victoria, British Columbia, 2010;
- Canadian Wood Council Award, Use of the Red Cedar, Liard River Hotsprings Replacement Project, Liard River, British Columbia, 2014;
- BC Wood Design Awards, Institutional Wood Design, Small, UBC Indian Residential School History and Dialogue Centre, UBC Vancouver, British Columbia, 2019;
- Governor General's Medal for Architecture Governor General's Medal for Architecture, UBC Indian Residential School History and Dialogue Centre, UBC Vancouver, British Columbia, 2022;
