= The Meliorist =

The Meliorist Publishing Society
- Formation: September 1967
- Headquarters: SU166- SU Building University of Lethbridge
- President: Jocelyn McKnight
- Treasurer: Kaiden Nott
- Secretary: Amelia Townsend
- Past President: Gage Destuer
- Board of directors: Board of Directors of the Meliorist Publishing Society
- Key people: Business Manager- Blaine Badiuk, Editor-in-Chief- Kianna Turner
- Publication: The Meliorist (1967-Present)
- Website: themeliorist.ca

The Meliorist is the Student Newspaper at the University of Lethbridge published by the student ran Meliorist Publishing Society. Established in September 1967, The Meliorist is the oldest student organization at the university as the ULSU was not established until October 1967. The paper has shifted through various formed as the medium of printing changed, going from a traditional styled newspaper to a magazine style and is now working to shift to a more digital presence.

== History ==
The Meliorist was founded in September 1967 at the University of Lethbridge, which at the time was based at the Lethbridge Polytechnic campus. The first edition came out on September 28, 1967, highlighting the creation of the University and the creation of Student representative bodies. The first Editor-in-Chief was Gregory Hales and the First Business Manager was Arthur Joevenazzo, with a total team of 12 people.

In October 1970, during the October Crisis the Meliorist published the Front de libération du Québec's manifesto, which was at the time against the law. The edition carrying the manifesto was then collected by staff after publication and stored in the office. Then Editor-in-Chief Barry Poffenroth resigned his post upon being threatened with expulsion if he was arrested. Staff then voted to Allen Wilson as the new Editor-in-Chief and redistribute the paper. Lethbridge Police then alerted University Administration that they were coming on campus to arrest Wilson and confiscate all copies of the Meliorist. University Administration and the University of Lethbridge Students' Union were able to broker a deal to keep Wilson out of jail, under the strict condition of not reprinting the manifesto. In January 1971 students voted to dismiss the staff of the Meliorist, but as the Students Council was unable to find new individuals willing to run the Meliorist.

In 1973, the Meliorist played a role in controversies over the Lethbridge Birth Control Information Center (LBCIC). The Meliorist was one of the principal positive proponents of the LBCIC's operations, and actively supported its operations at a time when the Lethbridge Herald took a more reserved approach to the Centers operations.

In March 1977, the Meliorist had a referendum to establish a 3.50 dollar a semester fee, which would gain the Meliorist an estimated 13,800 a year. The Student Council voted in October 1978 to withhold this funding in full and instead only grant 7,600 a year. This brought on some concerns at the time about whether the ULSU had the power to unilaterally reduce the fee revenue for the Meliorist. Conflict over the tense relationship between the ULSU and Meliorist resulted in the Canadian University Press establishing a committee, with representatives of the Federation of Alberta Students, the Gauntlet (University of Calgary Student newspaper), and Lethbridge Herald, to look into the situation. It was the ultimate recommendation of this commission for an independent board of directors to be established, which would then be responsible for the publication of the paper.

In 1980 the students voted in a separate referendum to make the Meliorist Publishing Society independent of the Students Union, with the levy fee being directly collected by the University instead of by the Students Union. Under this agreement the Meliorist is the sole Levy Group at the University of Lethbridge that operates fully independent of the ULSU.

In October 2025, the Meliorist released its first Strategic Plan. This had a focus on improving the operations of the Meliorist in future and taking action to adapt

== Notable Alumni ==
- Terry Whitehead: Former Sports Editor for the Meliorist in the late 1980s. He went onto become President of the University of Lethbridge Students' Union for the 1990/91 term, and later became Chancellor of the University of Lethbridge serving from 2023 to present.
