= Vittorio Marchi =

Italian histologist

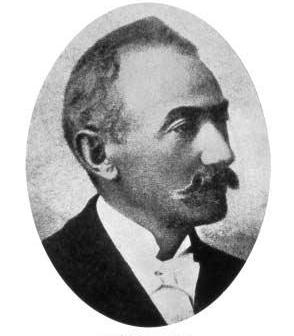
Vittorio Marchi (1851-1908)

Vittorio Marchi (30 May 1851 – 12 May 1908) was an Italian neurologist and histologist.

He was born in Novellara, in the northern Italian province of Reggio Emilia. He studied pharmaceutical chemistry and medicine at the University of Modena, earning his doctorate in 1882. He was head of the histology laboratory at the psychiatric hospital of Reggio Emilia, and later director of the primary medical hospital in Iesi, in the central Italian region of Marche. He died in Iesi at the age of 56.

He was the creator of a popular osmium-based staining method ("Marchi stain") for the demonstration of degenerating nerve fibers. In the late 1890s, he was a pioneer of meningioma surgery.

== Additional eponyms ==
- Marchi fixative: A substance used to demonstrate degenerating myelin.
- Marchi reaction: The failure of a nerve's myelin sheath to blacken when submitted to the processes of osmic acid.
- Marchi tract: Synonym for the tectospinal tract.

== Selected writings ==
- Nota preventiva sulla fina anatomia dei corpi striati. Communicata all'Academia di Medicina di Torino, 1883 - Nota preventiva on fine anatomy of the corpus striatum. Communication of the Academy of Medicine of Turin.
- Sulle degenerazioni discendenti consecutive a lesioni sperimentali in diverse zone della corteccia cerebrale. (with Giovanni Algeri), 1888 - On degenerative descending consecutive lesions of the cerebral cortex.
- Sull' origine e decorso dei peduncoli cerebellari e sui loro rapporti cogli altri centri nervosi, 1891 - The origin and paths of cerebellar peduncles and their relationships with other nerve centers.
