= Glenn Northcutt =

American neuroscientist (born 1941)

- Born: 1941 (age 84–85)
- Education: Millikin University, University of Illinois
- Known for: Work on comparative vertebrate neurobiology
- Awards: Guggenheim Fellowship for Natural Sciences (1978)
- Scientific career
- Fields: Neuroscience, ethology, neurobiology
- Workplaces: UC San Diego School of Medicine
- Thesis: The Telencephalon of the western painted turtle (Chrysemys picta belli) (1968)
- Notable students: Walter Wilczynski, Georg F. Striedter

Richard Glenn Northcutt (born 1941) is an American neuroscientist known for his work in comparative vertebrate neurobiology and evolutionary neuroscience. He serves on the editorial boards of the Journal of Comparative Neurology, Journal of Morphology, Visual Neuroscience, and Zoologische Reike, and was editor in chief of Brain, Behavior and Evolution.
