= Evolutionary neuroscience =

Study of the evolution of nervous systems

Evolutionary neuroscience is the scientific study of the evolution of nervous systems. Evolutionary neuroscientists investigate the evolution and natural history of nervous system structure, functions and emergent properties. The field draws on concepts and findings from both neuroscience and evolutionary biology. Historically, most empirical work has been in the area of comparative neuroanatomy, and modern studies often make use of phylogenetic comparative methods. Selective breeding and experimental evolution approaches are also being used more frequently.

Conceptually and theoretically, the field is related to fields as diverse as cognitive genomics, neurogenetics, developmental neuroscience, neuroethology, comparative psychology, evo-devo, behavioral neuroscience, cognitive neuroscience, behavioral ecology, biological anthropology and sociobiology.

Evolutionary neuroscientists examine changes in genes, anatomy, physiology, and behavior to study the evolution of changes in the brain. They study a multitude of processes including the evolution of vocal, visual, auditory, taste, and learning systems as well as language evolution and development. In addition, evolutionary neuroscientists study the evolution of specific areas or structures in the brain such as the amygdala, forebrain and cerebellum as well as the motor or visual cortex.

== History ==
Studies of the brain began during ancient Egyptian times but studies in the field of evolutionary neuroscience began after the publication of Darwin's On the Origin of Species in 1859. At that time, brain evolution was largely viewed at the time in relation to the incorrect scala naturae. Phylogeny and the evolution of the brain were still viewed as linear. During the early 20th century, there were several prevailing theories about evolution. Darwinism was based on the principles of natural selection and variation, Lamarckism was based on the passing down of acquired traits, Orthogenesis was based on the assumption that tendency towards perfection steers evolution, and Saltationism argued that discontinuous variation creates new species. Darwin's became the most accepted and allowed for people to starting thinking about the way animals and their brains evolve.

The 1936 book The Comparative Anatomy of the Nervous System of Vertebrates Including Man by the Dutch neurologist C.U. Ariëns Kappers (first published in German in 1921) was a landmark publication in the field. Following the Evolutionary Synthesis, the study of comparative neuroanatomy was conducted with an evolutionary view, and modern studies incorporate developmental genetics. It is now accepted that phylogenetic changes occur independently between species over time and can not be linear. It is also believed that an increase with brain size correlates with an increase in neural centers and behavior complexity.

=== Major arguments ===
Over time, there are several arguments that would come to define the history of evolutionary neuroscience. The first is the argument between E.G. St. Hilaire and G. Cuvier over the topic of "common plan versus diversity". St. Hilaire argued that all animals are built based on a single plan or archetype and he stressed the importance of homologies between organisms, while Cuvier believed that the structure of organs was determined by their function and that knowledge of the function of one organ could help discover the functions of other organs. He argued that there were at least four different archetypes. After Darwin, the idea of evolution was more accepted and St. Hilaire's idea of homologous structures was more accepted. The second major argument is that of Aristotle's scala naturae (scale of nature) and the great chain of being versus the phylogenetic bush. The scala naturae, later also called the phylogenetic scale, was based on the premise that phylogenies are linear or like a scale while the phylogenetic bush argument was based on the idea that phylogenies were not linear, and more resembled a bush – the currently accepted view. A third major argument dealt with the size of the brain and whether relative size or absolute size was more relevant in determining function. In the late 18th century, it was determined that brain to body ratio reduces as body size increases. However more recently, there is more focus on absolute brain size as this scales with internal structures and functions, with the degree of structural complexity, and with the amount of white matter in the brain, all suggesting that absolute size is much better predictor of brain function. Finally, a fourth argument is that of natural selection (Darwinism) versus developmental constraints (concerted evolution). It is now accepted that the evolution of development is what causes adult species to show differences and evolutionary neuroscientists maintain that many aspects of brain function and structure are conserved across species.

=== Techniques ===
Throughout history, we see how evolutionary neuroscience has been dependent on developments in biological theory and techniques. The field of evolutionary neuroscience has been shaped by the development of new techniques that allow for the discovery and examination of parts of the nervous system. In 1873, C. Golgi devised the silver nitrate method which allowed for the description of the brain at the cellular level as opposed to simply the gross level. Santiago and Pedro Ramon used this method to analyze numerous parts of brains, broadening the field of comparative neuroanatomy. In the second half of the 19th century, new techniques allowed scientists to identify neuronal cell groups and fiber bundles in brains. In 1885, Vittorio Marchi discovered a staining technique that let scientists see induced axonal degeneration in myelinated axons, in 1950, the "original nauta procedure" allowed for more accurate identification of degenerating fibers, and in the 1970s, there were several discoveries of multiple molecular tracers which would be used for experiments even today. In the last 20 years, cladistics has also become a useful tool for looking at variation in the brain.

== Evolution of brains ==
Many of Earth's early years were filled with brainless creatures, and among them was the amphioxus, which can be traced as far back as 550 million years ago. Amphioxi had a significantly simpler way of life, which made it not necessary for them to have a brain. To replace its absence of a brain, the prehistoric amphioxi had a limited nervous system, which was composed of only a bunch of cells. These cells optimized their uses because many of the cells for sensing intertwined with the cells used for its very simple system for moving, which allowed it to propel itself through bodies of water and react without much processing while the cells remaining were used for the detection of light to account to the fact that it had no eyes. It also did not need a sense of hearing. Even though the amphioxi had limited senses, they did not need them to survive efficiently, as their life was mainly dedicated to sitting on the seafloor to eat. Although the amphioxus' "brain" might seem severely underdeveloped compared to their human counterparts, it was set well for its respective environment, which has allowed it to prosper for millions of years.

Although many scientists once assumed that the brain evolved to achieve an ability to think, such a view is today considered a great misconception. 500 million years ago, the Earth entered into the Cambrian period, where hunting became a new concern for survival in an animal's environment. At this point, animals became sensitive to the presence of another, which could serve as food. Although hunting did not inherently require a brain, it was one of the main steps that pushed the development of one, as organisms progressed to develop advanced sensory systems.

In response to progressively complicated surroundings, where competition between animals with brains started to arise for survival, animals had to learn to manage their energy. As creatures acquired a variety of senses for perception, animals progressed to develop allostasis, which played the role of an early brain by forcing the body to gather past experiences to improve prediction. Since prediction beat reaction, organisms who planned their manoeuvres were more likely to survive than those who did not. This came with equally managing energy adequately, which nature favoured. Animals that had not developed allostasis would be at a disadvantage for their purpose of exploration, foraging and reproduction, as death was a higher risk factor.

As allostasis continued to develop in animals, their bodies equally continuously evolved in size and complexity. They progressively started to develop cardiovascular systems, respiratory systems and immune systems to survive in their environments, which required bodies to have something more complex than the limited quality of cells to regulate themselves. This encouraged the nervous systems of many creatures to develop into a brain, which was sizeable and strikingly similar to how most animal brains look today.

== Evolution of the human brain ==
Darwin, in The Descent of Man, stipulated that the mind evolved simultaneously with the body. According to his theory, all humans have a barbaric core that they learn to deal with. Darwin's theory allowed people to start thinking about the way animals and their brains evolve.

=== Reptile brain ===
Plato's insight on the evolution of the human brain contemplated the idea that all humans were once lizards, with similar survival needs such as feeding, fighting and mating. In the classical era Plato first described this concept as the "lizard mind" – the deepest layer and one of three parts of his conception of a three-part human mind. In the 20th century P. MacLean developed a similar, modern triune brain theory.

Recent research in molecular genetics has demonstrated evidence that there is no difference in the neurons that reptiles and nonhuman mammals have when compared to humans. Instead, new research speculates that all mammals, and potentially reptiles, birds and some species of fish, evolve from a common order pattern. This research reinforces the idea that human brains are structurally no t any different from many other organisms.

The cerebral cortex of reptiles resembles that of mammals, although simplified. Although the evolution and function of the human cerebral cortex is still shrouded in mystery, we know that it is the most dramatically changed part of the brain during recent evolution. The reptilian brain, 300 million years ago, was made for all our basic urges and instincts like fighting, reproducing, and mating. The reptile brain evolved 100 million years later and gave us the ability to feel emotion. Eventually, it was able to develop a rational part that controls our inner animal.

=== Visual perception ===
Vision allows humans to process the world surrounding them to a certain extent. Through the wavelengths of light, the human brain can associate them to a specific event. Although the brain obviously perceives its surroundings at a specific moment, the brain equally predicts the upcoming changes in the environment. Once it has noticed them, the brain begins to prepare itself to encounter the new scenario by attempting to develop an adequate response. This is accomplished by using the data the brain has at its access, which can be to use past experiences and memories to form a proper response. However, sometimes the brain fails to predict accurately which means that the mind perceives a false illustration. Such an incorrect image occurs when the brain uses an inadequate memory to respond to what it is facing, which means that the memory does not correlate with the real scenario.

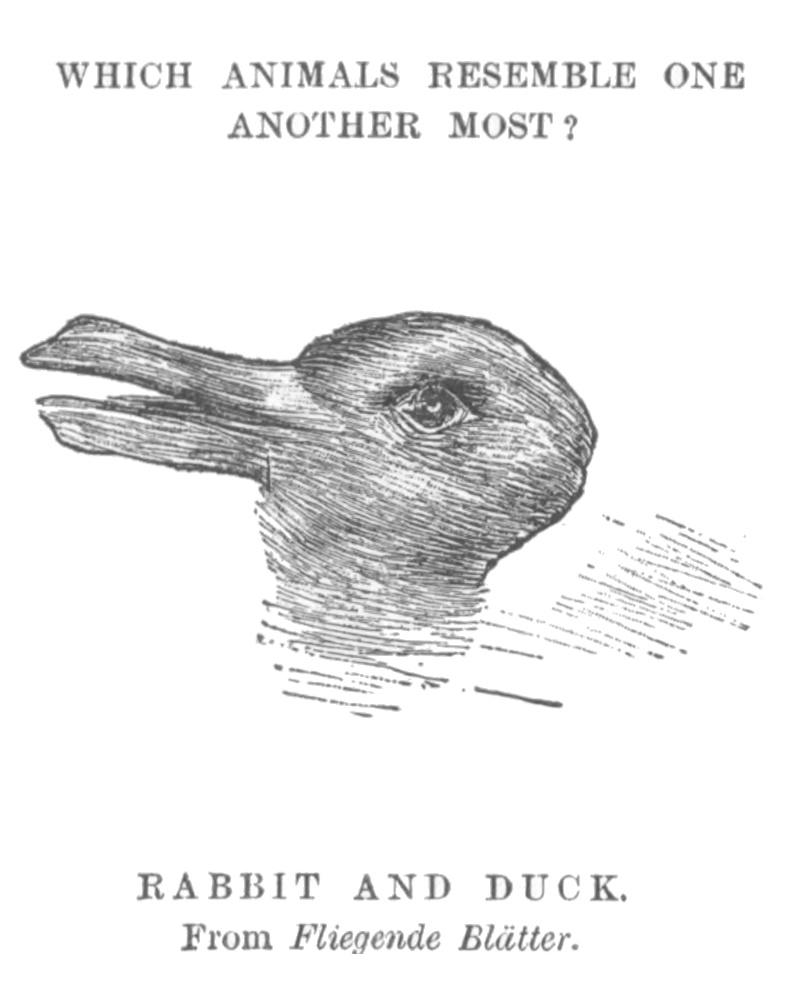
The rabbit–duck illusion is a famous ambiguous image in which a rabbit or a duck can be seen. The earliest known version is an unattributed drawing from the 23 October 1892 issue of Blätter magazine.

Research about how visual perception has developed in evolution is today best understood through studying present-day primates since the organization of the brain cannot be ascertained only by analyzing fossilized skulls.

The brain interprets visual information in the occipital lobe, a region in the back of the brain. The occipital lobe contains the visual cortex and the thalamus, which are the two main actors in processing visual information. The process of interpreting information has proven to be more complex than "what you see is what you get". Misinterpreting visual information is more common than previously believed.

As knowledge of the human brain has evolved, researchers discover that our visual perception is much closer to a construction of the brain than a direct "photograph" of what is in front of us. This can lead to misperceiving certain situations or elements in the brain's attempt to keep us safe. For example, an on-edge soldier believes a young child with a stick is a grown man with a gun, as the brain's sympathetic system, or fight-or-flight mode, is activated.

An example of this phenomenon can be observed in the rabbit–duck illusion. Depending on how the image is looked at, the brain can interpret the image of a rabbit, or a duck. There is no right or wrong answer, but it is proof that what is seen may not be the reality of the situation.

=== Auditory perception ===
The organization of the human auditory cortex is divided into core, belt, and parabelt. This closely resembles that of present-day primates.

The concept of auditory perception resembles visual perception very similarly. Our brain is wired to act on what it expects to experience. The sense of hearing helps situate an individual, but it also gives them hints about what else is around them. If something moves, they know approximately where it is and by the tone of it, the brain can predict what moved. If someone were to hear leaves rustling in a forest, the brain might interpret that sound as being an animal which could be a dangerous factor, but it would simply be another person walking. The brain can predict many things based on what it is interpreting, however, those predictions may not all be true.

=== Language development ===
Evidence of a rich cognitive life in primate relatives of humans is extensive, and a wide range of specific behaviours in line with Darwinian theory is well documented. However, until recently, research has disregarded nonhuman primates in the context of evolutionary linguistics, primarily because unlike vocal learning birds, our closest relatives seem to lack imitative abilities. Evolutionary speaking, there is great evidence suggesting a genetic groundwork for the concept of languages has been in place for millions of years, as with many other capabilities and behaviours observed today.

While evolutionary linguists agree on the fact that volitional control over vocalizing and expressing language is a quite recent leap in the history of the human race, that is not to say auditory perception is a recent development as well. Research has shown substantial evidence of well-defined neural pathways linking cortices to organize auditory perception in the brain. Thus, the issue lies in our abilities to imitate sounds.

Beyond the fact that primates may be poorly equipped to learn sounds, studies have shown them to learn and use gestures far better. Visual cues and motoric pathways developed millions of years earlier in our evolution, which seems to be one reason for our earlier ability to understand and use gestures.

=== Cognitive specializations ===
Evolution shows how certain environments and surroundings will favor the development of specific cognitive functions of the brain to aid an animal or in this case human to successfully live in that environment.

Cognitive specialization in a theory in which cognitive functions, such as the ability to communicate socially, can be passed down genetically through offspring. This would benefit species in the process of natural selection. As for studying this in relation to the human brain, it has been theorized that very specific social skills apart from language, such as trust, vulnerability, navigation, and self-awareness can also be passed by offspring.

== Researchers ==
- J. Allman
- S. Baron-Cohen
- L.F. Barrett
- W.H. Calvin
- D.L. Cheney
- Paul Cisek
- G.E. Coghill
- E.C. Crosby
- T. Deacon
- M. Donald
- L. Edinger
- T. Edinger
- S. Herculano-Houzel
- C. Judson Herrick
- Nils Holmgren
- G. Carl Huber
- J. B. Johnston
- J.H. Kaas
- Olaf Larsell
- P.D. MacLean
- R.G. Northcutt
- James W. Papez
- G.E. Smith
- G.F. Striedter

== See also ==
- Evolution of the brain
- Evolution of nervous systems
- Evolutionary physiology
- Evolutionary psychology
- Evolutionary psychiatry
- FOXP2 and human evolution
- Neuroethology
