= Brain, Behavior and Evolution =

Peer-reviewed scientific journal

- Discipline: Neuroscience, evolutionary biology
- Language: English
- Edited by: Georg F. Striedter

Publication details
- History: 1968–present
- Publisher: Karger Publishers
- Frequency: 8/year
- Impact factor: 1.915 (2016)

Standard abbreviations
- ISO 4: Brain Behav. Evol.

Indexing
- CODEN: BRBEBE
- ISSN: 0006-8977 (print); 1421-9743 (web)
- LCCN: 75000121
- OCLC no.: 924702123

Links
- Journal homepage

Brain, Behavior and Evolution is a peer-reviewed scientific journal covering evolutionary neurobiology. It was established in 1968 with Walter Riss as the founding editor-in-chief; he remained the editor until 1986. Subsequent editors included Glenn Northcutt (1986–1998) and Walter Wilczynski (1999–2009). The current editor-in-chief is Georg F. Striedter (University of California, Irvine). According to the Journal Citation Reports, the journal has a 2016 impact factor of 1.915.
