= University of Lethbridge Students' Union =

University of Lethbridge Students' Union (ULSU)
- Institution: University of Lethbridge
- Location: 4401 University Drive; Room SU180; Lethbridge, Alberta; T1K 3M8
- Established: 1967
- President: Alejandro Figueroa
- Vice presidents: Kimoya Edwards (Academic), Rylee Mae (External), Orion Legg (Operations & Finance), Kavindu Sumanasena (Student Affairs)
- Members: ~ 8000 Undergraduate students
- Affiliations: CASA, CAUS
- Website: www.ulsu.ca

The University of Lethbridge Students' Union (ULSU) is a non-profit organization representing interests of undergraduate students studying at the University of Lethbridge.

With approximately 7800 students on the main Lethbridge campus and 500 students in the Calgary campus, the ULSU administers student affairs, including advocacy, committee representation, student services, and events.

== Authority ==
The ULSU is not a university department; it is an independent organization, established in 1967 by the Lieutenant Governor in Council, of Alberta. It reports to the provincial government rather than university administration.

The ULSU receives authority to conduct business through the Post-Secondary Learning Act of Alberta (PSLA). The Act establishes all student associations in Alberta as a corporation, whose members are the students of the public post-secondary institution.

The PSLA allows student associations to administer student affairs, promote general student welfare, create governing documents, acquire property, and maintain the organization through the levy of mandatory fees.

== Representation ==
Federally, the University of Lethbridge Students' Union participates in the Canadian Alliance of Students Associations, and provincially, they are a member of the Council of Alberta University Students. Council members sit on the Social Housing and Action Committee and the Plan-Your-City Advisory Committee through the City of Lethbridge. Councils in the past have held seats on other municipal committees. Council members sit on numerous committees within the University of Lethbridge itself as well.

== See also ==
- List of Alberta students' associations
- University of Lethbridge
- Lethbridge
