= Visual Neuroscience (journal) =

- Discipline: Neuroscience, Perception
- Language: English
- Edited by: Paul R. Martin

Publication details
- History: 1988 - present
- Publisher: Cambridge University Press
- Open access: Full
- Impact factor: 3 (2019)

Standard abbreviations
- ISO 4: Vis. Neurosci.

Indexing
- ISSN: 0952-5238 (print); 1469-8714 (web)

Links
- Journal homepage

Visual Neuroscience is a peer-reviewed scientific journal covering experimental and theoretical research in basic visual neuroscience. The editor-in-chief is Paul R Martin of the University of Sydney.

According to the Journal Citation Reports, Visual Neuroscience had a 2019 impact factor of 3, placing it 139th out of 271 in the neurosciences and 13th out of 60 for ophthalmology.
