= March of Genoa =

Medieval Italian state

The March of Genoa or Eastern Liguria was created in 961 by Holy Roman Emperor Otto I.

== History ==
The formal history of the march began around 951 after Berengar of Ivrea became the king of Italy. At that time Berengar completed the reorganization of the military districts south of the Po River that was begun by his predecessor Hugh of Arles to defend against attacks by the Saracens from the sea. In doing so, he formed three new territories, for which he appointed margraves with loyal followers:

- Marquisate of Turin, which came to be known for a short period as Marca Arduinica based upon Berengar's appointment of Arduin Glaber as the margrave.
- Western Liguria, which came to be known for a short period as Marca Aleramica based upon Berengar's appointment of his son-in-law, Aleramo as the margrave.
- Eastern Liguria, which came to be known for a short period as Marca Obertenga based upon Berengar's appointment of Oberto of Luni as the margrave. This territory was also known as the marca Januensis or March of Genoa as its capital city was Genoa.

In 961, Otto invaded Italy and displaced Berengar. Otto then continued the work that had been done to reorganize the northwest into the three great marches. For the Marquisate of Turin (Marca Arduinica), Otto reappointed Arduin Glaber as margrave. For Western Liguria (Marca Aleramica), Otto reconfirmed Aleramo's titles and position. For Eastern Liguria (Marca Obertenga), Otto returned Oberto to his lands, with the title of count palatine. As originally configured, the March of Genoa comprised the modern counties of Luni, Tortona, Milan, and Genoa.

The march was originally held in the elder line of the Obertenghi, descended from Oberto I. The title marchio became common in the family. Albert Azzo II was called marchio de L(a/o)ngobardia. By his time, the march was often called the March of Milan or Liguria. His grandson, Obizzo I, became the first Margrave of Este in 1173 and was created "Margrave of Milan and Genoa" in 1184 by the Emperor Frederick I. From thereafter, the title of Este had more importance, especially with the growth of the commune of Milan and the Republic of Genoa.

== Margraves ==
- Oberto I, 961–c.997
- Adalbert, c.997
- Oberto II, c.997–c.1013
- Albert Azzo I, c.1013–c.1029
- Albert Azzo II, c.1029–1097
- Fulk I, 1097–c.1146
- Obizzo I, c.1146–1193
