= Adalberto the Margrave =

Italian nobleman (fl. 915–951)

Adalberto the Margrave (also known as "il Margravio" or Adalberto III; fl. 915–951) was an Italian nobleman associated with the Obertenghi family. He is considered a prominent ancestor of the House of Este, the Pallavicini family, and the Malaspina family.

== Biography and family ties ==
Adalberto was elevated to the nobiliary title of visconte (viscount) in 940 and came to be known as Adalberto III. He also held the title of marchese d'Italia (marquis of Italy) and ruled over the Margraviate of Milan, which encompassed most of what is now Lombardy and approximately half of present-day Liguria.

It is not clear who his parents were. He is believed to have been either the firstborn son of Lambert, Margrave of Tuscany, or of Lambert's brother, Guy, Margrave of Tuscany, who was married to Marozia.

He served as Count and Duke of Lucca, and later as Margrave of Tuscany from 915 to 929. Adalberto is regarded as the forefather of the Obertenghi family. A junior branch of the family, the Miagro family of Liguria—also known as Miagro dei Obertenghi—was among the most influential noble lineages of the Italian Middle Ages, sharing ancestry with the Pallavicini family and the Malaspina family.

The Obertenghi family split into two major branches through the sons of Albert Azzo II, Margrave of Milan. The younger son, Fulco I, Margrave of Milan, founded the influential North Italian House of Este, which ruled the Duchy of Ferrara and the Duchy of Modena and Reggio until its extinction in 1829. The elder son, Welf I, Duke of Bavaria, established the German Younger House of Welf after inheriting the estates of his maternal uncle, Welf III, the last of the Elder Welfs.

From 1692 to 1901, the House of Welf included the monarchs of Great Britain, and notable figures such as Otto IV, Holy Roman Emperor and Ivan VI of Russia were also members. Although they lost the British crown due to the succession of Edward VII, a member of the House of Wettin, the Hanoverian branch of the Welfs still exists. All living agnatic male descendants trace their lineage to Ernest Augustus, Duke of Brunswick, making him a 30th-generation descendant of Adalberto.

In addition to the House of Hanover, Adalberto's agnatic lineage continues through branches such as the Pallavicini family.

== Offspring ==
- Oberto I (died 975), Marquise of Milan from 951, he later became palatine count in 953 as well as the count of Luni, Genoa and Tortona
- Ambroso (died 988), he was the bishop of Aléria in Corsica
