= Adela of Milan =

Northern Italian noblewoman

- Born: c. 975
- Died: after 1012
- Noble family: Obertenghi
- Spouse: Albert Azzo I, Margrave of Milan
- Issue: Albert Azzo II; Adela of Saluzzo

Adela of Milan (c. 975 – after 1012) was a northern Italian noblewoman. Through her marriage to Albert Azzo I, Margrave of Milan, Adela was Margravine of Milan.

== Life ==
Adela's parents and dynasty are unknown, although it has been suggested that she was related to Lanfranc, Count of Piacenza and of Aucia (a medieval county which consisted of territory between Parma, Piacenza and Cremona). Adela first appears in the historical record in 1011, when she purchased goods from a deacon named Donninus. The following year, Adela bought 250 yokes of land from Donninus. Also in 1012 Adela granted 290 yokes of land to the church of Cremona, with the consent of her husband, and Count Lanfranc. These transactions may have been intended to protect their property from confiscation: Adela's husband Adalbert Azzo supported Arduin of Ivrea against the Emperor Henry II in the war for the Italian throne.

== Marriage and children ==
With her husband, Adalbert Azzo, Adela had at least two children:

- Albert Azzo II
- Adela of Saluzzo, who married Anselm II, margrave of Saluzzo (d. before 1055)

== Sources ==
- Adele Markgräfin von Mailand (in German)
