= Adela of Saluzzo =

Italian noblewoman (c. 995 – after 1055)

Adela of Milan
- Arms of the Obertenghi
- Born: c. 995
- Died: after 1055 (aged 60–61)
- Noble family: Obertenghi
- Spouse: Anselm II of Savona
- Issue: Otto II del Vasto; Hugo II del Vasto
- Father: Albert Azzo I, Margrave of Milan
- Mother: Adelaide of Sabbioneta

Adela of Milan, also Adelasia (c. 995 – after 1055) was a northern Italian noblewoman of the Obertenghi dynasty who became margravine of Savona through her marriage to margrave Anselm II of the Aleramici dynasty. She is an ancestor of the House of Il Vasto, including the margraves of Saluzzo, for which she is wrongly noted by some authors as "Adela of Saluzzo" (fiefdom which was later acquired by her grandson Boniface del Vasto).

== Life ==
She was born in an unknown date to Albert Azzo I, Margrave of Milan and Adelaide of Sabbioneta., therefore a sister to Alberto Azzo II, founder of the House of Este.

Through her marriage to Anselm II, margrave of Savona, she was the mother of the margraves of Savona and Il Bosco, the two original branches of the House of Il Vasto.

In may 1055 se donated property to the abby of San Pietro in Savigliano in which she also promised not to disturb the property of the abby of San Marziano beside her husband and two surviving children.

== Marriage and children ==
Adela married Anselm II, Margrave of Savona, with whom she had the following children:

- Otto II "Teuto", margrave of Savona. Married Bertha of Turin, daughter of Ulric Manfred II, margrave of Turin, and Bertha of Milan.
- Hugo II, margrave of Il Bosco. Married Agnese d'Este, daughter or granddaughter of Alberto Azzo II, margrave of Milan.
- Anselm (died childless at a young age).

== Sources ==
- Adele Markgräfin von Saluzzo (in German)
