= Abbey of Vangadizza =

Building in Badia Polesine, Italy

Coordinates: 45°5′46.9″N 11°29′26.1″E

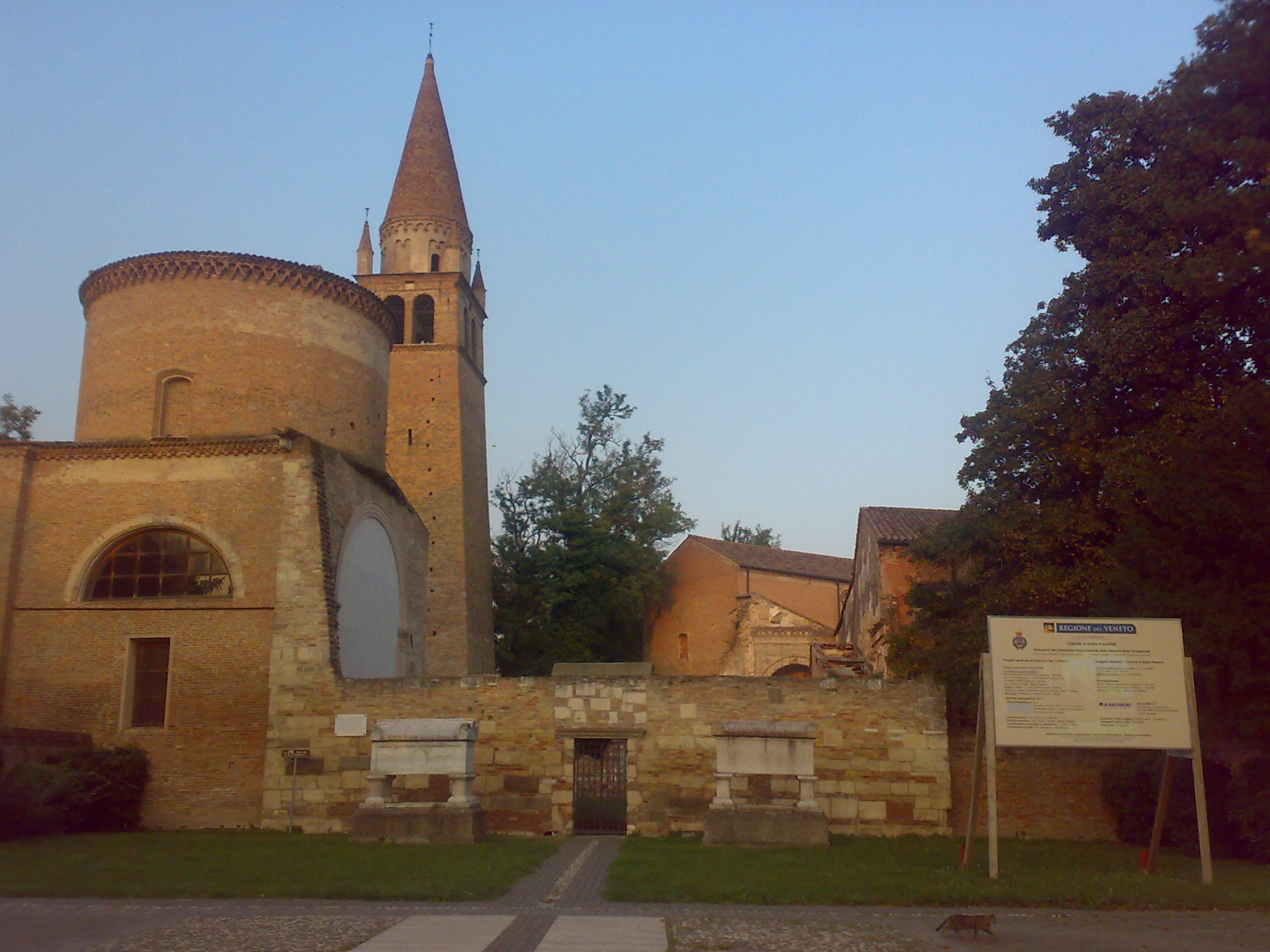
Vangadizza Abbey

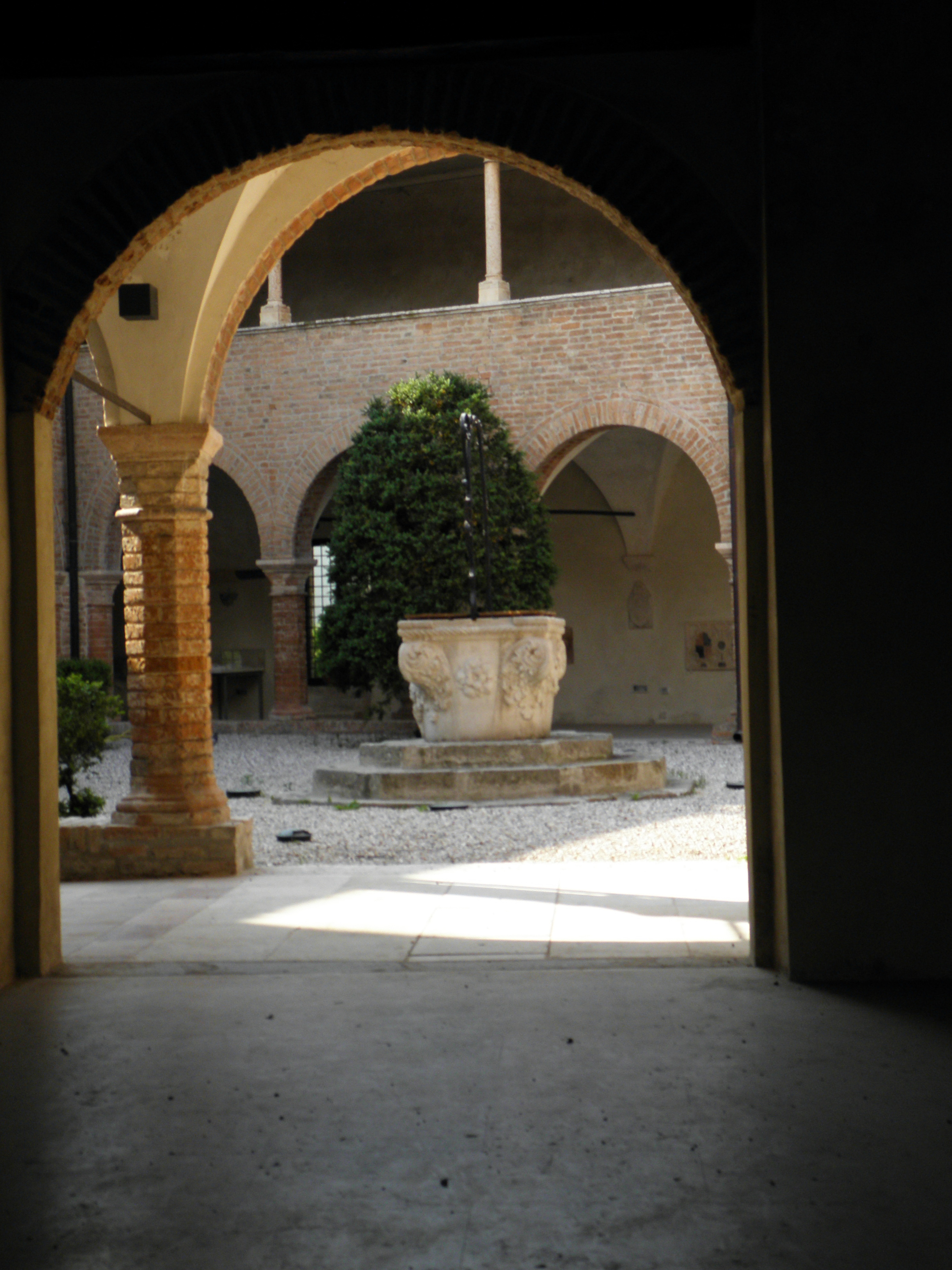
View of the cloister.

Vangadizza Abbey (Italian: Abbazia della Vangadizza) is a former Benedictine abbey in the modern comune of Badia Polesine, northern Italy. It was an independent state from the early Middle Ages until the 14th century.

== History ==
The creation of the abbey is generally connected with the large donations from marquis Aimeric of Mantua, in the 950s, followed by others from Hugh of Tuscanya few years later. The abbey is mentioned as still in construction in a document from 993.

It became an independent fief in 996 and, around 1000, the abbey received the status of diocese directly subject to the Holy See. The independence was confirmed by emperor Frederick Barbarossa in 1177 and by Pope Celestine III in 1196.

In 1213 the abbey adhered to the Camaldolese order, dedicating itself in particular to cultural activities: it amassed a large library and included a school of philosophy, theology, chant, arts and sciences, although it got progressively detached from the care of the territory and from its colonists, which had been the base of its richness in the previous centuries.

In the early 15th century the abbey lost its temporal rights, and was put under the in commendam status, i.e. under the control of external ecclesiastics. Its lay abbots include Pietro Ottoboni, the future Pope Alexander VIII. A seminary was founded in 1747. The Republic of Venice suppressed it on 11 April 1789 and seized its asset; the diocese was also suppressed in 1792, its twelve parishes being moved to the diocese of Adria.

It was partially demolished from 1810, when the complex was under French control.

== Description ==
Due to the early 19th century demolitions, only the apse chapel, the bell tower and a few other structures remain of the original Romanesque-Gothic structure. The base of the bell tower include antique elements, such a bas-relief with a Maenad, dating from the 1st century AD.

Other sights include the 13th century portico-courtyard, with Verona marble columns, and a 15th-century chapel dedicated to the Holy Virgin. The apse has frescoes by Filippo Zaniberti (early 17th century), depicting the Miracles of the Virgin.

The square in front the church houses two sarcophagi of members of the Este family, including the tomb of Albert Azzo II, Margrave of Milan, and that of Azzo VI of Este.

== Sources ==
- Gabrielli, Alberino (1993). Comunità e chiese nella diocesi di Adria-Rovigo. Rome: Ciscra.
