= Palazzo Mocenigo, Este =

Residence in Padua, Italy

Coordinates: 45.2292°N 11.6566°E

The Palazzo Mocenigo is an aristocratic residence built on the foundations of the Carrara castle in Este, province of Padua, region of Veneto, Italy.

The palace was erected by the Venetian patrician of the Mocenigo family in the 16th century. The facade was built atop the foundations of the wall of the 14th-century Carrara castle, built when they were lords of Este. Originally, the palace was twice the size but one wing was destroyed by fire in 1785. The present palace is occupied by the Museo Nazionale Atestino. Only three rooms in Piano Nobile contain original frescoes from the 17th century, attributed to Giulio Carpioni.
