= Oberto I =

Italian nobleman

Oberto I Obizzo (also known as Otbert) (born around 910; died 15 October 975) was an Italian count palatine and margrave and the oldest known member of the Obertenghi family.

== Biography ==
Oberto I inherited the countship of Milan in 951 from his father Adalberto the Margrave.

Soon after assuming the Italian throne, Berengar II reorganised his territories south of the Po River, dividing them into three new marches (frontier districts) named after their respective margraves: the marca Aleramica of Aleram of Montferrat, the marca Arduinica of Arduin Glaber, and the marca Obertenga of Oberto. This last division consisted of eastern Liguria and was also known as the marca Januensis or March of Genoa. It consisted of Tuscany with the cities of Genoa, Luni, Tortona, Parma, and Piacenza.

In 960, he had to take refuge in Germany. The next year, Pope John XII asked Otto I of Germany to intervene in Italy to protect him from Berengar. When Otto took control of Italy, Oberto was able to return to his lands, with the title of count palatine confirmed by Otto.

He was succeeded as Count of Milan by his son Adalberto II of Milan who at a later time was succeeded by Oberto II. His great-grandson Albert Azzo II, Margrave of Milan founded the House of Este.
