= Tauria gens =

Ancient Roman family

The gens Tauria was an obscure plebeian family at ancient Rome. No members of this gens appear in history, but a number are known from inscriptions.

== Origin ==
The nomen Taurius is derived from the Latin surname Taurus, referring to a bull. Chase lists it among those gentilicia that either originated at Rome, or cannot be shown to have come from anywhere else.

== Praenomina ==
The Taurii known from epigraphy bore a variety of common praenomina, including Lucius, Gaius, Marcus, and Publius, each of which was among the most abundant names at all periods of Roman history, as well as the old but less common praenomen Tiberius.

== Members ==
This list includes abbreviated praenomina. For an explanation of this practice, see filiation.

- Lucius Taurius L. f., one of the magistrates of Carthago Nova in Hispania Citerior in an uncertain year toward the end of the first century BC.
- Lucius Taurius Secundus, a native of Parma in Cisalpine Gaul, paymaster of the century of Kanus, in the third cohort of the praetorian guard in AD 143.
- Publius Taurius Secundus, named in a first- or second-century sepulchral inscription from Aquileia in Venetia and Histria, along with Tauria Primula.
- Tauria Primula, named in a first- or second-century sepulchral inscription from Aquileia, along with Publius Taurius Secundus.
- Tauria M. l. Tyche, a freedwoman, dedicated a family sepulchre at Patavium in Venetia and Histria, dating from the late first or early second century, for herself, her husband, Titus Annius Cerinthus, and their daughter, Annia Pieris.
- Taurius Myro, named in a third-century sepulchral inscription from Rome.
- Taurius, dedicated a fourth-century sepulchral monument at Rome.

=== Undated Taurii ===
- Tauria Nice, dedicated a monument at Ostia in Latium for her husband, Lucius Cornelius Herculanus.
- Gaius Taurius Primitivus, one of the mourners named on the monument of Arminia Gorgilla, a young woman buried at Rome, aged fifteen years, five months, and six days.
- Tiberius Taurius Taurus, son of one of the municipal duumvirs at Augustoritum in Gallia Aquitania.
- Tauria Titiola, a descendant of the Haedui, buried at Lugdunum in Gallia Lugdunensis, with a monument from her husband, Maternus.
- Gaius Taurius Ursinus, buried at Ateste in Venetia and Histria, with a monument from his wife, Valeria Rhodine.

== See also ==
- List of Roman gentes

== Bibliography ==
- Theodor Mommsen et alii, Corpus Inscriptionum Latinarum (The Body of Latin Inscriptions, abbreviated CIL), Berlin-Brandenburgische Akademie der Wissenschaften (1853–present).
- Giovanni Battista de Rossi, Inscriptiones Christianae Urbis Romanae Septimo Saeculo Antiquiores (Christian Inscriptions from Rome of the First Seven Centuries, abbreviated ICUR), Vatican Library, Rome (1857–1861, 1888).
- René Cagnat et alii, L'Année épigraphique (The Year in Epigraphy, abbreviated AE), Presses Universitaires de France (1888–present).
- George Davis Chase, "The Origin of Roman Praenomina", in Harvard Studies in Classical Philology, vol. VIII, pp. 103–184 (1897).
- D.P. Simpson, Cassell's Latin and English Dictionary, Macmillan Publishing Company, New York (1963).
