= San Martino, Este =

Medieval Romanesque church in Este, Veneto, Italy

Church of San Martino
- Chiesa di San Martino
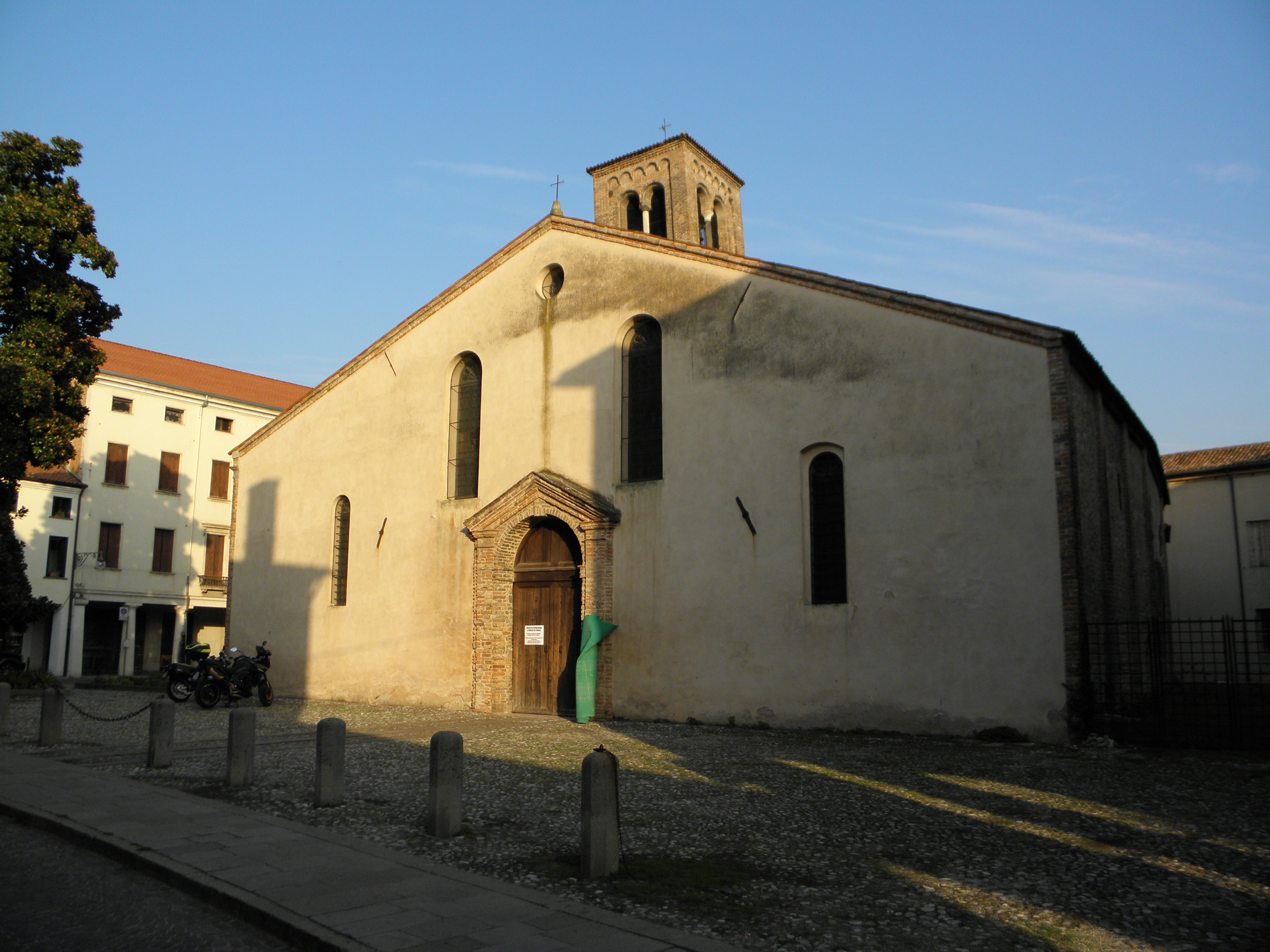
- Church of San Martino
- Location: Este, Veneto, Italy
- Denomination: Catholic Church

History
- Dedication: Saint Martin of Tours

Architecture
- Style: Romanesque
- Groundbreaking: 13th–14th centuries

Administration
- Diocese: Diocese of Padua

The Church of San Martino is a religious building in Este, in the Province of Padua and the Diocese of Padua. It is a chapel of ease of the Basilica of Santa Maria delle Grazie and belongs to the Vicariate of Este.

Dating back at least to the 11th century, it is the oldest church in the city.

== History ==
The earliest documents attesting to the existence of the church date to the early 11th century, although it is possible that an earlier structure existed before that time. Its dedication to Saint Martin of Tours, a 4th-century bishop, has led some scholars to suggest that the church may have been founded during the Lombard or Carolingian period. An ancient note preserved in a manuscript held in the archive of the Magnifica Comunità di Este records the phrase "a Longobardis Ecclesia divi Martini constructa fuit", meaning "the church of Saint Martin was built by the Lombards".

A plaque embedded in the northern wall of the bell tower states that the bell tower and the apse, the oldest surviving structures of the present building, were rebuilt in 1293.

Over the centuries, the church underwent several modifications without substantially altering its medieval layout. In particular, the apse was enlarged between the late 13th and early 14th centuries by incorporating an adjacent chapel dedicated to Saint Lawrence. In the 17th century, the façade was moved westward, lengthening the nave by about four metres; the bell tower was incorporated into the structure, and the interior was divided into three naves.

Restoration works were carried out in the 19th and 20th centuries. Between 1940 and 1941, a building and a timber storage structure attached to the church were removed, while the interior flooring was rebuilt during restoration campaigns carried out between 1987 and 1997.

Until 1771, the Church of San Martino served as a parish church. From 1 June of that year, the parish seat was transferred to the nearby Basilica of Santa Maria delle Grazie.

== Description ==
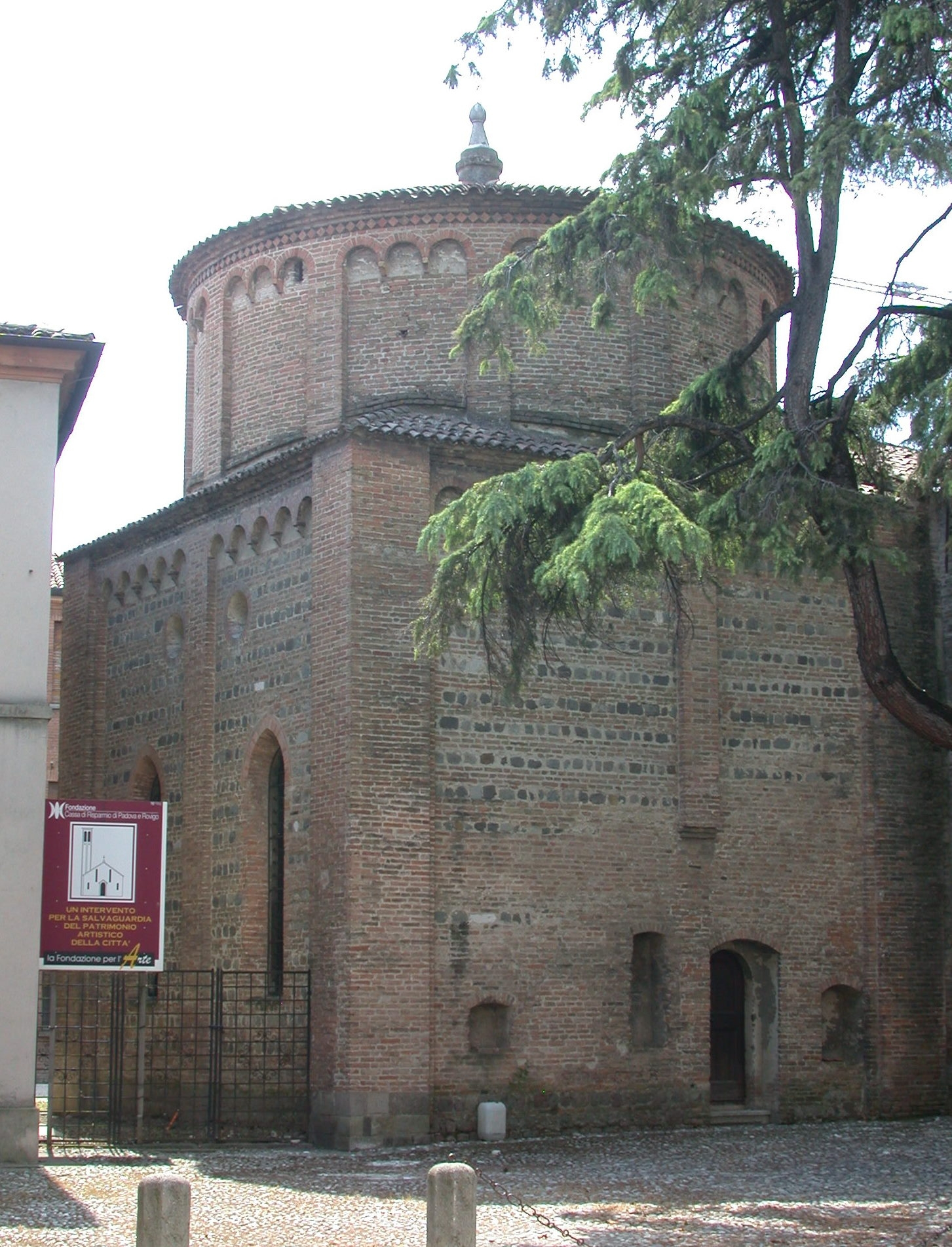
Rear view of the church

The church is located in the historic centre of Este, a short distance from Piazza Maggiore, and runs alongside Via Principe Umberto.

The apse, together with the bell tower, is the oldest part of the building. It has a cubic shape surmounted by a cylindrical tiburium protecting a hemispherical dome, inside which fragments of a starry-sky decoration are still visible.

The bell tower, incorporated into the building's plan, is Romanesque in style and, together with the apse, represents the oldest structure of the church. A plaque embedded in one of its walls dates its construction to 1293. The tower is about 23 metres high and is characterized by a pronounced inclination, documented since at least the 15th century, which does not compromise its stability.

The gabled façade, also Romanesque in style, is probably later than the apse and bell tower. It is characterized by a simple, undecorated appearance, suggesting either rapid construction or limited economic resources at the time of its completion.

The interior, modified in the 17th century, is divided into three naves separated by plastered masonry columns and covered by a wooden truss roof. At the end of the central nave, beneath the hemispherical dome, lies the presbytery with the high altar made of Carrara marble by the sculptor Antonio Bonazza between 1741 and 1743. The altar, restored in 1998, features a marble tabernacle flanked by two marble sculptures of angels.

Although the original fresco decoration of the apse has been lost, a mid-14th-century fresco depicting the Crucifixion of Christ, inspired by Giottesque models, survives in the Chapel of Saint Lawrence along the right nave. Along the wall of the nave are fragments of a triptych depicting the Madonna and Child with St Peter and other saints and a Crucifixion of St Margaret of Antioch. In the left nave, a 16th-century polychrome marble altar, commissioned by the Rota family and originally dedicated to St Stephen, once held statues in niches depicting Saints Roch, Stephen, and Sebastian, but now displayed in the Museo Nazionale Atestino. The predella of the altar has reliefs of events of the life of the three saints: Roch captured and led to jail, St Stephen's Martyrdom and St Sebastian's Martyrdom.

In the 19th century, most of the canvases were removed, including a painting of the Martyrdom of St Lawrence by a painter of the school of Tintoretto, and other paintings by Antonio Zanchi.

== See also ==
- Roman Catholic Diocese of Padua
- Basilica of Santa Maria delle Grazie
