= Pinnia gens =

Plebeian family in ancient Rome

The gens Pinnia was an obscure plebeian family at ancient Rome. Few members of this gens are mentioned in history, and few of them attained any of the higher offices of the Roman state, although a few became local governors, and at least one, Lucius Pinnius Porphyrio, held the quaestorship. Many others are known from inscriptions.

== Praenomina ==
The main praenomina of the Pinnii were Titus and Lucius. They occasionally used Quintus and Gaius, and there are instances of Marcus, Aulus, and Publius.

== Members ==
This list includes abbreviated praenomina. For an explanation of this practice, see filiation.

- Quintus Pinnius, a friend of Marcus Terentius Varro, the antiquarian, who mentions him in Rerum Rusticarum, his treatise on agriculture.
- Titus Pinnius, a friend of Cicero, who mentions him in one of his letters.
- Lucius Pinnius Celer, a soldier named in an inscription from Rome, dating to AD 70.
- Titus Pinnius Hilarus, made a contract with Publius Decimius Epagathus in March, AD 102.
- Titus Pinnius Primigenius, together with his wife, Fannia Sabina, dedicated a tomb at Rome for their house slave, Honorata, aged six years, seven months, and twenty-seven days, with an inscription dating to the second century AD, or the latter part of the first.
- Marcus Pinnius M. l. Surus, a freedman buried at Rome, in a tomb dating to the second century.
- Pinnia Restuta, a freedwoman buried at Rome, in the tomb of Marcus Pinnius Surus.
- Quintus Pinnius Onesimus, one of the priests at Ostia in Latium in AD 151.
- Pinnius Aurelius Venerius, buried at Puteoli in Campania, aged about fifty, according to an inscription belonging to the late third or early fourth centuries AD

=== Pinnii of uncertain era ===
- Lucius Pinnius, Praefectus Augustalis, named in an inscription from Gabii in Latium.
- Quintus Pinnius, one of the septemviri epulones at Ravenna in Venetia and Histria.
- Pinnia L. l., a freedwoman buried at Tibur in Latium.
- Quintus Pinnius Q. l, buried at Adria in Venetia and Histria.
- Lucius Pinnius L. l. Acastus, a freedman buried at Tibur.
- Gaius Pinnius C. f. Agrippa, buried in Achaia, aged twenty-two.
- Titus Pinnius T. l. Anteros, a freedman named in an inscription from Rome.
- Titus Pinnius T. l. Cavarius, a freedman, and the brother of Pinnia Plecte and Pinnius Januarius, buried at Bouthoe in Dalmatia.
- Lucius Pinnius S. f. Celsus, buried at Rome, aged eighteen years, four days.
- Lucius Pinnius L. l. Cerdo, buried at Rome.
- Gaius Pinnius Chrysanthus, father of Gaius Pinnius Natalis and Pinnia Natalia, who died in childhood.
- Titus Pinnius Corinthus, husband of Livia Poppaea, and father of two daughters named Pinnia Poppaea, who died in childhood.
- Pinnia Didyma, wife of Titus Pinnius Hermes, who built a tomb for her at Rome.
- Titus Pinnius Epaphroditus, buried at the present site of Castel Gandolfo in Latium, aged eighteen years, five months.
- Quintus Pinnius Felix, one of the priests as Portus in Latium.
- Titus Pinnius Festus, named in an inscription from Rome as one of the donors of a pot.
- Titus Pinnius T. f. Firmus, named in an inscription from Ateste in Venetia and Histria.
- Lucius Pinnius L. f. Fortis, son of Lucius Pinnius Valens and Pinnia Procula, buried in a family sepulchre at Ostia.
- Titus Pinnius Fortis, heir under the will of Lucius Birronius Quartonius.
- Pinnius Graptus, named in an inscription from Rome.
- Pinnius Hermeros, husband of Claudia, named in an inscription from Tarvisium in Venetia and Histria.
- Titus Pinnius Hermes, husband of Pinnia Didyma, for whom he built a tomb at Rome.
- Pinnia T. l. Hilara, a freedwoman named in an inscription from Rome.
- Titus Pinnius Hilarus, buried at Rome.
- Pinnius Januarius, brother of Titus Pinnius Cavario.
- Titus Pinnius Januarius, husband of Papiria Musa, buried at Salona in Dalmatia, aged thirty.
- Pinnia Joconio, a freedwoman, buried at Rome with Titus Pinnius Tilles.
- Aulus Pinnius Maximus, a senator named in a will from Panormus in Sicily.
- Titus Pinnius T. (f.?) Modestus, named in a funerary inscription for his freedwoman, Pinnia Primigenia.
- Pinnia C. f. Natalia, daughter of Gaius Pinnius Chrysanthus, buried at Brundisium in Calabria, aged six.
- Gaius C. f. Pinnius Natalis, son of Gaius Pinnius Chrysanthus, buried at Brundisium, aged six.
- Lucius Pinnius Nedymus, Praefectus Augustalis, named in an inscription from Gabii.
- Pinnia Plecte, sister of Titus Pinnius Cavarius, for whom she built a monument at Bouthoe.
- Pinnia T. f. Poppaea, infant daughter of Titus Pinnius Corinthus and Livia Poppaea, buried at Rome, aged one year, six months, and five days.
- Pinnia T. f. Poppaea, daughter of Titus Pinnius Corinthus and Livia Poppaea, buried at Rome, aged five years, two months, and twenty days.
- Lucius Pinnius Porphyrio, a quaestor, named in an inscription from Gabii.
- Lucius Pinnius Pri[...], named in an inscription from Tarvisium.
- Pinnia T. l. Primigenia, the freedwoman of Titus Pinnius Modestus, buried at Rome.
- Pinnius Probus, heir of Gaius Aemilius Severus, a centurion buried at Ravenna.
- Pinnia L. l. Procula, the freedwoman and wife of Lucius Pinnius Valens, and mother of Lucius Pinnius Fortis, built a sepulchre at Ostia for her family.
- Gaius Pinnius Provincialis, buried at Aquileia in Venetia and Histria.
- Publius Pinnius Saturninus, buried at Castellum Celtianum in Numidia, aged thirty-one.
- Lucius Pinnius L. l. Sopilus, a freedman, named in a dedicatory inscription from Aquileia.
- Titus Pinnius T. l. Suntrophus, a freedman, who became a vestiarius, or clothier, at Rome.
- Titus Pinnius Tilles, a freedman buried at Rome, together with Pinnia Joconio.
- Lucius Pinnius Valens, the husband and former master of Pinnia Procula, and father of Lucius Pinnius Fortis, buried in the family sepulchre built by his wife at Ostia.
- Marcus Pinnius Valens, a soldier in the praetorian guard, buried at Rome, aged forty-five, having served twenty-four years.
- Lucius Pinnius Zabda, named in an inscription from Tarvisium.
- Tiberius Claudius Pinnius, buried at Ostia, aged fourteen years, three months.

== See also ==
- List of Roman gentes

== Bibliography ==
- Marcus Tullius Cicero, Epistulae ad Familiares.
- Marcus Terentius Varro, Rerum Rusticarum (Rural Matters).
- Dictionary of Greek and Roman Biography and Mythology, William Smith, ed., Little, Brown and Company, Boston (1849).
- Theodor Mommsen et alii, Corpus Inscriptionum Latinarum (The Body of Latin Inscriptions, abbreviated CIL), Berlin-Brandenburgische Akademie der Wissenschaften (1853–present).
- Wilhelm Henzen, Ephemeris Epigraphica: Corporis Inscriptionum Latinarum Supplementum (Journal of Inscriptions: Supplement to the Corpus Inscriptionum Latinarum, abbreviated EE), Institute of Roman Archaeology, Rome (1872–1913).
- Notizie degli Scavi di Antichità (News of Excavations from Antiquity, abbreviated NSA), Accademia dei Lincei (1876–present).
- Ettore Pais, Corporis Inscriptionum Latinarum Supplementa Italica (Italian Supplement to the Corpus Inscriptionum Latinarum), Rome (1884).
- René Cagnat et alii, L'Année épigraphique (The Year in Epigraphy, abbreviated AE), Presses Universitaires de France (1888–present).
- Alfredo Marinucci, Diseicta Membra. Iscrizioni Latine da Ostia e Porto, 1981–2009 (Scattered Limbs: Latin Inscriptions from Ostia and Portus, 1981–2009, abbreviated ILOP), Rome (2012).
- Lucia Avetta, Roma—Via Imperiale. Scavi e Scoperte (1937-1950) nella Costruzione di Via delle Terme di Caracalla e di Via Cristoforo Colombo (Rome—The Imperial Road: Excavationa and Discoveries during the construction of the road to the Baths of Caracalla and Christopher Columbus Street), Rome (1985).
- Giuseppe Camodeca, Puteoli. Istituzioni e società, Naples (2017).
