= Oberto II of Milan =

Margrave of Milan from 975 to 1014

Otbert II, Margrave of Milan
- Born: around 940
- Died: after 1014
- Noble family: Obertenghi
- Spouse: Railenda
- Issue Detail: Albert Azzo I, Margrave of Milan; Bertha of Milan
- Father: Otbert I, Margrave of Milan

Otbert (Latin: Otbertus, Italian: Oberto; born around 940; died after 1014) was Margrave of Milan. A member of the Obertenghi family, he succeeded his father, Otbert I, as margrave after his father's death in 975, together with his brother Adalbert. He was also count of Milan, Genoa, and Bobbio. In 1002, he joined Arduin's revolt against Henry II, Holy Roman Emperor.

== Family ==
Otbert had the following children with Railenda, daughter of Count Riprand, and widow of Sigfred, Count of Seprio:

- Hugh, Margrave of Milan
- Albert Azzo I, Margrave of Milan
- Bertha, married Manfred II, Margrave of Turin, she has by some also been identified as the wife of Arduin, Margrave of Ivrea
- Adalbert IV
- Guido
- Otbert III, Margrave of East Liguria
