= Chiesa della Salute, Este =

Roman Catholic church in Veneto, Italy

The Chiesa della Salute is a baroque-style, Roman Catholic church located in the town of Este in the province of Padova, region of Veneto, Italy. It was erected as a votive church (plague-church) after the cessation of plague epidemic in town.

== History ==
A church at the site was begun in 1639 after the end of a season of plague, and dedicated to an icon of the Madonna discovered while the town was afflicted. Construction restarted in 1640 after a collapse. Built in octagonal layout, it is flanked by two belltowers with lead cupolas.

The interior contains three large altarpieces by Antonio Zanchi, depicting the Presentation of Mary at the Temple, the Marriage of the Virgin, and the 'Annunciation. Other artists with works in the church include Pietro Liberi and Federico Cervelli.
