= Obertenghi =

Parent House of Este, Welf, Hanover and Lorraine

- Marcher noble family
- Coat of arms of the Obertenghi, Marquesses of Milan
- Parent family: Bonifaci
- Country: (Holy Roman Empire) Kingdom of Italy
- Etymology: Descendant from Oberto I
- Place of origin: Probably Pavia or Lombardy
- Founded: 0940; 1086 years ago
- Founder: Adalberto the Margrave
- Current head: None; under the Lex Langobardorum, all descendants of its branches hold equal rights to the headship.
- Final ruler: Albert Azzo II
- Titles: List: Count of Genoa (940–1097); Margrave of Milan (940–1097); Count palatine of Pavia (953–1097); Marquis of Este (1011–1097); Margrave of Ancona (1013–1093); Prince of San Colombano (1011–1097); Prince of the Holy Roman Empire (1011–1097)
- Dissolution: 1097; 929 years ago
- Cadet branches: House of Este; House of Welf; House of Hannover; House of Cavalcabò; Marquises of Gavi; Lupi of Soragna; Meli-Lupi of Soragna; Visconti; Viscounts of Manesseno; House of Spinola; House of De Castro; Malocelli; Embriaco; Viscounts of Carmandino; Visconti delle Isole; House of Fieschi; House of Confalonieri; House of Lacon-Massa; Marquises of Massa; House of Malaspina; House of Pallavicini

The House of Obertenghi was an Italian noble family of Longobard origin. The family rose to prominence in the 10th and 11th centuries. It traced its lineage to Viscount Adalbert III, a Frankish noble and the first Margrave of Milan, who established the family's authority in Northern Italy. The dynasty played a foundational role in the creation of the Marca Obertenga, a vast frontier territory of the Holy Roman Empire that encompassed much of present-day Northwest Italy and parts of Switzerland. The Obertenghi were the progenitors of several important dynasties, including the House of Este, the House of Welf, and later the House of Hanover.

== History ==
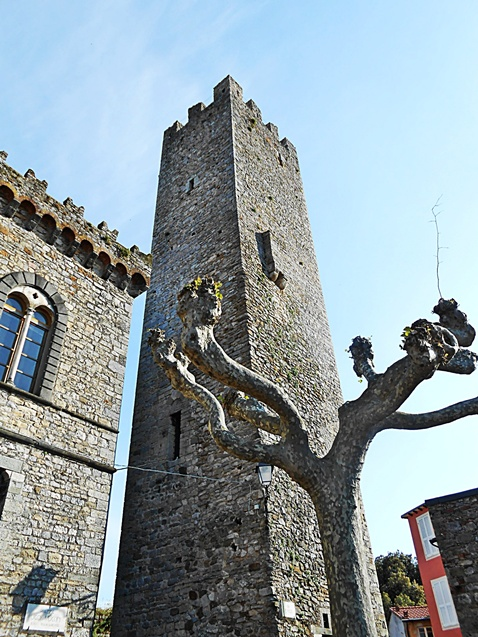
The Torre degli Obertenghi in Arcola, Liguria, traditionally associated with the Obertenghi family.

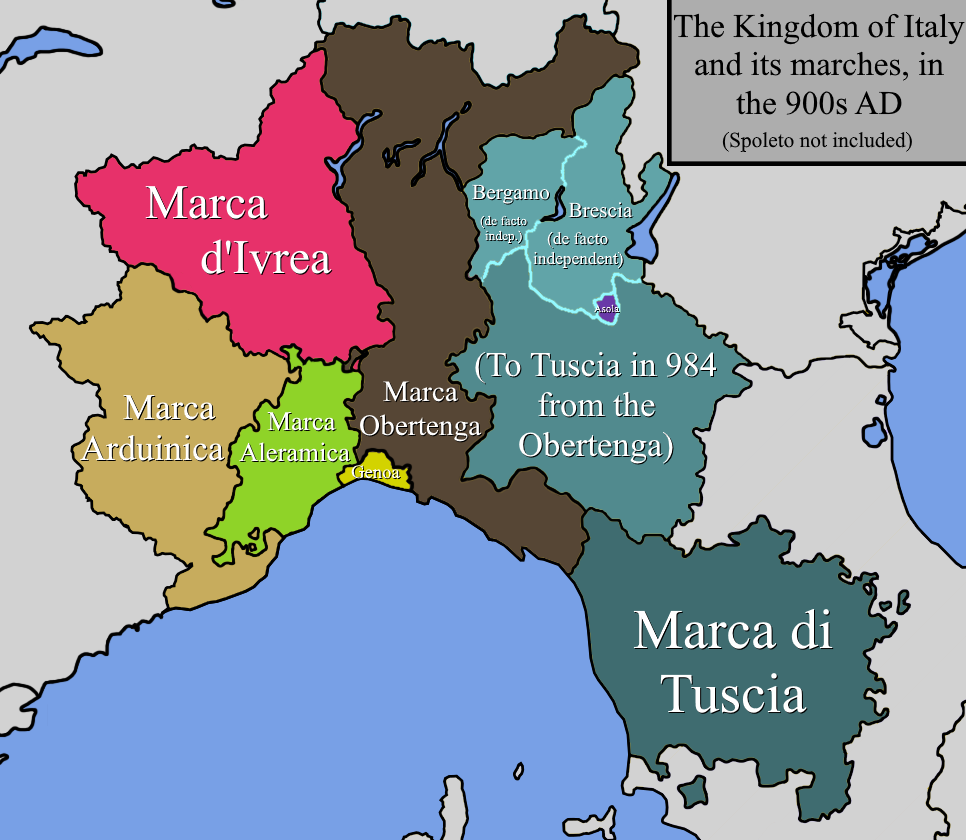
The Marca d'Ivrea, Marca Arduinica, Marca Aleramica, Marca Obertenga, and Marca di Tuscia — subdivisions of the Kingdom of Italy created by Berengar II of Italy in the 10th century. The map also shows Genoa and regions later transferred to Tuscia.

The family held the titles of Marquis of Milan and Genoa, Count of Luni, Tortona, Genoa, and Milan, and served as regents of the march that bore their name in the 10th century, the Marca Obertenga. This territory encompassed most of present-day Northwest Italy and parts of Switzerland.

The dynasty is the progenitor of the widely powerful and prestigious House of Este as well as the House of Welf, the parent house of the Hanoverian dynasty.

Other cadet lines include two of the most ancient Italian noble families: the House of Malaspina and the House of Pallavicini.

In 951, Berengar II of Italy completed the reorganisation of the Italian feudal structure begun by his predecessor, Hugh of Italy. He appointed three new margraves to govern newly defined frontier territories:

- Arduin Glaber was elevated from count to margrave of Turin, overseeing Turin, Ivrea, the Maritime Alps, Nice, Ventimiglia, and Sanremo—a territory later known as the Marca Arduinica of the Arduinici.
- Aleramo, Marquis of Montferrat was appointed margrave of Western Liguria, including Vercelli, Monferrato, Ceva, Acqui Terme, Oneglia, and Albenga—the Marca Aleramica of the Aleramici.
- Oberto I was named margrave of Milan and count of Luni. His domain—covering Milan and Eastern Liguria—included the counties of Genoa, Luni, Tortona, Bobbio, Piacenza, and Parma: the territory known as the Marca Obertenga or the march of the Obertenghi.

== Family heads ==
- 940–951: Adalbert III, (Regent) Margrave of Milan – A Frankish noble, reputed son of Guy, Margrave of Tuscany.
- 951–975: Otbert I, Margrave of Milan, Count of Genoa – Son of Adalbert; forefather of the dynasty from whom the family name derives.
- 975–1002: Adalbert IV, Margrave of Milan, Count of Genoa – First-born son of Otbert I; grandfather of Adalbert II Pelavicino, founder of the Pallavicini family.
- 1002–1014: Otbert II, Margrave of Milan, Count of Genoa – Second-born son of Otbert I; deposed and imprisoned by Emperor Henry II due to his support for Arduin of Ivrea. Father of Obizzo I (third-born son), forefather of the Malaspina family.
- 1014–1024: Hugh, Margrave of Milan, Count of Genoa – First-born son of Otbert II. Appointed by Emperor Henry II, he fell from grace after the emperor's death. Died childless.
- 1024–1029: Albert Azzo I, Margrave of Milan, Count of Genoa – Second-born son of Otbert II. First Marquis of Este (1011).
- 1029–1097: Albert Azzo II, Margrave of Milan, Count of Genoa – Son of Albert Azzo I. Last of the Obertenghi main branch. Succeeded by:
  - From his marriage with Kunigunde of Altdorf: Welf I, founder of the Younger House of Welf.
  - From his marriage with Gersende, Countess of Maine: Faulk I, still Margrave of Milan and founder of the House of Este.
  - Another son with Gersende, Hugh V, inherited the County of Maine, dying childless.

== Family tree ==
Obertenghi Family

Adalberto the Margrave il Margravio or Adalberto III (10th century – 951?)
Oberto I (?–975)	Ambroso; Bishop of Aleria (?–988)
Oberto II ∞ Railenda	Adalberto I ∞ Adelaide	Adalberto III	Anselmo	Guglielmo	Berta ∞ Oberto di Parma	Oberto Obizzo
Ugo	Alberto Azzo I ∞ Adele	Oberto; Obizzo I	Bertha ∞ Ulric Manfred II	Adalberto IV	Anselmo	Oberto III	Adalberto VI	Berta ?–1047 ∞ Lanfranco	Gisella (?) ∞ Anselmo I di Savona
Adele ∞ Aledramo II	Albert Azzo II, Margrave of Milan ∞ Kunigunde of Altdorf ∞ Garsende of Maine ∞ Matilda	Alberto I	Adalberto V	Adalberto II Pallavicino	Ugo
House of Este	Oberto Obizzo II; Malaspina family	Pallavicini family	House of Cavalcabò

== See also ==
- Kingdom of Italy (Holy Roman Empire)
