= Museo Nazionale Atestino =

Museum in Este, Italy

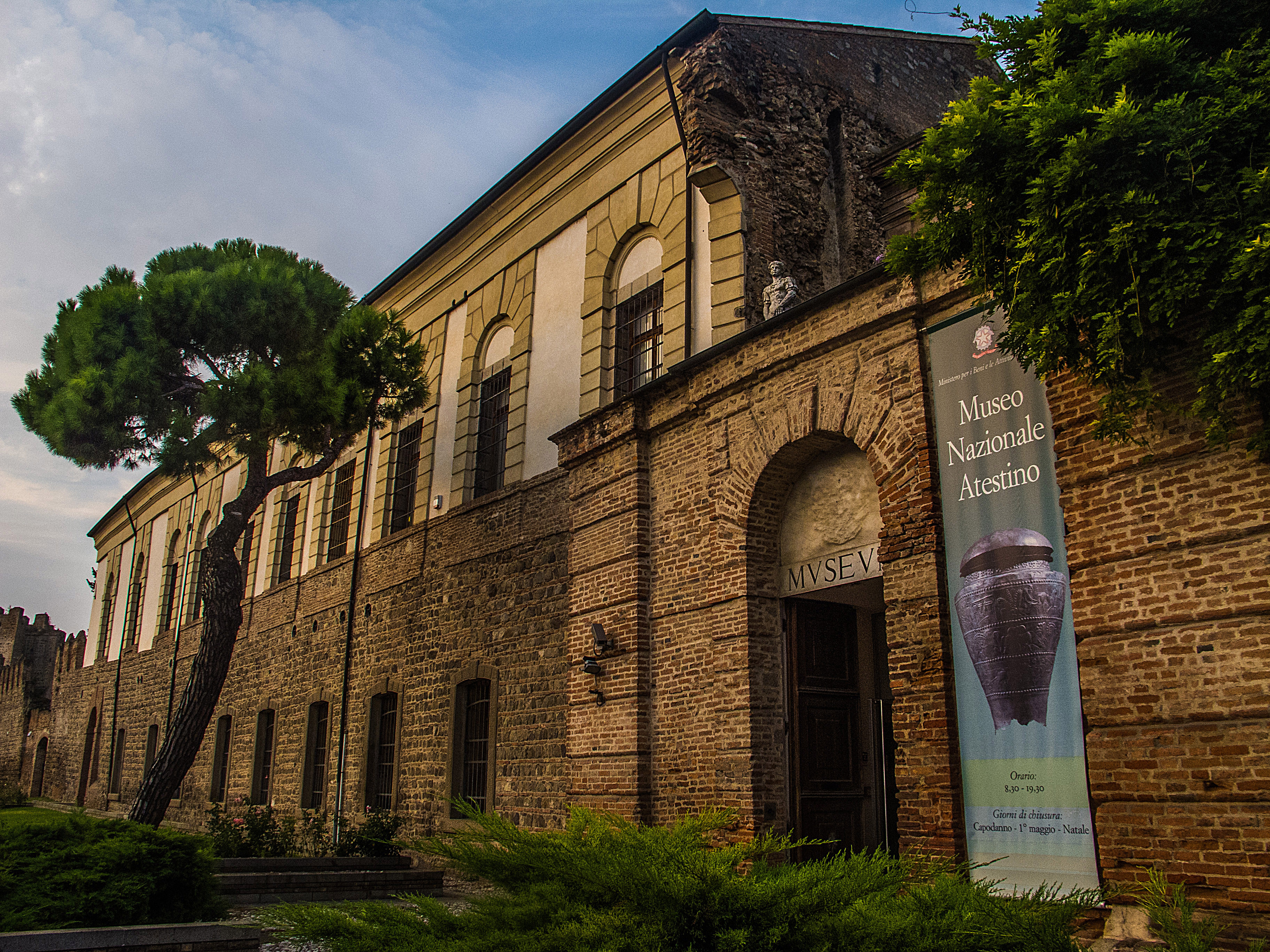
- Location: Este, Italy
- Type: Italian national museum Museum of the Italian Ministry of Culture archaeology museum art museum history museum
- Collection size: 7,000 item, 7,000 item
- Visitors: 6,422 (2020)
- Website: Official website

The Museo Nazionale Atestino is a mainly archeologic museum, displaying pre-Roman and Roman art and artifacts found in and around the town of Este in the province of Padova, region of Veneto, Italy.

Since 1902, the museum has been housed in the Palazzo Mocenigo, a palace erected in the 16th century incorporating into the façade part of the walls of the 14th-century castello dei Carraresi, which in 1056, had served as housing for the House of Este. The 16th-century reconstruction was patronized by the Mocenigo family of Venice. But this palace was generally destroyed in a fire in 1785. Three rooms of the Piano nobile still retain 17th-century frescoes by Giulio Carpioni.

The main collection includes 65,000 items of historical significance, plus designs, and a library.
