= Villa Contarini (Este) =

Villa in Province of Padua, Italy

Coordinates: 45.2306°N 11.6567°E

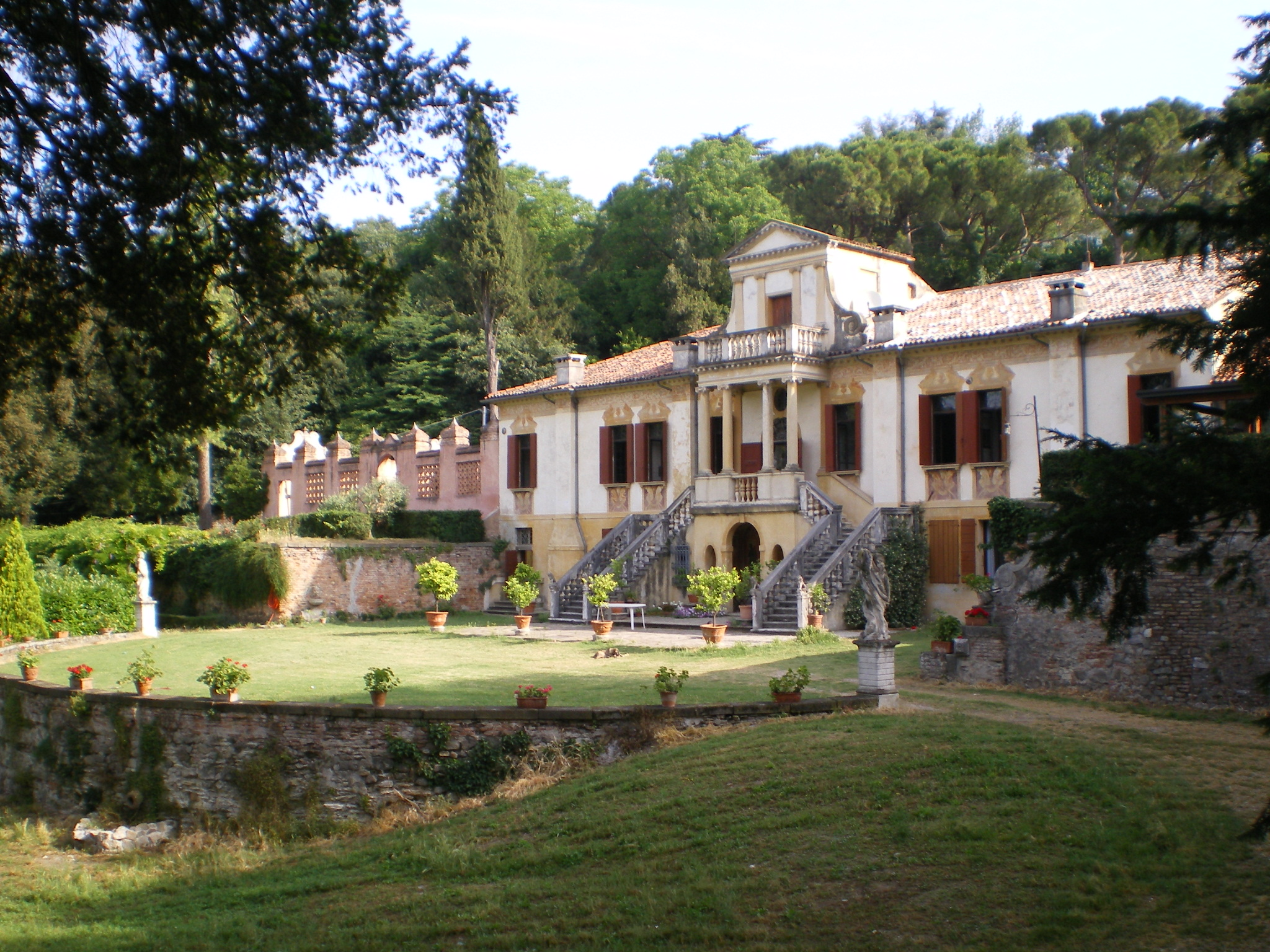
Vigna Contarena

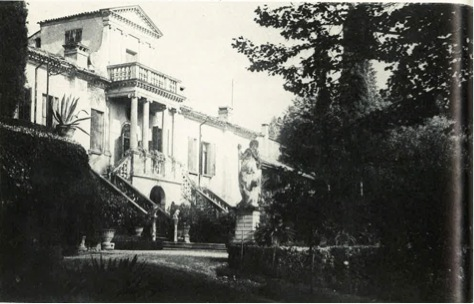
Villa in the 1930s

Villa Contarini, also known as Vigna Contarena, is a villa in Este, Province of Padua, in the Veneto region of northern Italy. The name Vigna Contarena (vigna meaning « vineyard ») seems to come from the fruit trees and vines originally cultivated in the park of the villa, situated at the foot of the Euganean Hills. The villa was built in the first years of the 17th century and served both residential and agricultural purposes, with the ground floor destined for storage and labor uses, while the first floor, or piano nobile, contained the living quarters and formal rooms.

== History ==
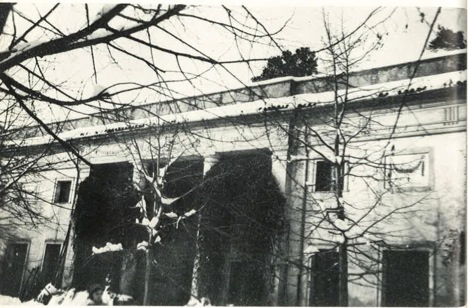
The barchessa in the 1930s

The villa was built at the site of a hunting estate by a Senator of Venice, Giorgio Contarini (1584–1660). He was a member of the prestigious branch of Contarini degli Scrigni. However, because of Giorgio Contarini's young age at that time, it is more likely that the works would have been ordered by his father or his grandfather (it is reasonable to think that the grotesque frescoes of the villa were already present in the original building, since grotesque art dated back to the 15th century). The Contarini were prominent patrons in Este, having also commissioned the construction of the Porta di San Francesco (1595), one of the main city gates.

The main works included the realisation of the large park extending from the property, and the expansion of the western wing, according to Late Renaissance canons. In the 1660s the villa hosted Cardinal Gregorio Barbarigo, during some of his pastoral visits. In the 18th century, a large barchessa or barn was built for farming activities linked to the villa. Despite the Napoleonic occupation of the Veneto, the family Contarini retained Vigna Contarena until 1820–1821, when the villa was sold to the Prussian Count of Haugwitz. After the Count's death, the property passed to several families. Since 1992 Vigna Contarena has been property of Caporali family.

== The frescoes ==
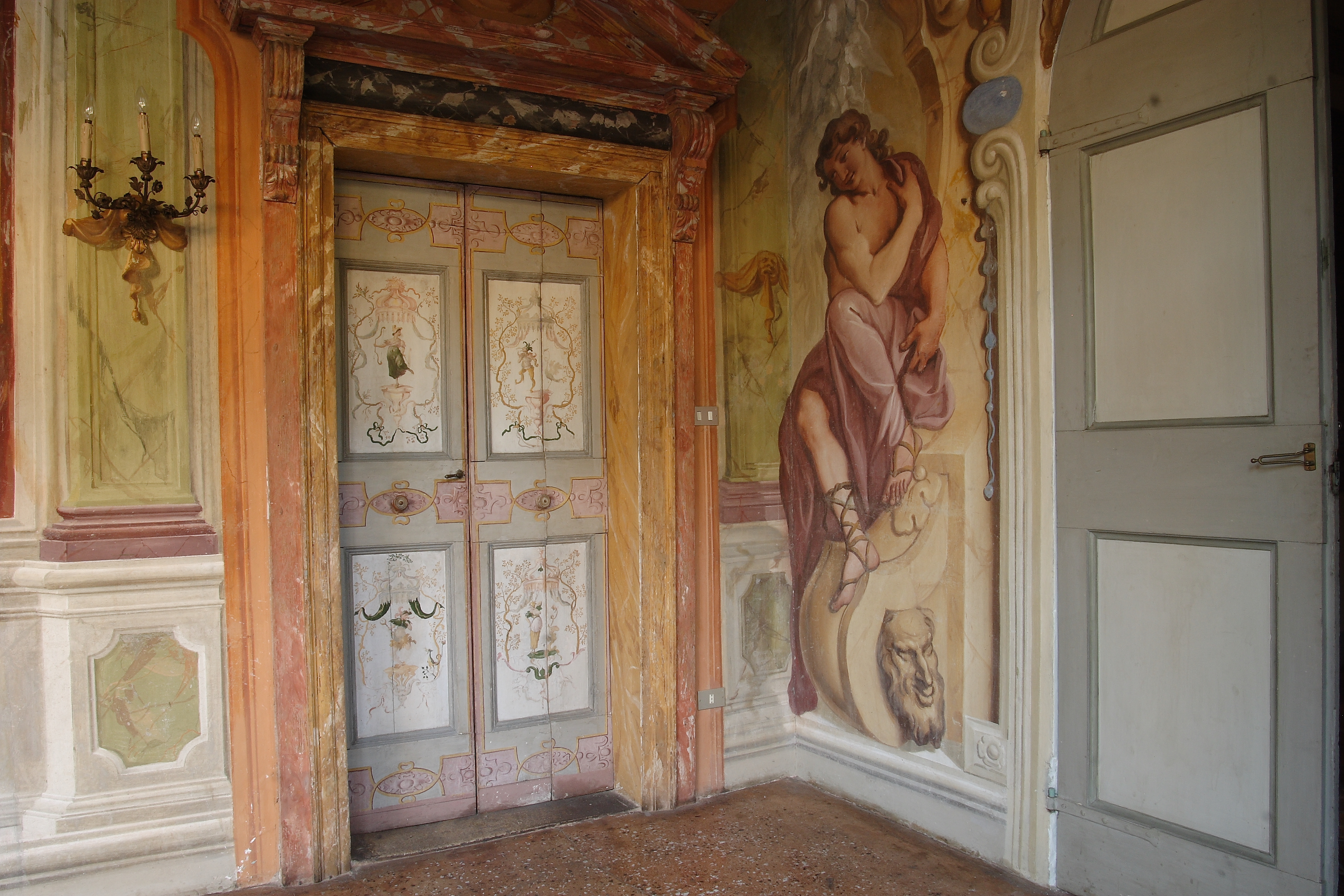
Frescoes in the ballroom

Vigna Contarena has well-preserved 17th-century frescoes in the eastern side of the villa, including the ballroom, in the Stanzette affrescate ("Frescoed chambers") and in the Sala dei Fauni ("Chamber of the Fauns").

The ballroom was an interior loggia originally facing upon the back of the building. The room contains a series of frescoes taking inspiration from Greek mythology. In 1979 the ballroom was subjected to restoration procedures in order to restore the frescoes. The Stanzette Affrescate can boast some unique grotesque decorations representing bucolic scenes on the walls and some astronomical motifs on the ceiling. The Sala dei Fauni consists in a ground-floor portico which is located below the ballroom. It was frescoed by Battista Franco, also known as Semolei (Venice 1498 - 1561) in the mid-1500s and it represents a series of mythological scenes with fauns.

== The gardens ==
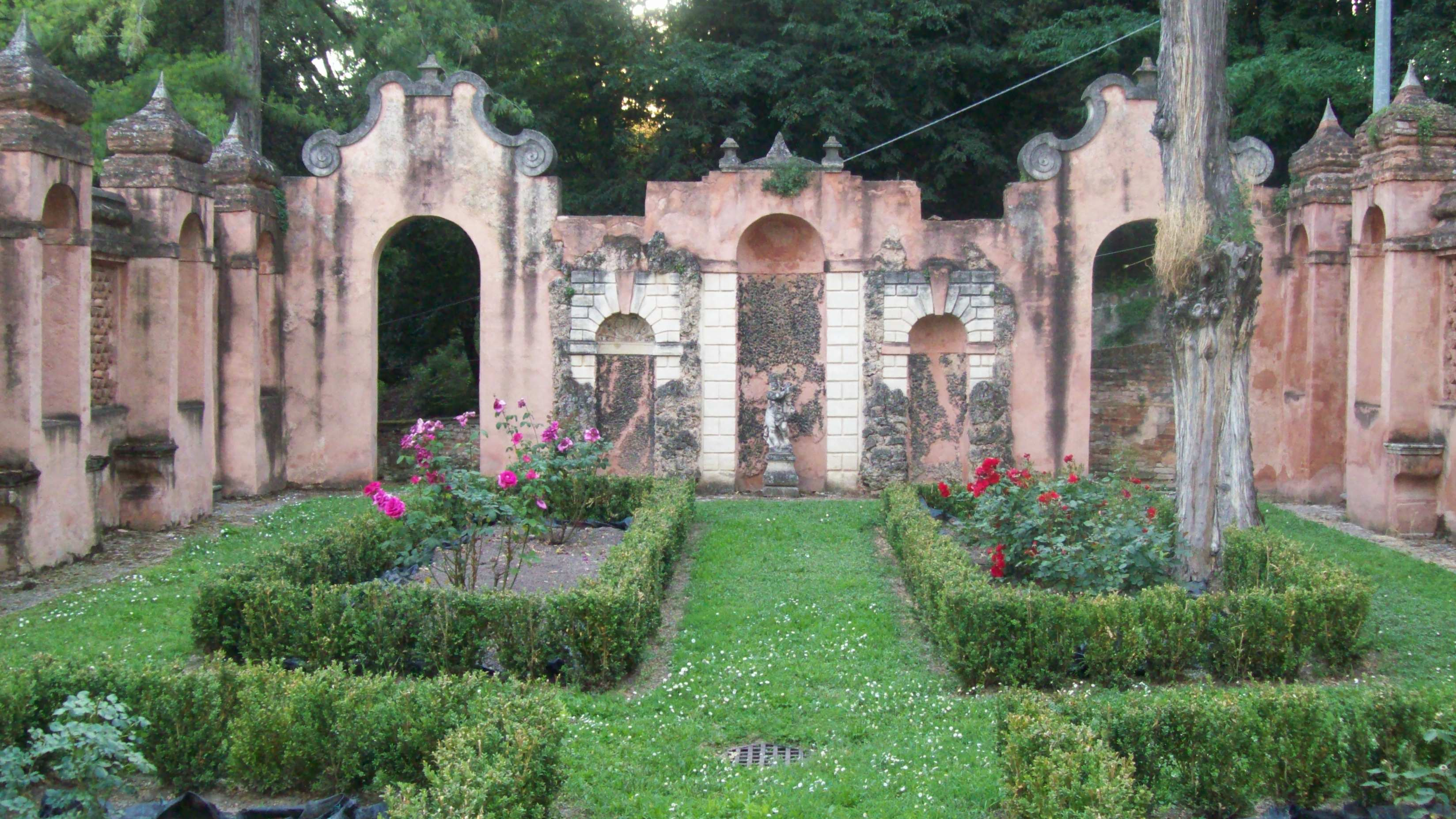
The Hortus conclusus

Beside the western side of the Villa Contarena there is the Enclosed Garden (Hortus conclusus). Its structure follows the symmetrical ideals of Italian Renaissance gardens, while the walls enclosing it follow the typical style of Persian gardens (Fin Garden in Kashan, for example). These kinds of gardens were enclosed in order to protect their rank vegetation from the surrounding desert, but also to materialize, with plants and animals, the concept of Eden.

The park is enclosed on the south and south-east by the walls of the Carrara Castle, while the rest of the park is bounded by Via dei Cappuccini. This big park emphasizes the architecture of the villa, thanks to the atmosphere recreated by its century-old trees. It is also for this reason that Vittorio Cossato, journalist for Il Giorno, described Vigna Contarena as una gemma di eleganza architettonica nel verde castone del parco ("a gem of architecture in a green setting").

== The Count of Haugwitz and the legend ==
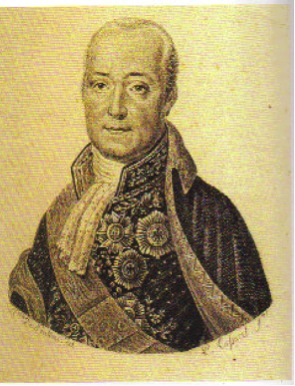
The Count of Haugwitz, known as "The Prussian"

In the park of Vigna Contarena, at the foot of one of the tower of the castle, there is the Count of Haugwitz's grave.

Christian August Heinrich Kurt Graf von Haugwitz was a Prussian minister and diplomat who was held partly responsible for the terrible defeat against Napoleon (1806). He tried to justify his political choices in the book Fragments de mémoires inédits.

Soon afterwards, he decided to retire to Este which was already well known by the intellectual élite of that time and had already hosted poets like Byron and Shelly. During his stay, the Count of Haugwitz – known as "The Prussian" by local people – fell deeply in love with the young Baroness Kunkler, who lived in the homonymous villa not far from Vigna Contarena. Despite his love was clearly unrequited, the Count asked to be buried on the grounds of this villa, standing on his feet, and looking at Villa Kunkler near the villa. When he died, in 1832, his wishes apparently were respected. According to a local legends, on spring nights it is possible to see his ghost wandering on the walls of the castle and sighing for his lost love.

== Sources ==
The Wikipedia page (Italian) Villa Contarini (Este).
