= Albert Azzo I of Milan =

Italian nobleman

Albert Azzo I, Margrave of Milan
- Arms of the Obertenghi
- Born: c. 970
- Died: 1029 (Aged c. 58–59)
- Noble family: Obertenghi
- Spouse: Adelaida
- Issue: Albert Azzo II; Adela of Savona
- Father: Otbert II, Margrave of Milan
- Mother: Railenda

Albert Azzo I (Italian: Alberto Azzo or Adalberto Azzo) (c. 970 – 1029) was an Italian nobleman. He was a member of the Obertenghi (or Adalbertini) family. From 1014 onward, he was margrave of Milan and count of Luni, Genoa and Tortona.

== Life ==
Albert was the son of Oberto II, count palatine of Milan, and Railenda, daughter of Count Riprand, and widow of Sigfred, Count of Seprio.

Albert is attested in documents between 1011 and 1026. On 10 May 1013, he was acting as a missus in Italy. Also in May 1013 Albert is documented with iudiciaria (the right of justice) in Monselice. In 1014, he inherited the counties of Luni, Tortona, Genoa, and Milan on the death of his father, Otbert II, Margrave of Milan. His holdings were extensive and both feudal and allodial. Albert and his brothers Hugh, Adalbert (IV), and Obizzo all carried the title margrave. Their sister Bertha married Arduin of Italy to ally the Anscarid and Obertenga families. Another sister named Bertha married Ulric Manfred II of Turin. Albert himself married Adela of Sabbioneta, daughter of count Bosone of Sabbioneta.

At first, Albert and his brothers supported their brother-in-law Arduin against the Emperor Henry II in the war for the Italian throne. In 1014, he did not oppose Henry's imperial coronation, but after Henry left in May, he sought to aid Arduin. Albert was named as one of Henry II's opponents in an imperial diploma issued in July 1014 at Solingen. The diploma indicates that Albert was among those who supported Arduin, and who had assaulted Pavia, Vercelli, and Novara. In 1019, he reconciled with Henry, but in 1022, all four brothers were captured by Henry's forces and Albert submitted. In Spring 1026, Albert joined Ulric Manfred in defending Pavia from Conrad II.

== Marriage and children ==
With his wife, Adelaida, Albert had two children:

- Albert Azzo II, founder of the House of Este.
- Adela of Milan, who married Anselm II, margrave of Savona (d. before 1055).

== Sources ==
- Ferrabino, Aldo (ed). Dizionario Biografico degli Italiani: I Aaron – Albertucci. Rome, 1960.
- Adalbert Azzo I Markgraf von Mailand (in German)
