= Fulco I of Milan =

Italian nobleman

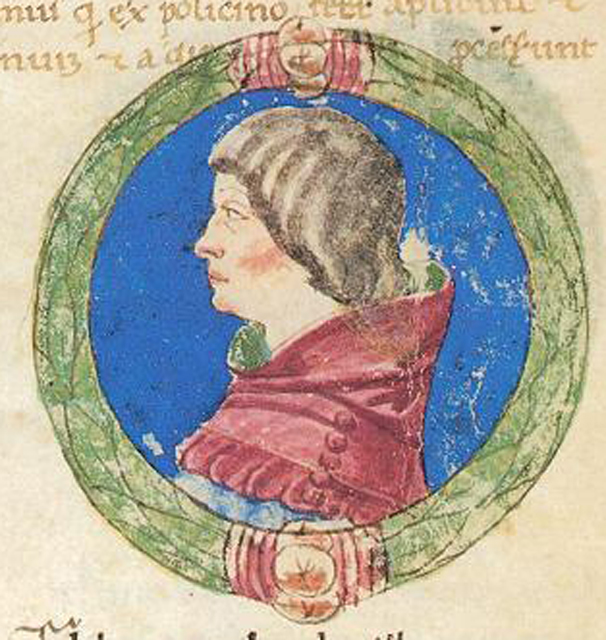
Fulco depicted in the Genealogia dei principi d'Este of the 1470s

Fulco I d'Este (c. 1070 – c. 1134) was the founder of the Italian branch of the House of Este.

== Life ==
He was a son of Albert Azzo II, Margrave of Milan and Garsende of Maine, daughter of Herbert I, Count of Maine. When Albert Azzo II died in 1097, Fulco inherited the family's Italian domains — mainly in Veneto, around Mantua, Padua, Treviso, and Verona — while his elder half-brother Welf received the lands north of the Alps. Welf contested this division and attempted, unsuccessfully, to seize the Italian territories, but the Bavarian branch of the family, the Guelphs, did not formally renounce their claim until the time of Henry the Lion in 1154.

In 1070, Fulco's brother Hugh became Count of Maine, reclaiming their maternal grandfather's lands, which had been under Norman or Angevin control since 1051.

The family took its name from the town of Este in Veneto. Fulco was the first of his line to forge ties with the nobility of Ferrara, which the Este family would come to rule a century later.

== Family ==
Fulco had at least six children, though the order of birth is uncertain:

- Obizzo I d'Este (died 25 December 1193), grandfather of Azzo VI of Este
- Azzo IV d'Este (died before 1145)
- Bonifacio I d'Este (died 1163)
- Fulco II d'Este (died before 1172)
- Alberto (died after 1184)
- Beatrice (dates uncertain; possibly married in 1108 to Alfonso VI of León and Castile, though this identification is disputed)

== Sources ==
- Schneidmüller, Bernd (2000). Die Welfen: Herrschaft und Erinnerung (819-1252) (in German). Verlag W. Kohlhammer.
