= Este, Veneto =

Este
- Comune
- Comune di Este
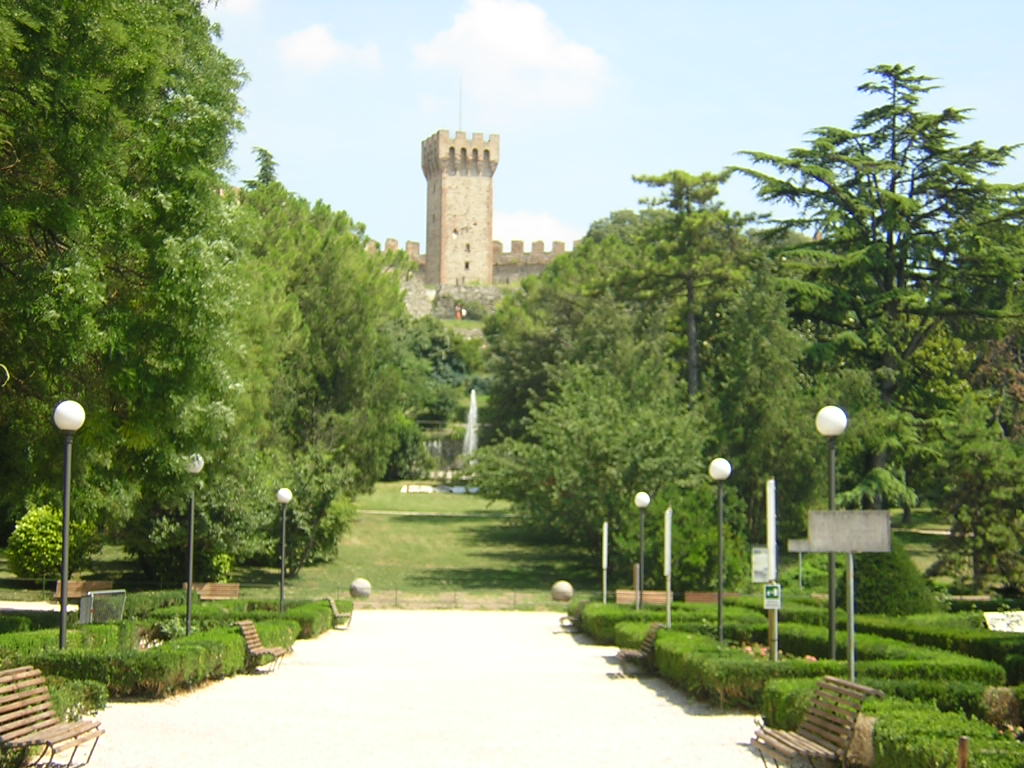
- Este Castle

- Flag Coat of arms

- Location within Italy Location within Veneto
- Coordinates: 45°14′N 11°40′E
- Country: Italy
- Region: Veneto
- Province: Padua (PD)

Government
  - Mayor: Matteo Pajola

Area
  - Total: 32.7 km^{2} (12.6 sq mi)
- Elevation: 15 m (49 ft)

Population (30 November 2021)
  - Total: 15,980
  - Density: 489/km^{2} (1,270/sq mi)
- Demonym(s): Estensi, Atestini (archaic)
- Time zone: UTC+1 (CET)
  - Summer (DST): UTC+2 (CEST)
- Postal code: 35042
- Dialing code: 0429
- Patron saint: St. Tecla
- Website: Official website

Este (Italian: [ˈɛste]) is a town and comune of the Province of Padua, in the Veneto region of northern Italy. It is situated at the foot of the Euganean Hills. The town is a centre for farming, crafts and industry worthy of note.

== History ==
Este lends its name to the Este culture, a proto-historic culture of the late Italian Bronze Age (10th/9th century BC, proto-venetic phase) to the Roman period (1st century BC) and which was located in the present territory of Veneto.

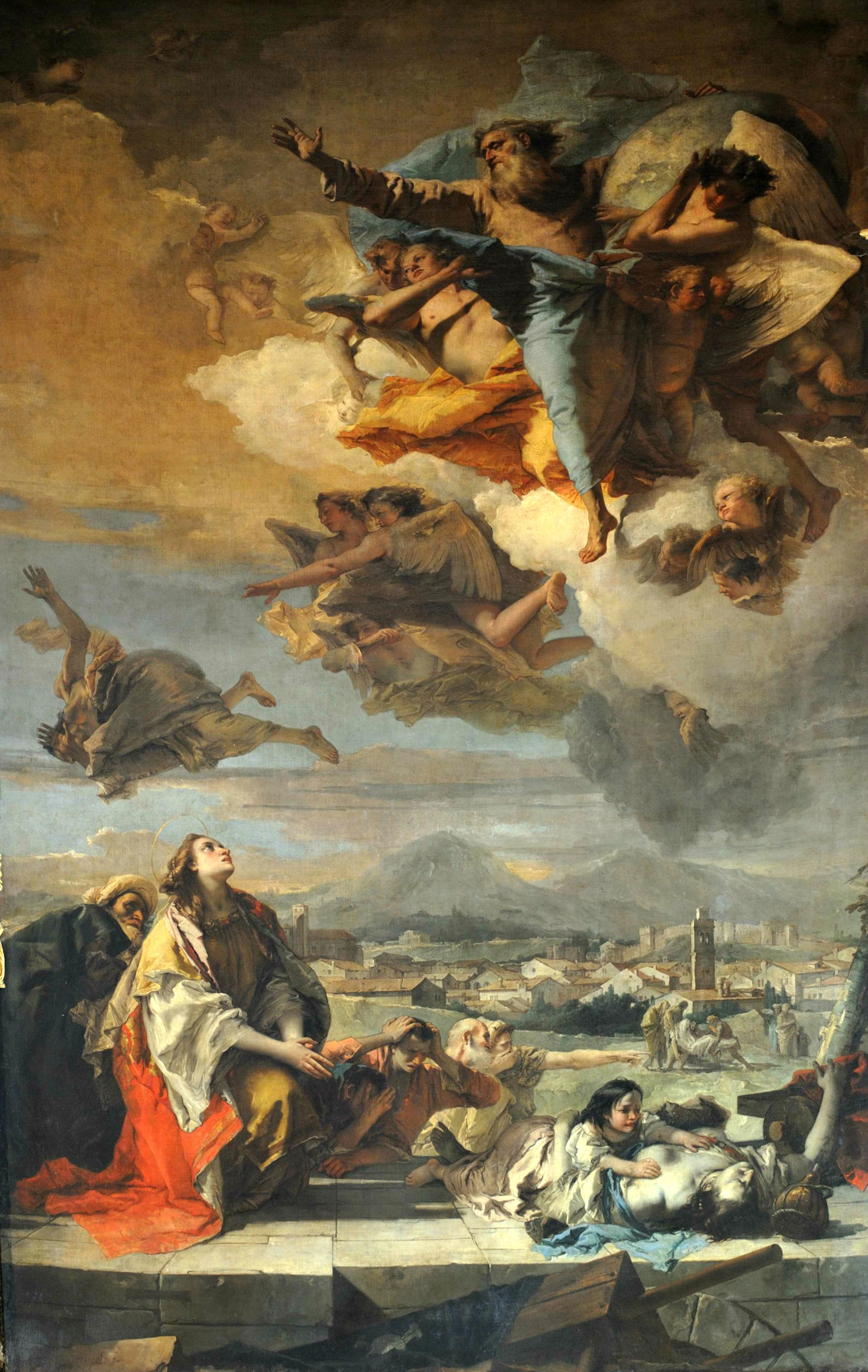
Giovanni Battista Tiepolo, St Thecla Liberating the City of Este from the Plague, 1758–59, in the church of Santa Tecla

During the Iron Age Este was a major center of the Veneti who left a number of inscriptions on funerary and votive objects.

During the late 3rd century BC, Este peacefully fell under the sway of Rome and became a Roman colony under the name of Ateste. When much of Northern Italy was granted Roman citizenship in 49 BC, the citizens of Este were inscribed into the Roman tribe of Romilia. Following the Battle of Actium, Emperor Augustus settled soldiers of the Legio V Alaudae and Legio XI Claudia in the territory of Este comprising Galzignano Terme, Teolo, Lonigo, Noventa Vicentina, Trecenta, Pernumia, Monselice, and Cinto Euganeo.

In Late Antiquity, Este was devastated and reduced to a rural village because of barbarian invasions, especially that of Attila. It arose again only after the 10th century, after the Obertenghi family started ruling on a vast area, including Este, and starting to name themselves House of Este, and when Azzo II d'Este built a castle there and named himself and his family after it, establishing the House of Este. The House of Este would hold the city until 1240, when it moved its capital to Ferrara. Este, meanwhile, was conquered twice by Ezzelino da Romano III, in 1238 and 1249. It was disputed during the 14th century by the Scaligeri, the Carraresi and the Visconti, until it surrendered spontaneously to Venice in 1405.

Under the Republic of Venice, Este went through a period of economic growth, interrupted only by the plague of 1630.

After the fall of the Republic in 1797 and the Napoleonic Wars, the town, with the whole Veneto region, became part of the Austrian Empire, until it was annexed by the Kingdom of Italy as a consequence of the Third Independence War of 1866.

== Main sights ==
- Duomo of Este (Church of Santa Tecla)
- Church of San Martino
- Church of the Salute
- Church of Santa Maria della Grazie
- Museo Nazionale Atestino
- Villa Contarini
- Castello Carrarese

== Twin towns and sister cities ==
Este is twinned with:

- Bad Windsheim, Germany
- Fredericksburg, United States
- Leek, England, United Kingdom
- Pertuis, France
- Rijeka, Croatia
- Tapolca, Hungary

== See also ==
- Ateste, ancient town
- Villa Contarini
