= Ateste =

Ateste (Ancient Greek: Ἀτεστἐ) (modern Este, Italy) was an ancient town of Venetia, at the southern foot of the Euganean hills, 43 feet above sea-level and 22 miles southwest of Patavium (modern Padua). The site was occupied in very early times, as archaeology begun in the late 19th century showed.

== Overview ==
Large cemeteries have been excavated, which show three different periods from the 8th century BCE down to the Roman domination:

- I. Italic cremation burials closely approximating to the Villanova type;
- II. Venetic period, when tombs are constructed of blocks of stone, and situlae (bronze buckets), sometimes elaborately decorated, are often used to contain the funerary urns;
- III. Gallic period (beginning in the 4th century BCE), when tombs are much poorer, ossuaries being of badly baked rough clay, with traces of Gallic influence characteristic of La Tène culture; cremation also continues.

The many important objects found in these excavations are preserved in the local museum.

Inscriptions show that the Venetic language asserted its existence even after Ateste came into the hands of the Romans. When this occurred is not known. Boundary stones of 135 BCE exist, which divide the territory of Ateste from that of Patavium and of Vicetia, showing that the former extended from the middle of the Euganean hills to the Atesis (modern Adige, from which Ateste no doubt took its name, and on which it once stood).

After the battle of Actium, Augustus settled veterans from several of his legions in this territory, Ateste being thenceforth spoken of as a colony (colonia). It appears to have furnished many recruits, especially for the cohortes urbanae, an urban police force created by Augustus. Ateste appears but little in history, though its importance is vouched for by numerous inscriptions, the majority of which belong to the early Empire.
