= Hugh V of Maine =

Count of Maine

- Predecessor: Robert Curthose
- Successor: Elias I, Count of Maine
- Born: c. 1062
- Died: 1131 (aged 68–69)

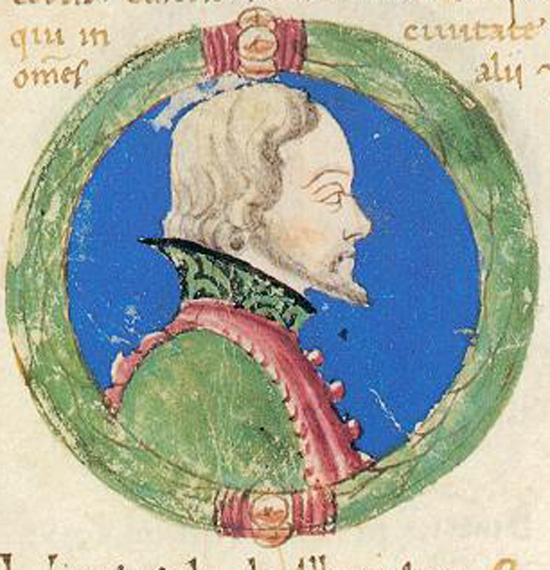

Hugh V was the count of Maine from 1069 until c. 1093.

Hugh was the son of Margrave Albert Azzo II of Milan and Gersenda, a sister of Hugh IV, Count of Maine.

In 1070, the citizens of Le Mans and some of the Manceaux barons revolted against Norman control. After securing the southern border of Normandy and expelling the Normans, they invited young Hugh V to rule them as count of Maine. They soon realized, however, he was incapable of ruling Maine and began to detest him. Orderic Vitalis said of him "he was, indeed, an imbecile, a coward, and an idler, and totally unfit to hold the reins of government in so high a station." After a short time holding the countship, his cousin Elias convinced Hugh to sell him the county, which he did.

In 1077 Hugh married Heria, daughter of Robert Guiscard.

== Sources ==
- Barton, Richard Ewing (2004). Lordship in the County of Maine, C. 890-1160. The Boydell Press.
- Douglas, David C. (1964). William the Conqueror: The Norman Impact Upon England. University of California Press.
