= Albert Azzo II of Milan =

Margrave of Milan (1009–1097)

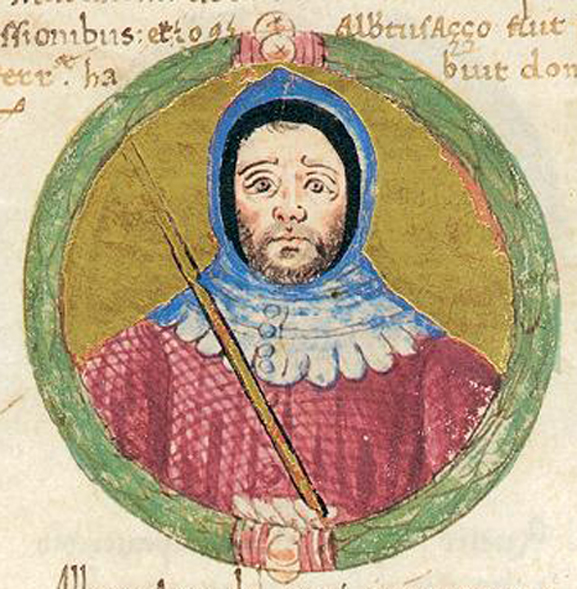
- Alberto Azzo II depicted in the Genealogia dei principi d'Este (1470s)
- Born: 10 July 1009; Modena
- Died: 20 August 1097 (aged 88); Modena
- Noble family: Este (founder)
- Spouses: Kunigunde of Altdorf; Garsende of Maine
- Issue: Welf I Fulco I Hugh V
- Father: Albert Azzo I
- Mother: Adela of Milan

Albert Azzo II (Italian: Alberto Azzo II; J 10 July 1009– 20 August 1097), Margrave of Milan, and Liguria, Count of Gavello, Padua, Rovigo, Lunigiana, Monselice, and Montagnana, was a powerful nobleman in the Holy Roman Empire. He is considered the founder of House of Este, having been head of the first family to be master of Este, a town of Padua.

== Life ==
Albert Azzo II was the only son of Albert Azzo I, Margrave of Milan and Adela of Milan. He inherited his father's offices around 1029, and continually increased his properties in northern Italy. Around 1073 he made a castle at Este his residence, from which the House of Este took its name. Before his building project, Este was little more than a village.

In the Investiture Controversy between Henry IV, Holy Roman Emperor, and Pope Gregory VII, Azzo attempted to mediate, but later he joined the side of the pope.

== First marriage ==
Azzo II married Kunigunde (also called Chuniza), the daughter of Welf II, Count of Altdorf, in 1035/6. Azzo's son with Chuniza, Welf, moved first to Carinthia and then to Bavaria, giving rise to one of the most important families in European history, the Guelphs.

With his first wife, Chuniza, Azzo had:

- Welf (died 6 November 1101, Paphos) Duke of Bavaria from 1070 to 1077 and from 1096 to his death who was the first member of the Welf branch of the House of Este.

== Second marriage ==
Around 1050, Azzo married again, to Garsende, daughter of Herbert I, Count of Maine. In 1069–1070, he tried to acquire Maine for his son Hugh, because his wife, Garsende, was a co-heiress of the previous counts of Maine.

With his second wife, Garsende, Azzo had:

- Fulco I, Margrave of Milan (died 1128), ancestor of the Italian branch of the House of Este made the first documented use of the title "Marquis d'Este."
- Hugh V, Count of Maine (died 1131), was declared count of Maine, but he could not prevail against Robert, the Duke of Normandy.

Some sources say he also married Vitalia Orseolo, daughter of Peter Orseolo. They had a daughter: Itta.

He had an extra-marital affair with, or perhaps married, Matilda, sister of William/Guglielmo, Bishop of Pavia (r.1069-1102/3), with whom he had a daughter named Adelasia, who married Guglielmo Adelardi.

== Death ==
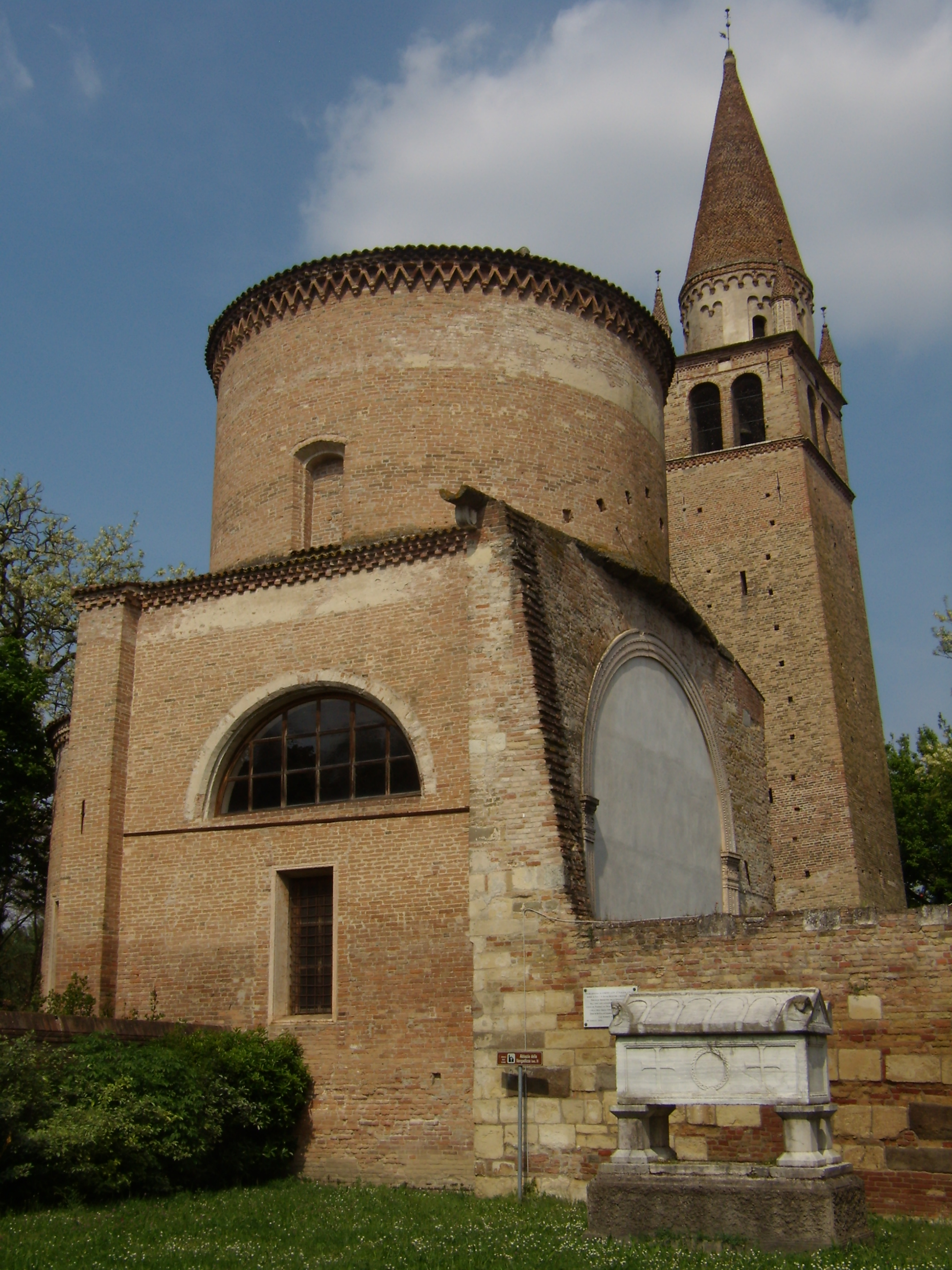
Albert Azzo II's tomb at Vangadizza Abbey

Albert Azzo II lived to the age of 88. He died in August 1097 at the monastery of Vangadizza (Badia Polesine), where he was buried.

== Notes ==
Albert Azzo II of Milan House of Este Born: 997 Died: 20 August 1097
Preceded by Albert Azzo I	Margrave of Milan c. 1029–1097	Succeeded by Fulco I
