= House of Este =

European dynasty of Longobard origin

House of Este Casa d'Este Estensi
- Princely noble family
- Arms of the House of Este (1239–1431)
- Parent family: Obertenghi
- Country: Duchy of Ferrara; Duchy of Modena and Reggio; Republic of Venice; Papal States
- Etymology: From the town of Este
- Founded: 1097; 929 years ago
- Founder: Albert Azzo II (Note: Although the first Marquis of Este was Fulco I's father Albert Azzo II, Fulco is considered the progenitor of the Italian branch of the dynasty, while his brother Welf I the progenitor of the German line (See Younger House of Welf).)
- Final ruler: Ercole III (Modena & Reggio); Maria Beatrice (Massa & Carrara)
- Titles: List: Marquis of Este (1097–1463); Marquis of Ferrara (1208–1471); Duke of Ferrara (1471–1598); Duke of Modena and Reggio (1452–1803); Duke of Massa and Prince of Carrara (1790–1829); Duke of Breisgau (1801–1805)
- Connected families: Malaspina; Pallavicini; Borgia; Farnese; Bourbon-Parma; Welf
- Motto: Ab Insomni Non Custodita Dracone (Unattended by the never-sleeping dragon)
- Heirlooms: Galleria Estense
- Estates: Castello Estense (Ferrara); Ducal Palace (Modena) List: Palazzo dei Diamanti (Ferrara); Palazzo Paradiso (Ferrara); Palazzo Schifanoia (Ferrara); Palazzina Marfisa d'Este (Ferrara); Ducal Palace (Sassuolo); Rocca Estense (St. Felice sul Panaro); Delizia di Belriguardo (Voghiera); Palazzo Estense (Varese); Villa d'Este (Cernobbio); Villa d'Este (Tivoli); Castello del Catajo (Padua); Palais Modena (Vienna)
- Dissolution: 1829; 197 years ago
- Cadet branches: Austria-Este (cognatic, through the female line)
- Branches: Welf (elder branch of Este)

The House of Este (UK: /ˈɛsti/ EST-ee, US: /ˈɛsteɪ/ EST-ay, Italian: [ˈɛste]) is a European dynasty of Longobard origin whose members ruled parts of Italy and Germany for many centuries.

The original House of Este's elder branch, which is known as the House of Welf, included dukes of Bavaria and of Brunswick. This branch produced Britain's Hanoverian monarchs, as well as one Emperor of Russia (Ivan VI) and one Holy Roman Emperor (Otto IV).

The original House of Este's younger branch, which is simply called the House of Este, included rulers of Ferrara (1240–1597), and of Modena (900–1859) and Reggio (1288–1796). This branch's male line became extinct with the death of Ercole III in 1803.

== Origins ==
According to Edward Gibbon, the family originated from the Roman Attii family, which migrated from Rome to Este to defend Italy against the Ostrogoths. However, there is little evidence to support this hypothesis. The names of the early members of the family indicate that a Frankish origin is much more likely. The Encyclopædia Britannica regards this family as a branch of the Obertenghi.

The first known member of the house was Margrave Adalbert of Mainz, known only as the father of Oberto I, Count palatine of Italy, who died around 975. Oberto's grandson, Albert Azzo II, Margrave of Milan (996–1097) built a castle at Este, near Padua, and named himself after the location. He had three sons from two marriages, two of whom became the ancestors of the two branches of the family:

- Welf IV, the eldest (d. 1101), was the son of Kunigunde (d. 1056), the last of the Elder Welfs. He inherited the property of his maternal uncle, Welf, Duke of Carinthia, became duke of Bavaria in 1070, and is the ancestor of the elder branch, the House of Welf.
- Hugh, issue of Azzo's second marriage to Garsend of Maine, inherited the French County of Maine, a legacy of his mother's dowry, but sold it one year later and died without heirs.
- Fulco I, Margrave of Milan (d. about 1128/35), the third son, is the ancestor of the younger Italian line of Este.

The two surviving branches, with Duke Henry the Lion of Saxony and Bavaria on the German (Welf dynasty) side, concluded an agreement in 1154 which allocated the family's Italian possessions to the younger line, the Fulc-Este, who in the course of time acquired Ferrara, Modena and Reggio. Este itself was taken over in 1275 by Padua, and in 1405 (together with Padua) by Venice.

== Elder branch – Younger House of Welf ==
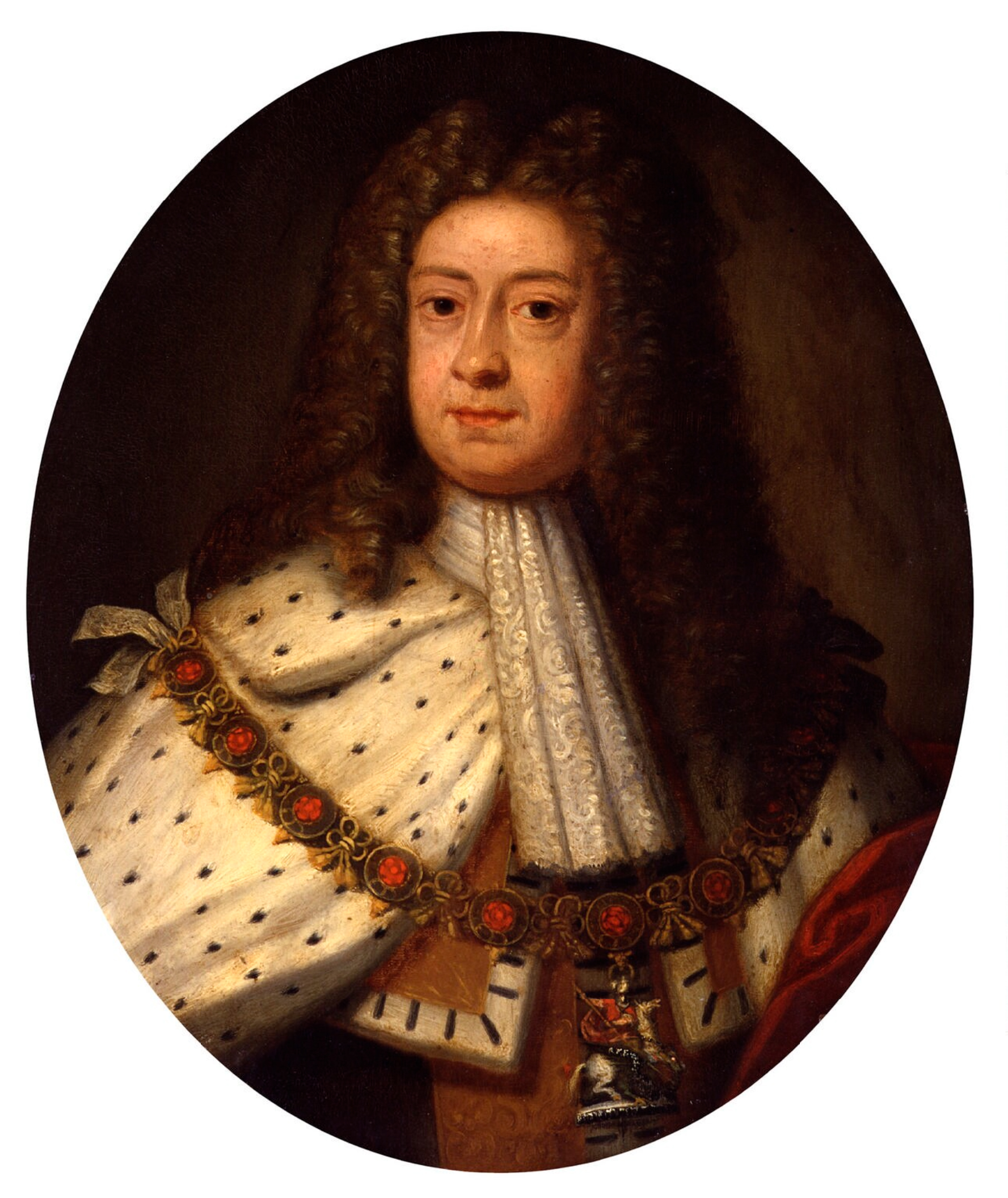
George I, by the Grace of God, of Great Britain, France and Ireland, King, Defender of the Faith, Prince-Elector of Hanover, Duke of Brunswick. Portrait c. 1714, the year of his accession, by Sir Godfrey Kneller.

The elder branch of the original House of Este, known as the House of Welf (were also called Guelfs "Guelf" or "Guelph" which derives from the Italianized name for original "Welf"), produced dukes of Bavaria (1070–1139, 1156–1180), dukes of Saxony (1138–1139, 1142–1180), a Holy Roman Emperor, Otto IV (1198–1218), dukes of Brunswick and Lüneburg (1208–1806), later also dukes of Saxe-Lauenburg (1689–1803), styled the "Electors of Hanover" in 1705, and princes of Brunswick-Wolfenbüttel (1269–1807). The House of Welf gave Great Britain and the United Kingdom the "Hanoverian monarchs" (1714–1901) as well as gave Russia an emperor Ivan VI.

After the peace ending the Napoleonic Wars reshaped Europe, ushering in the modern era, the Electorate of Hanover (duchy of Brunswick and Lüneburg, held in personal union by the king of Great Britain, George III) was dissolved by treaty. Its lands were enlarged and the state was promoted to a kingdom. The new kingdom existed from 1815 to 1866, but upon the accession of Queen Victoria (who could not inherit Hanover under Salic law) in 1837, it passed to her uncle, Ernest Augustus, King of Hanover, and thus ceased to be in personal union with the British Crown.

The senior branch of the House of Welf continued to be ruled by the princes of Brunswick-Wolfenbüttel, as undisputed until the death of the ruling duke of Brunswick Prince William VIII, in 1884. Prior to his death, his brother Charles II from Geneva, as exiled de jure ruler of the house, had declared the Prussian annexation of the crown and the earlier Hanoverian usurpation absolutely illegal acts of usurpation inside of the German House. At his death, his grandson continued internationally recognized appeals. Hanover formed the Guelph Party (or German Party) to continue political appeals against the Prussian and German annexations of the crown.

Arms of Great Britain (1714–1801)

Heraldic achievement

Version for Scotland

== Younger branch – Margraves of Este ==
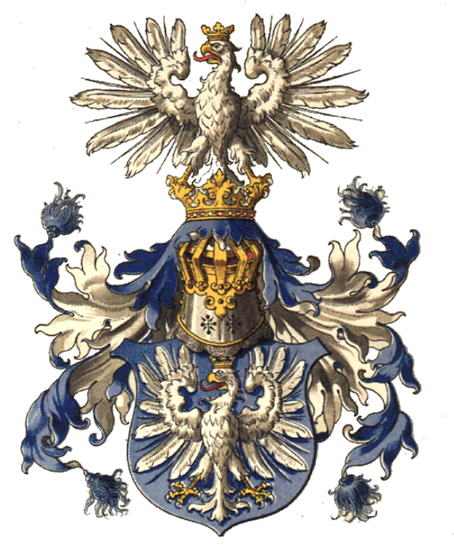
Arms of the House of Este

All later generations of the Italian branch are descendants of Fulco d'Este. From 1171 on, his descendants were titled Margraves of Este.

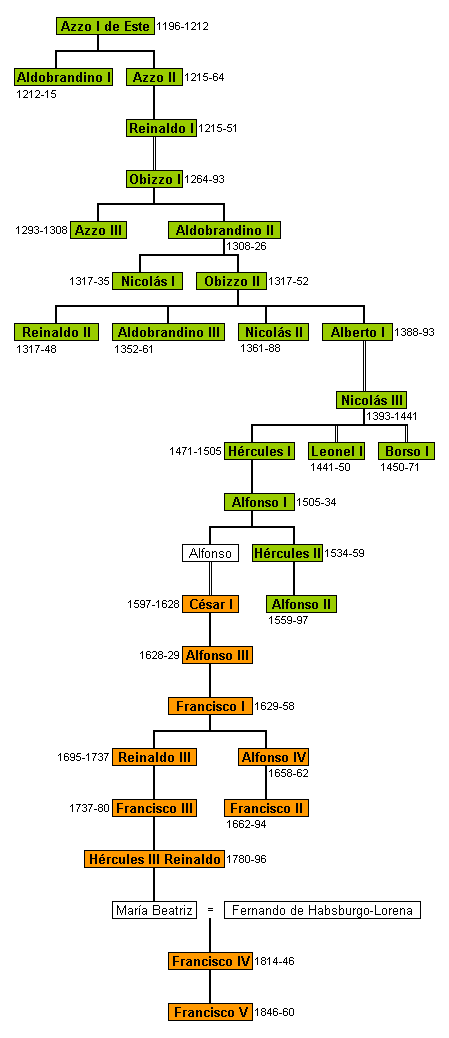
Genalogical Tree of the Este

Obizzo I (d. 1193), the first margrave, battled against Emperor Frederick I Barbarossa. His nephew Azzo d'Este VI (1170–1212) became podestà of Mantua and Verona. As the dowry of his niece the Marchesella, Ferrara passed to Azzo VI d'Este In 1146, with the last of the Adelardi. In 1242 Azzo VII Novello was nominated podestà for his lifetime.

The lordship of Ferrara was made hereditary by Obizzo II (d. 1293), who was proclaimed Lord of Ferrara in 1264, Lord of Modena in 1288, and Lord of Reggio in 1289. Ferrara was a papal fief and the Este family were given the position of hereditary papal vicars in 1332.

Ferrara became a significant center of culture under Niccolò d'Este III (1384–1441), who received several popes with great magnificence, especially Eugene IV. He held a Council in Ferrara in 1438, later known as the Council of Florence.

His successors were his illegitimate sons Leonello (1407–1450) and Borso (1413–1471), who was elevated to Duke of Modena and Reggio by Emperor Frederick III in 1452, receiving these duchies as imperial fiefs. In 1471, he received the duchy of Ferrara as papal fief from Pope Paul II, for which occasion splendid frescoes were executed at Palazzo Schifanoia.

Borso was succeeded by a half-brother, Ercole (1431–1505), who was one of the most significant patrons of the arts in late 15th and early 16th century Italy. Ferrara grew into a cultural center renowned especially for music; Josquin des Prez worked for Duke Ercole, Jacob Obrecht came to Ferrara twice, and Antoine Brumel served as principal musician from 1505. Ercole's daughter Beatrice (1475–1497) married Ludovico Sforza, Duke of Milan; another daughter, Isabella (1474–1539), married Francesco Gonzaga, Marquess of Mantua.

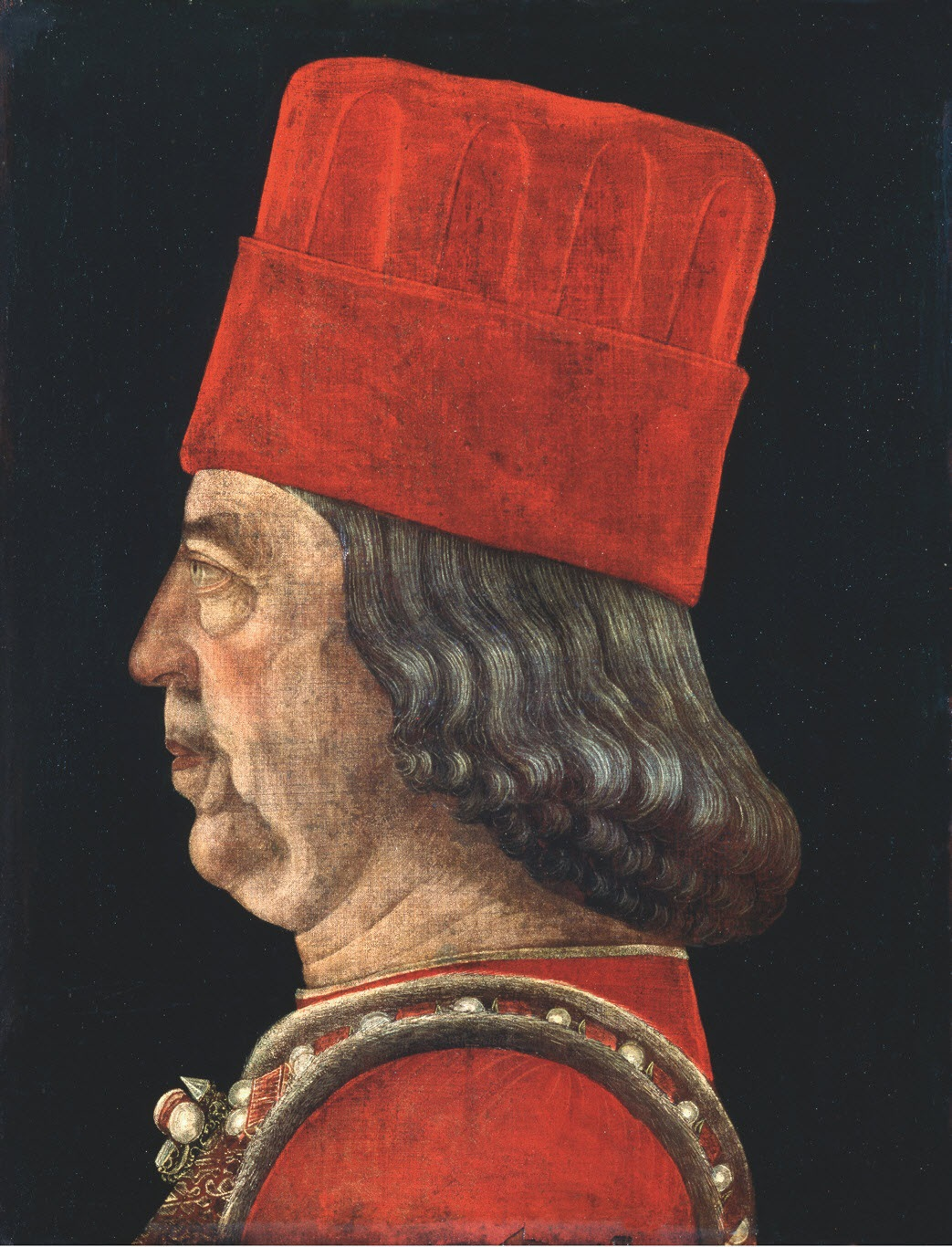
Borso d'Este, the first Duke of Ferrara, Modena and Reggio

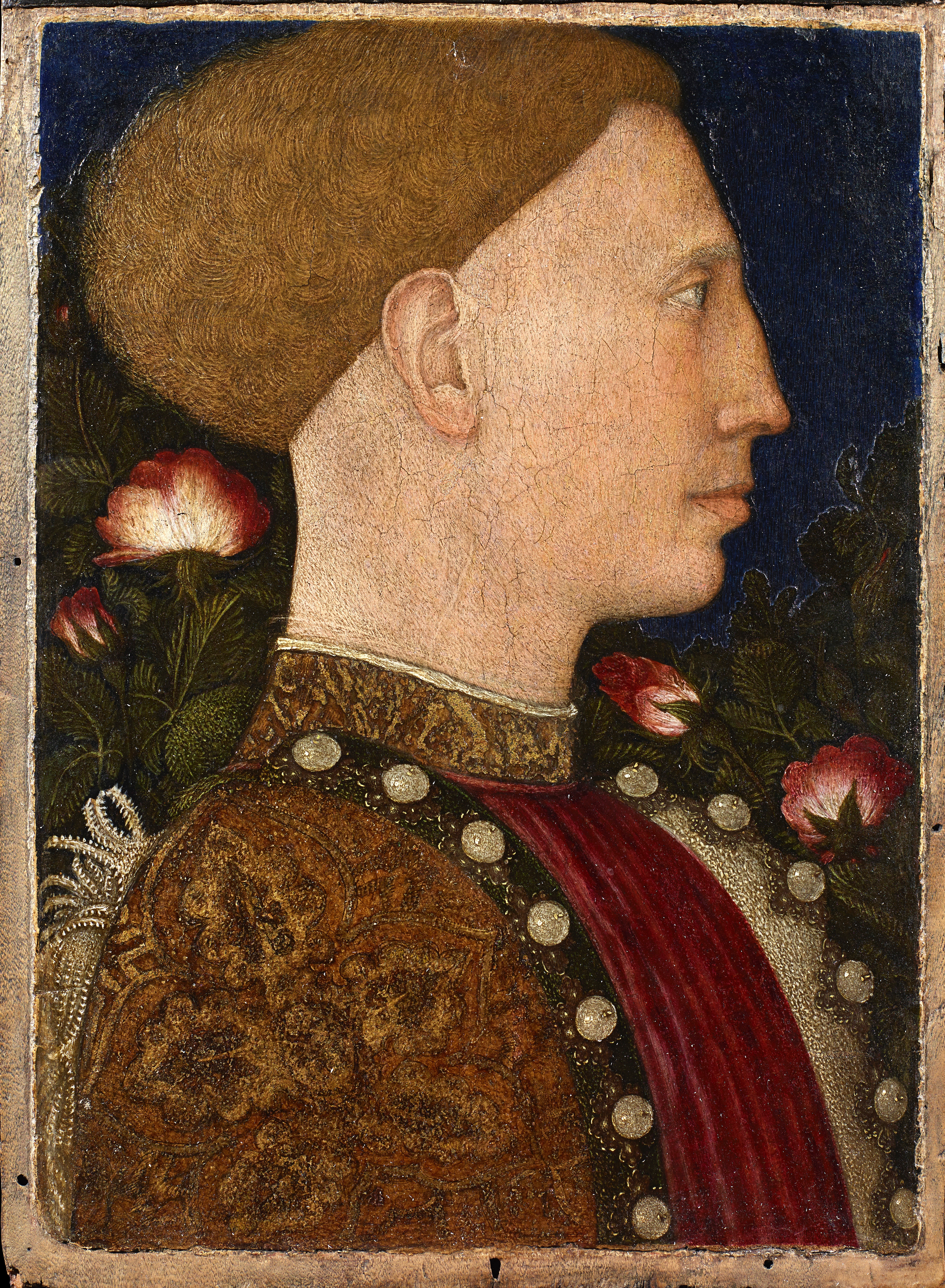
Leonello d'Este, by Pisanello

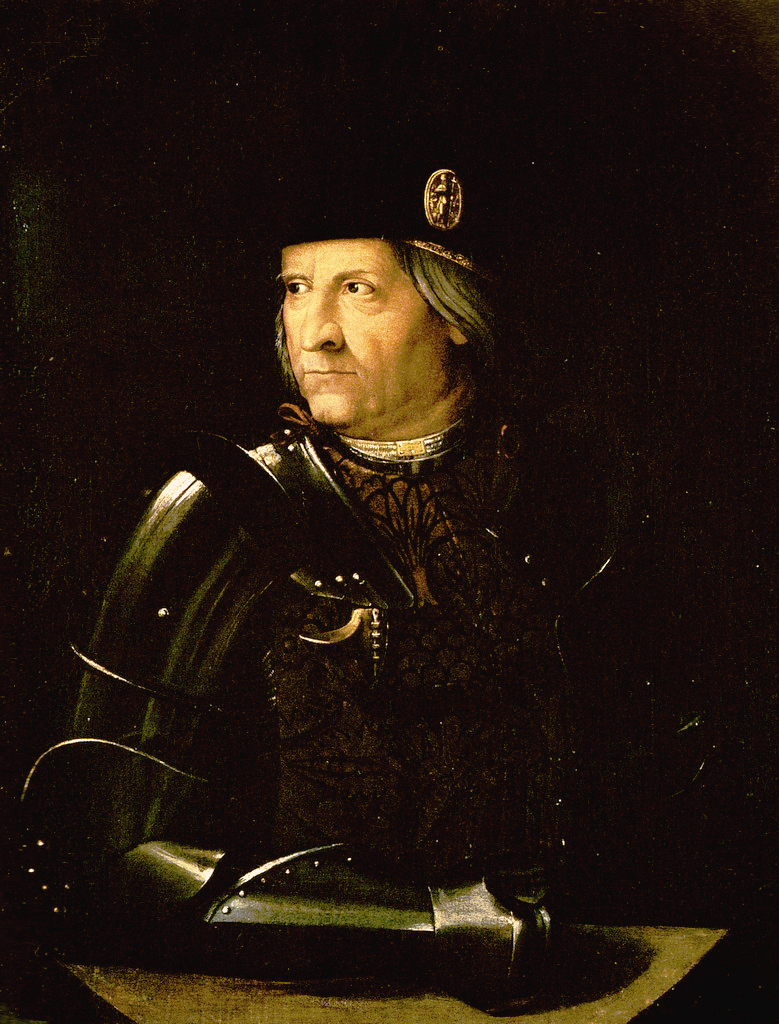
Ercole I d'Este

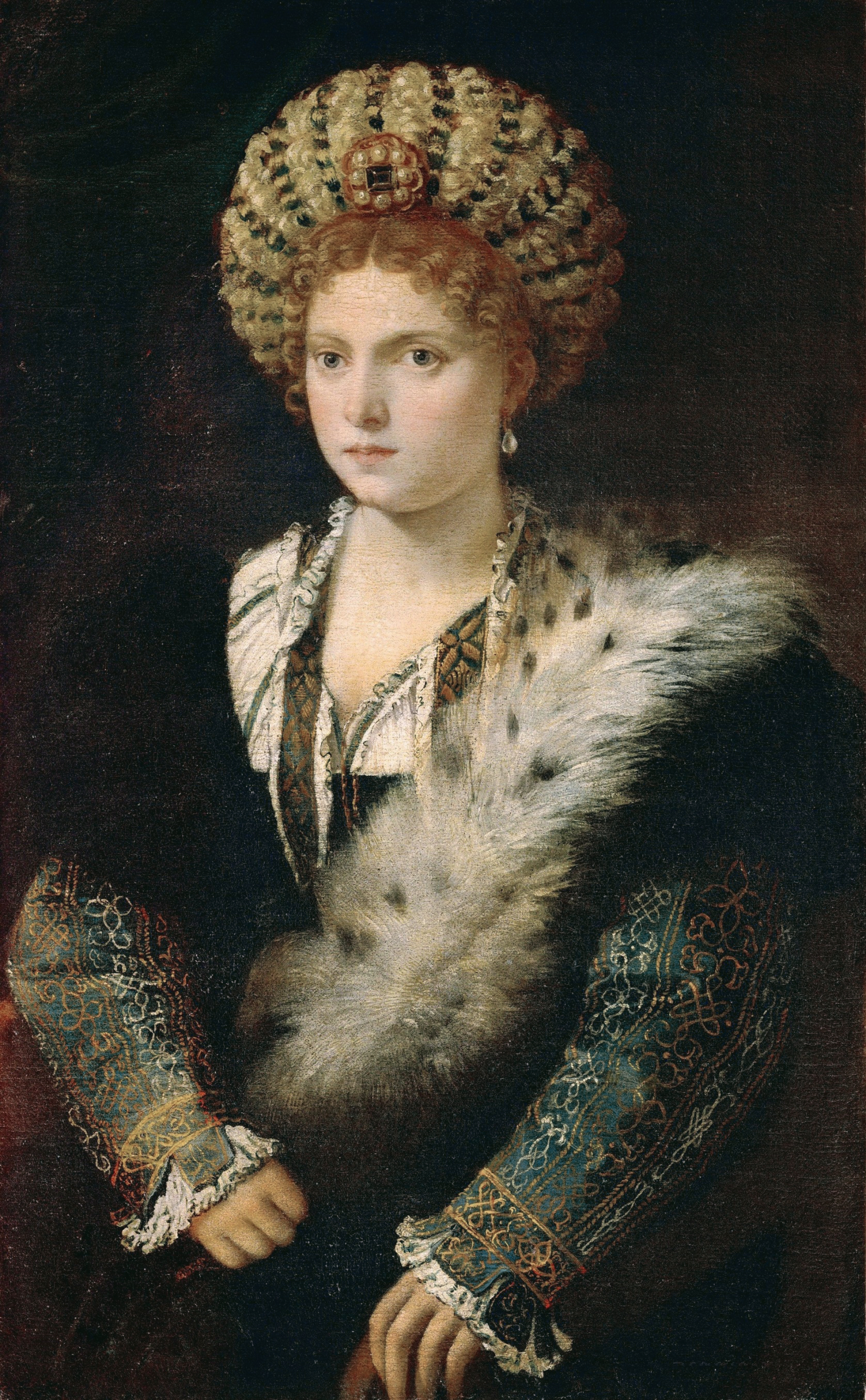
Isabella d'Este, by Titian

Ercole I's successor was his son Alfonso I (1476–1534), third husband of Lucrezia Borgia, daughter of Pope Alexander VI, sister to Cesare Borgia. Alfonso I was a patron of Ariosto.

The son of Alfonso and Lucrezia Borgia, Ercole d'Este II (1508–1559), married Renée of France, daughter of Louis XII of France. His son Alfonso II first married Lucrezia, daughter of grand-duke Cosimo I of Tuscany. After she died, he married Barbara, the sister of Maximilian II, Holy Roman Emperor (1527–1576). His third wife, Margherita Gonzaga, was daughter of the duke of Mantua.

Alfonso II raised the glory of Ferrara to its highest point, continuing the patron of Torquato Tasso and Giovanni Battista Guarini and in general favoring the arts and sciences, as the princes of his house had always done. The legitimate line ended in 1597 with him; as his heir, Emperor Rudolph II recognized his first cousin Cesare d'Este (1533–1628), member of a cadet branch born out of wedlock, who continued to rule in the imperial duchies and carried on the family name. Ferrara, on the other hand, was annexed by force of arms in 1598 by Pope Clement VIII on grounds of the heir's illegitimacy and incorporated into the Papal States.

During the 18th century, the unhappy marriage between the last male heir of the Este family, the future Duke Ercole III, and the sovereign Duchess of Massa and Carrara, Maria Teresa Cybo-Malaspina, produced only one surviving child, Maria Beatrice. However, the Salic law excluded her, as a woman, from the succession to her father, while she was entitled to succeed her mother since the Salic law was derogated in the Duchy of Massa and Carrara by virtue of a 1529 decree of the Emperor Charles V.

When it became obvious that the princely couple would not produce a large offspring, the reigning Duke, Francesco III, set out to prevent Modena from suffering the same fate as Ferrara almost two centuries earlier. Thus, in 1753, two simultaneous treaties (one public and one secret) were concluded between the House of Este and the House of Austria, by which the Archduke Leopold, Empress Maria Theresa's ninth-born child and third son, and Maria Beatrice were engaged, and the former was designated by Francesco III as heir for the imperial investiture as Duke of Modena and Reggio in the event of extinction of the Este male line. In the meantime, Francesco would cover the office of governor of Milan ad interim, which was destined for the archduke.

In 1761, however, following the death of an older brother, Leopold became heir to the throne of the Grand Duchy of Tuscany as provided for the second male heir of the imperial couple, and the treaties had to be revised. In 1763, in spite of the harsh opposition of Maria Beatrice's father, the two families agreed to simply replace the name of Leopold with that of Maria Theresa's fourteenth child, Archduke Ferdinand Karl of Austria, who was four years younger than his betrothed. In January 1771 the Perpetual Diet of Regensburg ratified Ferdinand's future investiture and, in October, Maria Beatrice and he finally got married in Milan, thus giving rise to the new House of Austria-Este.

Ercole III finally ascended the throne in 1780 upon the death of Francesco III, but was deposed in 1796 by the French. His States were transformed into the Cispadane Republic, which one year later was merged into the Cisalpine Republic and then into the Napoleonic Kingdom of Italy. Ercole was compensated with the small principality of Breisgau in southwestern Germany, and when he died in 1803, it passed to his son-in-law, who in 1806 lost it to the enlarged and elevated Grand Duchy of Baden during the Napoleonic reorganization of the western territories of the defunct Holy Roman Empire. In December of that same year, Ferdinand died without ever having had the opportunity to exercise his prerogatives as heir to the Este States.

Maria Beatrice had succeeded her mother as Duchess of Massa and Carrara in 1790, but she too had been deposed by the French invasion in 1796.

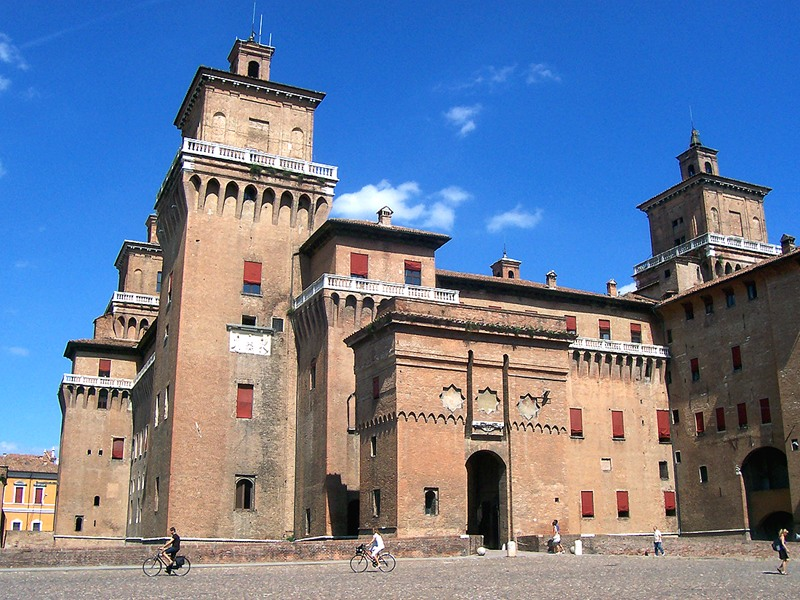
Castello Estense in Ferrara

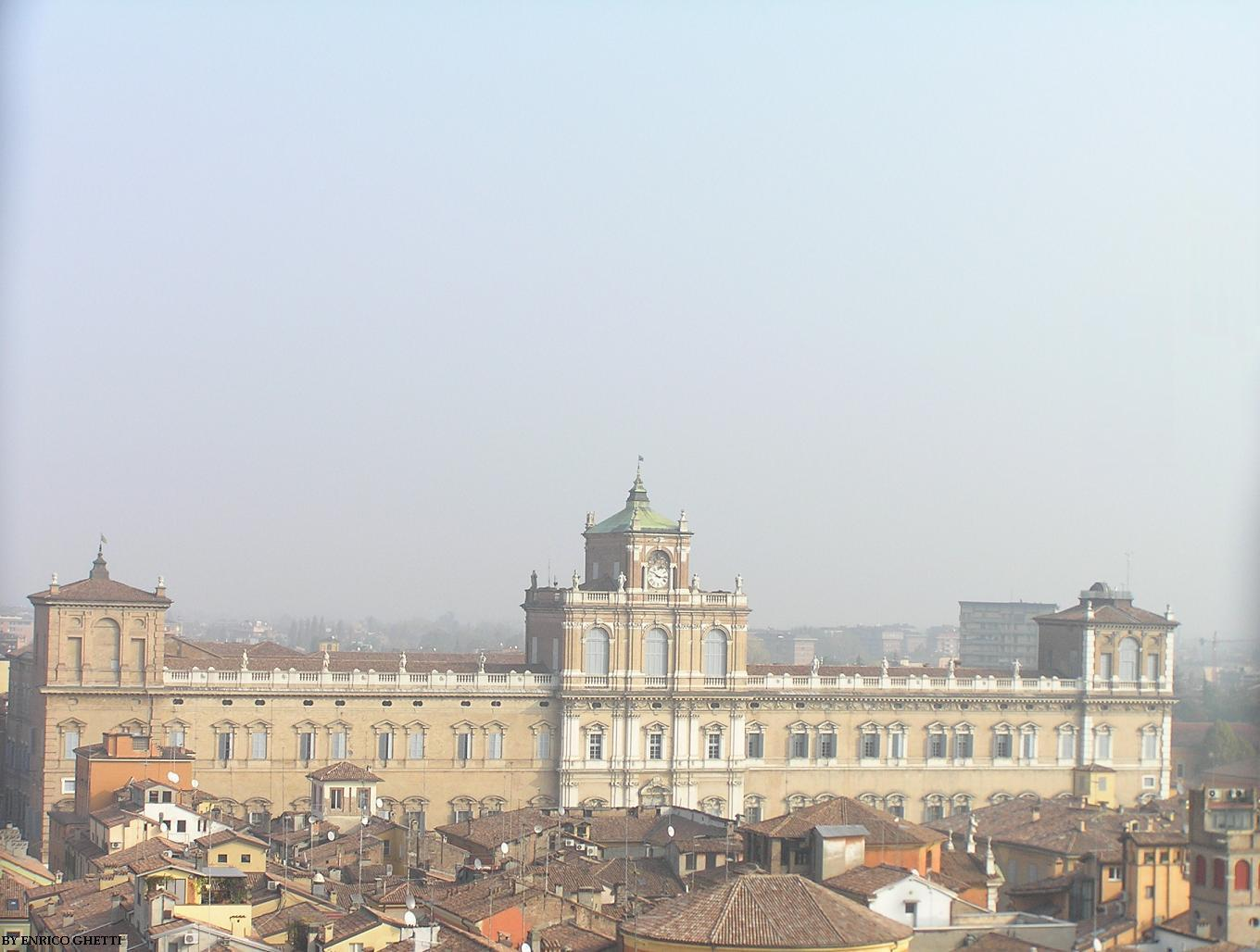
Ducal Palace in Modena, built in 1634 by Francesco I d'Este

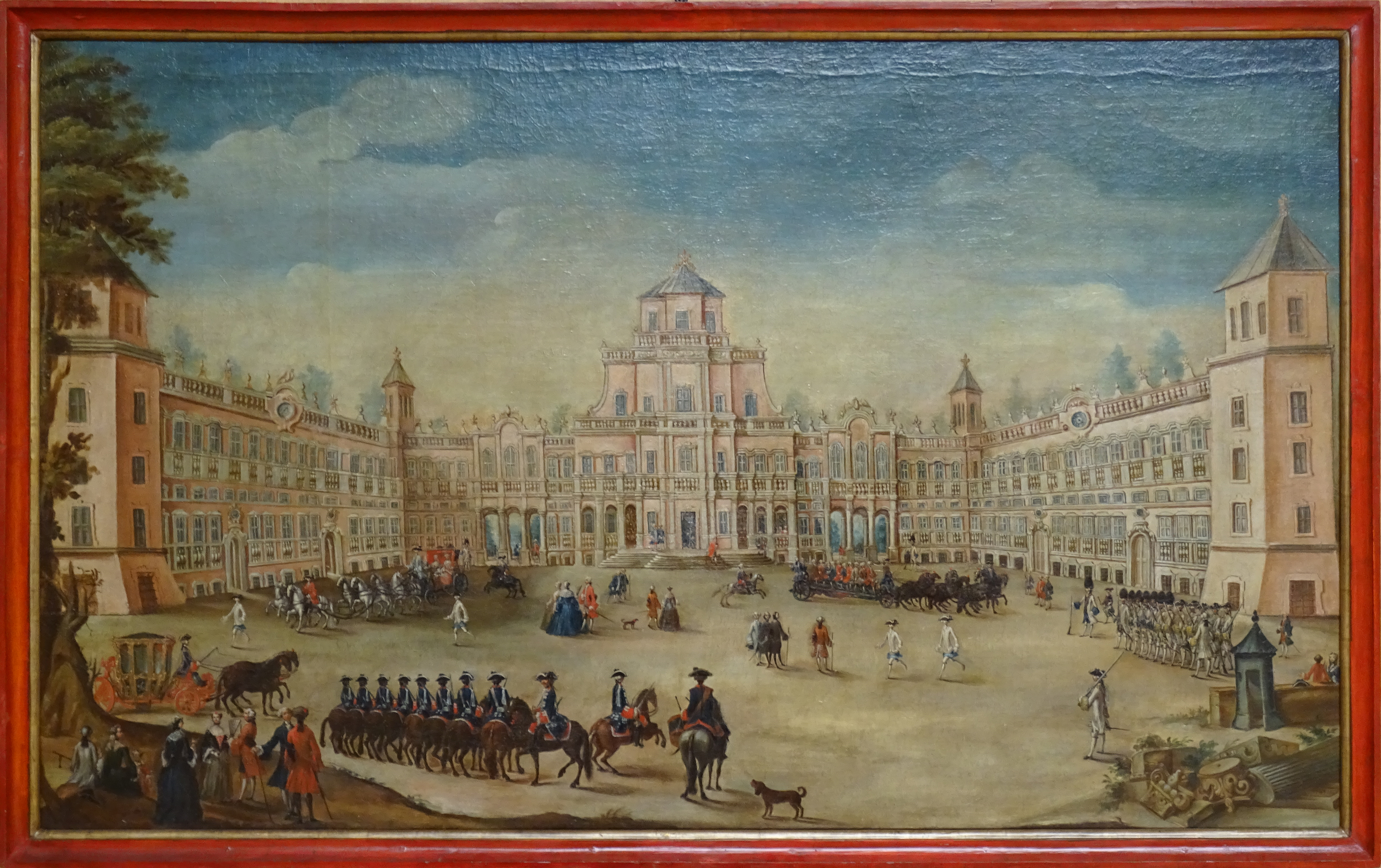
Ducal Palace of Rivalta

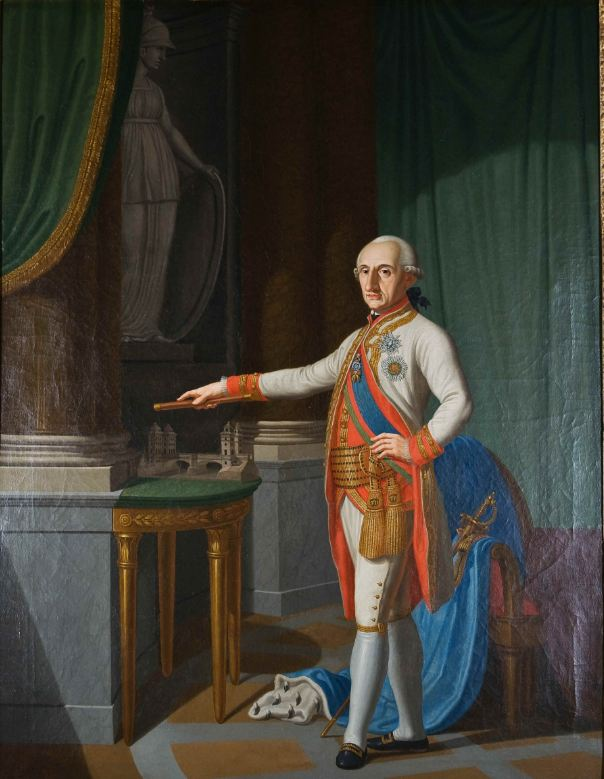
Ercole III was the last Este duke of Modena and Reggio

== Gallery ==
The House of Este held the city Este until 1240, when they moved their capital to Ferrara

Original Coat of Arms of Este 1239–1431

Coat of Arms of Este 1431–1452

Coat of arms of Este 1452–1471

Coat of Arms of Este in 1471

Coat of Arms of Este 1471–1535

Coat of Arms of Este 1535–1741

Coat of Arms of Este in 1741

Coat of Arms of Austria-Este

Arms of Austria-Este as borne by Archduke Franz Ferdinand

== See also ==
- Orlando furioso, epic poem composed in honor of the House of Este
  - Bradamante and Ruggiero, legendary ancestors of the House of Este
- Duchy of Ferrara
- Duchy of Reggio
- Duchy of Modena and Reggio
- Duchy of Massa and Carrara
- Galleria Estense
- Ivan VI of Russia
- Duke of Ferrara and of Modena
- List of members of the House of Este
- Ottobon Terzi
