= Chronological list of saints and blesseds in the 13th century =

A list of people, who died during the 13th century, who have received recognition as Blessed (through beatification) or Saint within a Christian church.

Name	Birth	Birthplace	Death	Place of death	Notes
Blessed Fulco of Neuilly			1201		
Ludan (Ludain, Luden)		Scotland	1202	Scherkirchen, France	
William of Eskhill	1125	Paris, France	1203	Denmark	
Isfrid of Ratzeburg			1204	Ratzeburg, Schleswig-Holstein	
Obitius	1150	Brescia, Italy	1204		
Blessed Jane of Aza			1205		
Blessed William of Fenoli			1205		
Artaldus (Arthaud)	1101	Sothonod, Savoy, France	1206	Lochieu, France	Bishop of Belley
Bona of Pisa	1156	Pisa, Italy	1207	Pisa, Italy	Virgin
Blessed Diego De Avezedo			1207		Bishop of Osma
Blessed Gerard of Villamagna			1207		
Julian	1127	Burgos, Spain	1208	Cuenca, Spain	Bishop of Cuenca
Blessed Peter of Castelnau			1208		
William of Bourges	1140	Nevers, France	1209	Bourges, France	Archbishop of Bourges
Blessed Adam of Loccum			1210		
Blessed Alpais			1211		
Felix of Valois	1127	Valois, France	1212	Brumetz, Picardy, France	
Blessed Charles de Sayn			1212		
John of Matha	1154	Faucon-de-Barcelonnette, France	1213	Rome, Italy	
Blessed Mary of Oignies	1180		1213		
Albert	1150	Parma, Italy	1215		Patriarch of Jerusalem
Blessed Hroznata	1160		1217		
Franca Visalta	1170	Piacenza, Italy	1218	Pittoli, Italy	
Blessed Robert of Knaresborough	1160		1218		
Aldebrandus (Hildebrand)	1119	Sorrivoli, Italy	1219	Fossombrone, Italy	Bishop of Fossombrone
Berard and Companions		Carbio, Umbria, Italy	1220	Morocco	
Blessed Reginald	1183		1220		
Blessed Walter of Bierbeeke			1220		
Abraham of Smolensk		Smolensk, Russia	1221	Smolensk, Russia	
Daniel and Companions			1221	Ceuta, Then Morocco, present-day Spain	
Dominic, priest, founder of the Dominican Order of Preachers	1170	Calaruega, Castile and León, Spain	1221	Bologna, Italy	
Adolph			1222		
Vincent Kadlubek (Vincent of Cracow)	1161	Karwów, Poland	1223	Jędrzejów, Poland	Bishop of Cracow
Adolf	1185	Westphalia, Germany	1224	Osnabrück, Germany	Bishop of Osnabruck
Gualterius	1184		1224		
Angelo of Jerusalem	1185	Jerusalem, Israel	1225	Licata, Sicily	
Engelbert	1185	Burg an der Wupper, Germany	1225	Gevelsberg, Germany	Archbishop of Cologne
Raynald	1150	Postignano, Nocera, Italy	1225	Nocera, Italy	Bishop of Nocera
Blessed Margaret of Louvain	1207		1225		
Francis of Assisi, founder of Franciscan Orders and Poor Clares	1181	Assisi, Umbria, Italy	1226	Portiuncula, Italy	
Ita			1226		
Blessed Beatrice of Este	1206		1226		aunt of St Beatrix d'Este
Blessed Louis of Thuringia	1200		1227		
Blessed Yvette of Huy (Juta)	1158		1228		
Fulk of Pavia (Fulco)	1164	Piacenza, Italy	1229		Bishop of Pavia
Sancha of Portugal	1182		1229	Celas, Portugal	
Hugh of Genoa	1168		1230		
Blessed Bertrand of Garrigues			1230		
Anthony of Padua	1195	Lisbon, Portugal	1231	Padua, Italy	
Brocard (Burchard)		France	1231		
Elizabeth of Hungary	1207	Bratislava, Slovakia	1231	Hesse, Germany	
John of Perugia and Peter of Sassoferrato			1231	Valencia, Spain	
Blessed Benvenuto of Gubbio			1232		
Blessed Pellegrino			1232		
William Pinchon	1175	Saint-Alban, France	1234		Bishop of Saint-Brieuc
Conon	1139	Naso, Sicily, Italy	1236	Naso, Sicily, Italy	
Blessed Agnellus of Pisa	1194		1236		
Blessed Philippa Mareri	1200		1236		
Blessed Diana degli Andalò	1201		1236		
Blessed Rizzerio (Rinieri)			1236		
Sava	1174		1237	Tarnovgrad, Bulgaria	Bishop of the Serbs
Villanus		Gubbio, Italy	1237		Bishop of Gubbio
Blessed Jordan of Saxony			1237		
Blessed Rainerius Inclusus			1237		
Blessed William of Brussels			1237		
Albert of Genoa (Lambert)		Genoa, Italy	1239		
Paul, religious and martyr, and Ninety Companions		Hungary	1240	Wallachia, Hungary	
Raymond Nonnatus	1204	La Portella, Kingdom of Aragon	1240	Cardona, Kingdom of Aragon	
Blessed Ambrose de Massa			1240		
Blessed Peregrine of Falerone			1240		
Blessed Serapion			1240		
Blessed Herman Joseph	1150		1241		
Edmund Rich	1180	Abingdon, England	1242	Soisy-Bouy, France	Archbishop of Canterbury
Peter Rodriguez and 6 Companions		Spain	1242		
Verdiana	1182	Castelfiorentino, Italy	1242	Castelfiorentino, Italy	Virgin
Blessed Ceslaus of Poland	1180		1242		
Blessed Helen of Arcella	1208		1242		
Blessed John of Salerno	1190		1242		
Blessed William Arnaud and companions			1242		
Bernard Calvo	1180	Monso Calvo, Spain	1243	Vic, Spain	Bishop of Vich
Hedwig	1174	Andechs, Bavaria	1243	Trzebnica, Poland	
Blessed Lawrence Loricatus			1243		
Blessed Guala of Bergamo	1180		1244		
Blessed Isnard of Chiampo (Isnardo)	1200		1244		
Blessed Gerard of Villamagna	1200		1245		
Blessed Guy (Guido) Vignotelli (Guido of Cortona)	1185		1245		
Lutgarde	1182	Tongeren, Belgium	1246	Awirs, Belgium	
Peter Gonzalez (Thelmo)	1190	Astorga, Spain	1246	Tui, Spain	
Theobald of Marly		Marly-la-Ville, France	1247	Vaux-de-Cernay, France	
Thibaut			1247		
Blessed John Buoni	1168		1249		
Contardo "the Pilgrim"			1249		
Aleydis of Schaerbeek (Alice, Adelaide)	1204	Schaerbeek, Belgium	1250		Virgin
Amata of Assisi		Assisi, Italy	1250		
Dominguito del Val		Zaragoza, Aragon, Spain	1250	Zaragoza, Aragon, Spain	
Ludolph (Ludolf)			1250		Bishop of Ratzeburg
Teresa of Portugal	1181	Coimbra, Portugal	1250	Lorvão, Portugal	
Walter			1250		
Blessed Alrad			1250		
Blessed Peter of Gubbio			1250		
Blesseds Evangelist and Peregrine			1250		
Gerold of Cologne	1201	Cologne, Germany	1251	Cremona, Italy	
Rose of Viterbo	1234	Viterbo, Italy	1251	Viterbo, Italy	Virgin
Ferdinand III of Castile	1198	Zamora, Spain	1252	Sevilla, Spain	
Mafalda (Matilda)	1204		1252	Amarante, Portugal	
Peter of Verona (Peter Martyr)	1205	Verona, Italy	1252	near Milan, Italy	
Zdislava Berka	1220	Křižanov, Czech Republic	1252	Lemberk Castle, Czech Republic	
Agnes of Assisi	1198	Assisi, Italy	1253	Assisi, Italy	
Clare of Assisi	1194	Assisi, Italy	1253	Assisi, Italy	Virgin
Fina (Serafina, Seraphina)	1238	San Gimignano, Italy	1253	San Gimignano, Italy	Virgin
Richard Wyche	1197	Droitwich, England	1253	Dover, England	Bishop of Chichester
Rodobald			1254		Bishop of Pavia
Blessed Andrew of Spello			1254		
Blessed Arnaldo Canati			1255		
Blessed Godfrey II (Geoffroy de Loudun)			1255		bishop of Le Mans
Peter Nolasco	1189	Mas-des-Saintes-Puelles, France	1256	Valencia, Spain	
Blessed Berengarius de Peralta			1256		
Hyacinth of Poland	1187	Kamień, Poland	1257	Kraków, Poland	
Blessed Thomas of Biville	1187		1257		
Juliana of Mount Cornillon	1192-93	Retinne, Belgium	1258	Fosses-la-Ville, Belgium	Virgin
Blessed Gualterius of Guimaraes			1258		
Blessed Liberatus of Lauro			1258		
Blessed Bronislava			1259		
Blessed Gonçalo de Amarante	1187		1259		
Boniface	1183	Brussels, Belgium	1260	La Cambre Abbey, Brussels, Belgium	Bishop of Lausanne
Jutta (Judith)	1200	Sangerhausen, Germany	1260	Chełmża, Poland	
Blessed Luchesio			1260		
Blessed Sadoc O.P., and companions			1260		
Blessed Philip Berruyer			1261		
Blessed Romeo de Levia			1261		
Blessed Beatrix d'Este		Apulia	1262		niece of Blessed Beatrice d'Este
Blessed Giles of Assisi			1262		
Blessed Eva of Liege			1263		
Blessed Amatus Ronconi	1200		1264		
Blessed John of Thorn (John Lobedau)			1264		
Simon Stock	1165	Aylesford, England	1265	Bordeaux, France	
Blessed Eva of Saint Martin			1265		
Blessed Nicholas Puglia	1197		1265		
Parisio	1160		1267	Treviso, Italy	
Silvester Gizzolino	1177	Osimo, Italy	1267		
Blessed Antony Manzi the Pilgrim			1267		
Blessed Salomea	1201		1268		
Almus (Alme, Alanus)		Scotland	1270	Scotland	
Louis IX	1226	Poissy, France	1270	Tunis, Tunisia	
Margaret of Hungary	1242	Klis, Croatia	1270	Margaret Island, Hungary	
Blessed Amata			1270		
Blessed Bartholomew of Vicenza			1270		
Blessed Boniface of Savoy			1270		Archbishop of Canterbury
Blessed Imana de Loss			1270		
Blessed Isabelle of Valois	1225		1270		
Blessed Nicholas Fortiguera			1270		Bishop of Ajaccio
Fazzio	1190	Verona, Italy	1272		
Blessed Christopher de Romaniola	1172		1272		
Bonaventure	1221	Bagnoregio, Italy	1274	Lyon, France	Bishop of Albano
Thomas Aquinas	1225	Roccasecca, Italy	1274	Fossanuova Abbey, Italy	
Raymond of Peñafort	1175	Vilafranca del Penedès, Spain	1275	Barcelona, Spain	
Blessed John of Barastre			1275		
Sperandea	1216	Gubbio, Italy	1276		
Blessed Gregory X	1210		1276		Pope
Blessed Innocent V	1225		1276		Pope
Blessed Humbert of Romans	1200	Romans-sur-Isère, France	1277	Valence, Drôme, France	
Blessed Peter de la Cadireta			1277		
Zita	1218	Monsagrati near Lucca, Italy	1278	Lucca, Italy	
Blessed Albert of Bergamo			1279		
Albert the Great	1193	Lauingen, Germany	1280	Cologne, Germany	Bishop of Ratisbon
Blessed Novellone			1280		
Mary of Succor	1231		1281		
Agnes of Bohemia	1205	Prague, Czech Republic	1282	Prague, Czech Republic	
Benvenuto Scotivoli (Benvenutus)		Ancona, Italy	1282		Bishop of Osimo
Hugh dei Lippi Uggucioni			1282		
Ingrid of Skänninge			1282		
Thomas of Hereford	1218		1282		
Blessed Torello			1282		
Blessed John of Vercelli			1283		
Blessed Margaret Colonna			1284		
Philip Benizi	1233		1285		
Thorfinn			1285		
Blessed Luke Belludi	1200		1285		
Monaldus of Ancona (Monaldo)			1286		
Blessed Ambrose of Siena	1220		1287		
Blessed Peter Tecelano			1287		
Blessed Benvenuto of Recanati			1289		
Blessed Conrad of Ascoli			1289		
Blessed John of Parma	1209		1289		
Blessed Peter of Siena			1289		
Mary of Cerevellon			1290		
Cecilia			1290		
Blessed Franco of Grotti	1211		1291		
Kinga	1234		1292		
Blessed Benvenuta of Cividale	1254		1292		
Blessed Franco Lippi			1292		
Berencardus			1293		
Albertinus			1294		
Limbania			1294		
Thomas of Dover (Thomas Hales)			1295		
Celestine V	1215		1296		
Louis of Toulouse (Louis of Anjou)	1274		1297		Bishop of Toulouse
Margaret of Cortona	1247		1297		
Mechtildis of Helfta	1241		1298		
Blessed Gerard of Lunel (Gerius)	1275		1298		
Blessed Jacobus of Voragine, O.P.	1228		1298		
Blessed Yolande	1235		1299		
Bartholomew Buonpedoni			1300		
Peter Pascual	1227		1300		Bishop of Jaen
Radegund			1300		
Blessed Bartolo	1228		1300		
Blessed Bonizella			1300		
Blessed Ida of Louvain			1300		

== See also ==
- Christianity in the 13th century
