= Beatrice d'Este (disambiguation) =

Beatrice d'Este (alternately Beatrix d'Este; 1475–1497) was the daughter of Ercole I d'Este and Duchess of Milan.

Beatrice d'Este may also refer to:

- Beatrice d'Este (died 1226), beatified in the Roman Catholic Church, the daughter of Azzo VI d'Este
- Beatrice d'Este (died 1262), saint of the Roman Catholic Church, the daughter of Azzo VII d'Este
- Beatrice d'Este (1215–1245), Queen of Hungary, the daughter of Aldobrandino I d'Este
- Beatrice d'Este (1268–1334), mentioned in Dante’s Purgatorio
- Maria Beatrice d'Este, Duchess of Massa (1750–1829)
