= Peter Rodríguez =

Pete(r) Rodríguez or Rodriguez may refer to:

- Peter Rodríguez (curator) (1926–2016), American artist, curator, and museum director
- Peter Rodriguez (economist) (born 1968), American economist and professor
- Peter Rodriguez and companions (died 1242), Spanish Roman Catholic saint
- Pete Rodriguez (American football) (1940–2014), American football coach
- Pete "El Conde" Rodríguez (1932–2000), Puerto Rican salsa singer
- Pete Rodriguez (boogaloo musician) (1932–2024), American pianist and leader of a Puerto Rican boogaloo band
- Pete Rodriguez (jazz musician) (born 1969), jazz trumpeter and percussionist

== See also ==
- Peter Rodrigues (born 1944), Welsh footballer
