= San Alberto =

San Alberto is Spanish for Saint Albert, it may also refer to:

- San Alberto, Cesar, a town in Colombia
- San Alberto, Costa Rica, a town in Costa Rica
- San Alberto Department, a department in Argentina
- San Alberto, Paraguay, a town in Paraguay
