= Becherer =

Becherer is a German surname. Notable people with the surname include:

- Antonia Becherer (born 1963), German ice dancer
- Ferdinand Becherer (born 1963), German ice dancer
- Hans W. Becherer (1935–2016), American businessman
- Joseph Antenucci Becherer (born 1965), American curator, professor, writer, and arts administrator
- Kelley Becherer (born 1990), American Paralympic swimmer
