= Azzo VI d'Este =

Italian condotierro (1170–1212)

Azzo VI d’Este
- Marquis of Este; Lord of Ferrara
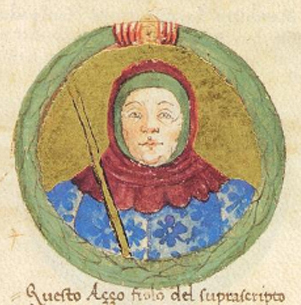
- Azzo depicted in Genealogia dei principi d'Este
- Tenure: 1209-1212
- Predecessor: Fulco I, Margrave of Milan
- Successor: Azzo VII d'Este
- Born: 1170
- Died: November 1212 (aged 41–42)
- Noble family: House of Este
- Spouses: Elisa; Unknown daughter of Humbert III, Count of Savoy; Alice
- Issue: Aldobrandino I d'Este; Blessed Beatrice d'Este; Azzo VII d'Este
- Father: Azzo V d’Este

Azzo VI (1170 – November 1212), also known as Azzolino, was an Italian nobleman and condottiero. He held the title of Marquis of Este (marchio Eystensis) from the death of his father, Azzo V, in 1190 until his death.

== Biography ==
He was heavily involved in the Guelph politics of Lombardy in the first decade of the 13th century, serving as podestà of Ferrara (1196, 1205, and 1208), Padua (1199), Verona (1206–1207), and Mantua (1207–1208 and 1210–1211).

In his capacity as a leading Guelph condottiero, Azzo fought a prolonged war with Salinguerra Torelli. In 1205 he conquered and razed the castle of Fratta, residence of Salinguerra. His opponent responded by allying with Ezzelino II da Romano and drove Azzo away, but the next year (1206) he reconquered Fratta, which he held until 1209.

When Emperor Otto IV descended to Italy, he had Azzo and Salinguerra reconciled. However, after Salinguerra left the alliance, Azzo entered the league formed by Pope Innocent III against the emperor. In 1208 the pope made him Marquis of Ancona, while the people of Ferrara named him as the city's seignior.

In 1212 Azzo sided with the exiles from Vicenza in the war against Ezzelino, but the latter defeated him at Pontalto near Vicenza. Azzo took refuge in Verona, where he died in November of that year.

== Family ==
Azzo's first wife Elisa, a daughter of a count Aldobrandino, was dead by 1192. They had a son, Aldobrandino I, who succeeded his father in 1212 (who had a daughter, Beatrice d'Este, Queen of Hungary).

By 1192 he had remarried to a daughter of Humbert III of Savoy, named either Sophia or Eleanor (as per the epitaph of their daughter Beatrice). She died on 3 December 1202. They had his only daughter, Beatrice, later Abbess of Monte Gemmola.

On 22 February 1204 Azzo married for the third time to Alice (also called Alix), daughter of Raynald of Châtillon, Prince of Antioch. While Alberic de Trois-Fontaines calls Aleydem marchionis Eystensis in Italia as the third of the three daughters of Raynaldus de Castellione uxor ... relictam principis Raymundi, that is, by Raynald's first wife, the daughter of Raymond of Antioch, it is unlikely that Alice could have been born before 1167, the latest possible date for Raynald's first wife's death. She was more likely the daughter of Raynald's last wife, Stephanie de Milly. By his third and last wife he left a son, Azzo VII, who eventually succeeded his elder brother and became head of the family.

== Culture ==
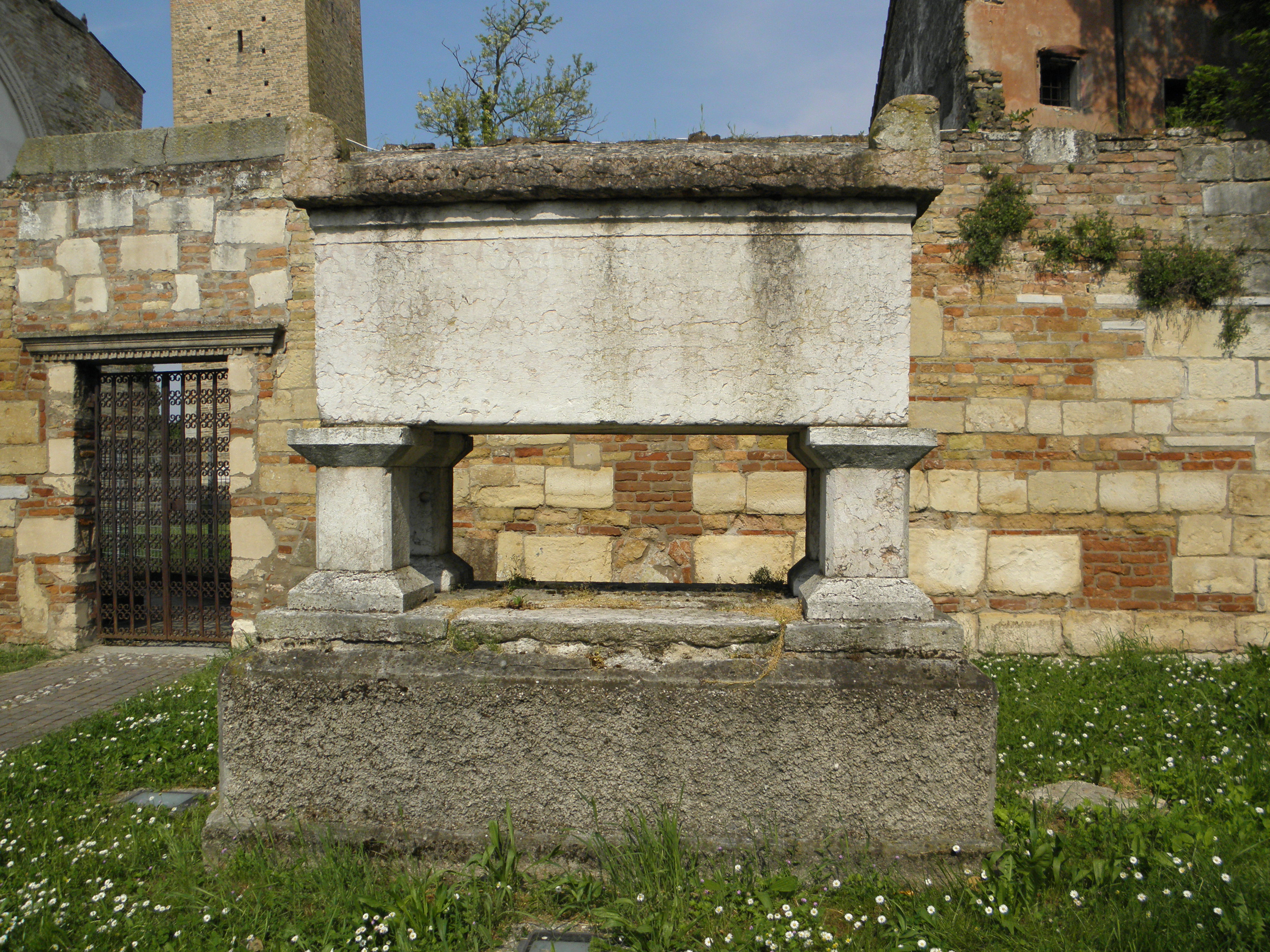
The sarcophagus which once housed the remains of Azzo VI d'Este and his wife Alice of Châtillon, in the Abbey of Vangadizza, Badia Polesine.

Azzo's court was a cultural centre in northern Italy, drawing poets and artists from afar. He played host and patron to the troubadours Aimeric de Peguilhan, Peire Raimon de Tolosa, and Rambertino Buvalelli. Rambertino celebrated Azzo's daughter Beatrice in all of his love songs, an overtly political act in the climate of the times.

In a contemporary vernacular vita of his daughter, the biography sums up Azzo's character and reputation: "he was beautiful of form, almost more than all other men. A prudent yet daring man, valiant in feats of arms and of perspicacious learning: a wise and marvellous conversationalist." Azzo is also mentioned in the third canto of Ludovico Ariosto's Orlando Furioso, where the sorceress is telling Bradamant of his illustrious descendants:

Here is another Azzo; Verona shall be his, with its fair territory; and to him shall the Fourth Otto and Honorius II grant the title of Marquis of Ancona. It would take me all too long were I to show you every one of your descendants who shall be standard-bearer at the Consistory, or were I to relate every exploit accomplished by them for the Church of Rome.

== Sources ==
- Bertoni, Giulio (1915). I Trovatori d'Italia: Biografie, testi, tradizioni, note. Rome: Società Multigrafica Editrice Somu.
- Cabré, Miriam (1999). "Italian and Catalan troubadours". In Simon B. Gaunt and Sarah Kay (ed.). The Troubadours: An Introduction. Cambridge: Cambridge University Press. pp. 127–140. ISBN 0-521-57473-0.
- Previte Orton, C. W. (1912). The Early History of the House of Savoy: 1000–1233. Cambridge University Press.

Preceded by Folco I	Marquis of Este; 1209–1212	Succeeded by Azzo VII
Preceded by Folco I	Lord of Ferrara; 1209–1212	Succeeded by Azzo VII
