= Snite Museum of Art =

University fine art museum in Indiana, United States

Snite Research Center in the Visual Arts
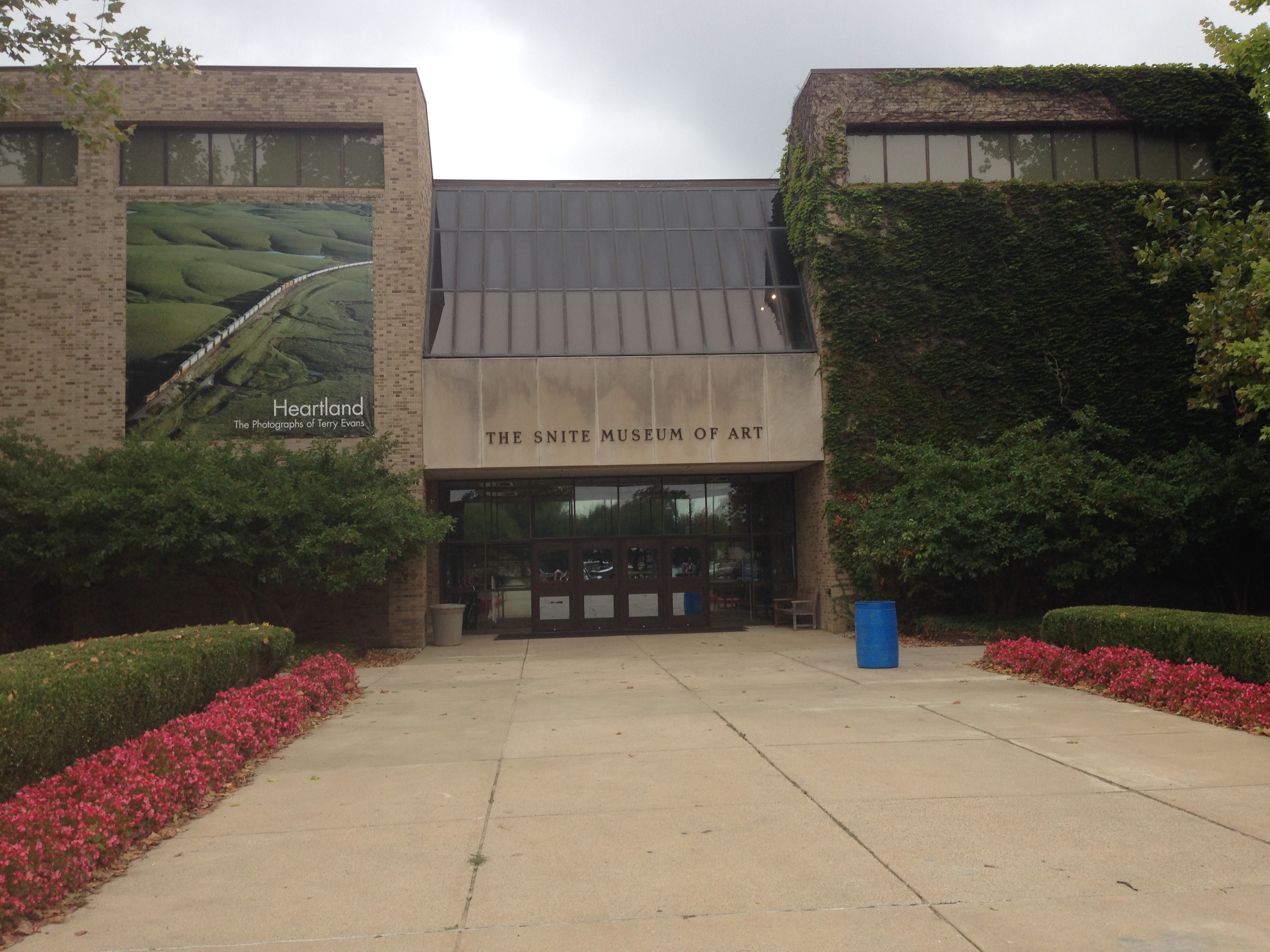
- The Snite Museum of Art in 2013

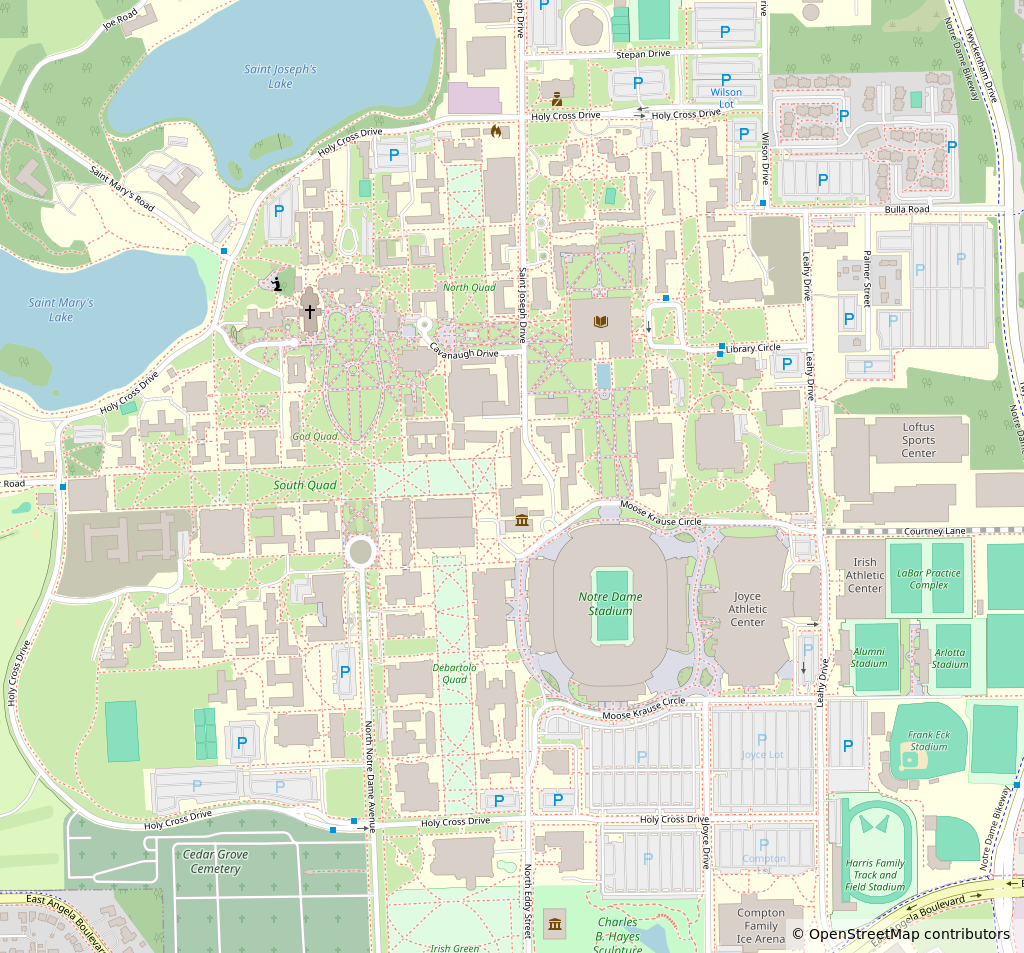
- Location within Notre Dame, Indiana
- Established: 1980
- Location: University of Notre Dame; 100 Moose Krause Circle; Notre Dame, Indiana
- Coordinates: 41.699490°N 86.235008°W
- Type: Art

The Snite Research Center in the Visual Arts, formerly known as the Snite Museum of Art, is the former art museum of the University of Notre Dame, located on its campus near South Bend, Indiana. The museum held around 30,000 works of art spanning cultures, eras, and media. It supported faculty teaching and research and through programs, lectures, workshops, and exhibitions. Students played a role as gallery guides and as student advisory members.

In April 2023, the Snite Museum closed in anticipation of the completion of the new Raclin Murphy Museum of Art, less than half a mile to the south, which opened in December 2023. The building was renamed as a research center, and currently supports ongoing care of the collection and research for the Raclin Murphy's holdings and houses the curatorial and administrative offices.

== History ==
The Bishops Gallery and Museum of Indian Antiquities established about 1875 in the Main Building, preceded the Snite Museum building which was constructed in 1980. By 1924, the Wightman Memorial Art Gallery had opened in Bond Hall. In 1952, O'Shaughnessy Hall, home of the Notre Dame College of Arts and Letters, included exhibition galleries. During the 1950s, Croatian sculptor Ivan Meštrović was in residence at the university, working in the eponymous Meštrović Studio.

In 1975, the Fred B. Snite family donated funds to construct the Snite Museum of Art. The museum opened in 1980, incorporating both Meštrović's sculpture studio (Snite is also home to the Ivan Meštrović papers) and the O'Shaughnessy art gallery, the latter used for the presentation of traveling and temporary exhibitions.

Joseph Antenucci Becherer became new director of the museum in 2018.

With a new museum being constructed elsewhere on the campus, the Snite Museum closed in 2023, with plans to become the Snite Research Center in the Visual Arts.

== Museum Building and future replacement ==
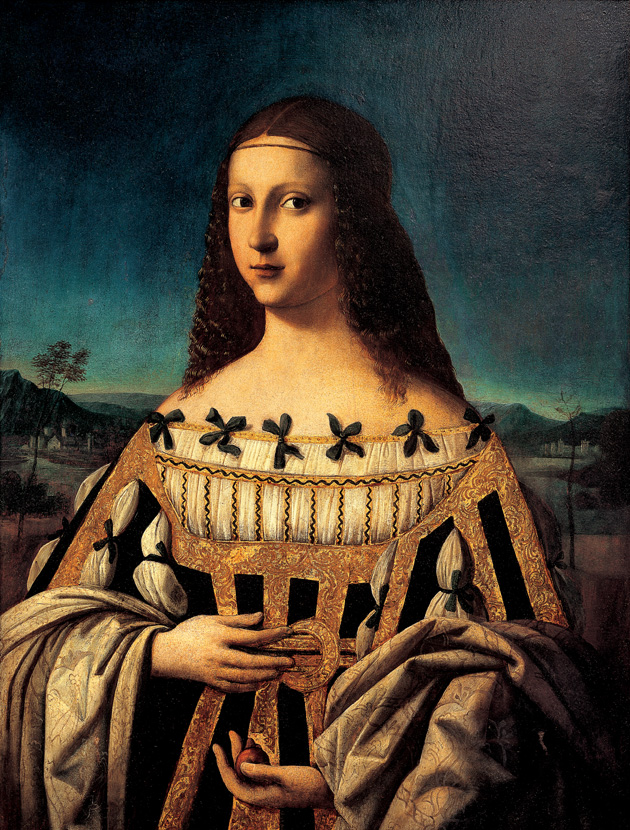
Portrait of Beatrice II d'Esteby Bartolomeo Veneto, part of the Renaissance collection

The museum opened in the fall of 1980, consolidating the adjacent O'Shaughnessy Hall Galleries and the studio of sculptor Ivan Meštrović with the new structure. The 70,000 square-foot building, designed by Ambrose Richardson, A.I.A., was a gift of the Snite Family in memory of Frederick Jr. '33.

With the donation in 2018 of funds from lead benefactors Ernestine Raclin and her daughter and son-in-law Carmen and Chris Murphy, enabled the construction of the new Museum complex built in two phases on the south edge of campus. The first phase of the Raclin Murphy Museum of Art includes approximately 70,000 square feet which houses the museum galleries and other functions. The design firm Robert A.M. Stern Architects (RAMSA) were the architects of the new museum, appointed in 2019. Construction began in April 2020 and the new building was opened on 1 December 2023.

== Collections ==
The Museum's holdings include prints, photography, French 18th- and 19th painting, Baroque period paintings, decorative arts, African art, Olmec and Mesoamerican art, Native American art and 20th-century art. Donated and gifted collections include the Jack and Alfrieda Feddersen Collection of Rembrandt Etchings; the Noah L. and Muriel S. Butkin Collection of 19th-Century French Art; the John D. Reilly Collection of Old Master and 19th-Century Drawings, the Janos Scholz Collection of 19th-Century European Photographs; the Mr. and Mrs. Russell G. Ashbaugh Jr. Collection of Meštrović Sculpture and Drawings; the George Rickey Sculpture Archive; and the Virginia A. Martin Collection of 18th-Century Decorative Arts.

=== Sculpture park ===
A private donation by Charles S. Hayes made possible the creation of a public space for reflection, contemplation, and enjoyment of nature and art. Reopened in 2017, the Charles B. Hayes Family Sculpture Park was designed by American landscape architect Michael Van Valkenburgh on an eight-acre site at the south edge of the Notre Dame campus. A part of the Museum's permanent collection, the twelve sculptures in the park are by national and international artists, including Wing Generator by Richard Hunt.

== Outreach programs ==
Throughout the year, the Museum provides curriculum-related tours for 7,000 area-school children; after-school and summer programs at the Robinson Community Learning Center; summer art camps for at-risk children; art instruction for student teachers; and workshops for local K-12 instructors.
