= Antenucci =

Antenucci is an Italian surname that is a variant of Antonucci. Notable people with the surname include:

- Alfred Antenucci, American labor official who intervened in the Reagan assassination attempt
- Daniel Antenucci (born 1964), Argentinian/Italian research scientist and professor
- Joseph Antenucci Becherer (born 1965), American curator, professor, writer, and arts administrator
- Mirco Antenucci (born 1984), Italian footballer

== See also ==
- Antonucci
