= Gerold =

Gerold is a given name. Notable people with the name include:

- Gerold Bührer (born 1948), Swiss politician and member of the National Council (1991–2007)
- Gerold of Cologne (1201–1251), martyr and saint
- Gerold Löffler (born 1967), Swiss bobsledder who has competed in the early 1990s
- Gerold Schwarzenbach (1904–1978), Swiss chemist
- Gerold Späth (born 1939), Swiss poet and writer
- Gerold of Anglachgau (c. 730 – 784/786 or 795) was a count in Kraichgau and Anglachgau
- Gerold, Prefect of Bavaria (died 799), Margrave of the Avarian March and Prefect of Bavaria

== See also ==
- Sankt Gerold, municipality in the district of Bludenz in Vorarlberg, Austria
