= Order of the Eagle of Este =

Order of the Eagle of Este Ordine dell'Aquila Estense
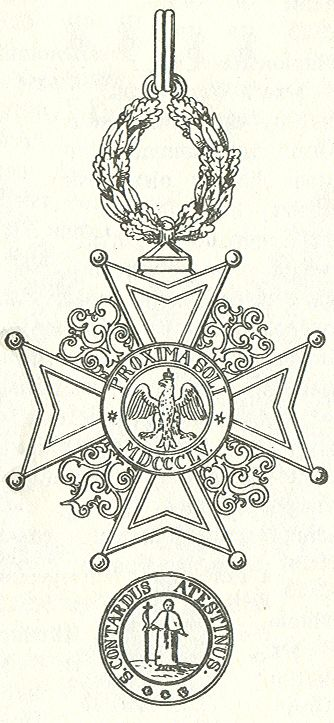
- Order's medal

Awarded by Duchy of Modena and Reggio
- Type: Chivalric order with three degrees
- Established: 27 December 1855
- Motto: PROXIMA SOLI
- Awarded for: Faithful civilians and officers and distinguished foreigners
- Status: former order
- Founder: Francis V of Modena
- Grades: Grand Cross; Commander; Knight

Precedence
- Next (higher): None (highest)
- Next (lower): Cross of Seniority of Service
- Ribbon bar of the Order

The Order of the Eagle of Este is a knighthood order of the dynastic house of Duchy of Modena and Reggio, a former sovereign state before the Italian unification.

The Order was instituted on 27 December 1855 by Francis V of Modena, Duke of Modena and Reggio, to reward the services and the merits of faithful civilians and officers. The order was established under the protection (patronage) of Saint Contardo of Este, a maternal ancestor of the founder (House of Este), and protector of Modena.

== Grades ==
The order is divided in three classes:

- Grand Cross
- Commander
- Knight

The class of Grand Cross was limited to a maximum of ten members, the class of Commander to twenty members, and the class of Knights to sixty. Foreigners appointed into the Order were counted as supernumerary knights, not affected by these limits.

All grants provided personal noble status to the recipient. If this was mentioned in the letters patent, it could also be hereditary.

The "Royal Parish of the Court" served as Church of the Order.

Knight	Commander	Grand Cross

== The insignia ==
The medal of the order consisted of a white-enameled cross border of "overseas azure", subdivided in eight "golden-balls" points. In the middle was an azure shield with a white eagle in its center, antique symbol of the Este. In the superior part of the shield, one can read the motto PROXIMA SOLI, and the inferior part, the data of foundation MDCCCLV. At the back, the shield shows the Saint Contardo's effigy with the inscription: S. CONTARDUS ATESTINUS. Between the four arms of the cross, four golden cursive letters, to form the word E S T E. The cross is surmounted by a trophy for the military class, by an oak crown for the civilian class, and a royal crown for foreign knights.

The ribbon is white bordered with sky-blue stripes.

The founder, Francis V, continued to grant the Order, even in the years of his exile.
