= Aldobrandino I d'Este =

13th-century Italian nobleman

Aldobrandino I d’Este
- Lord of Ferrara; Marquis of Este
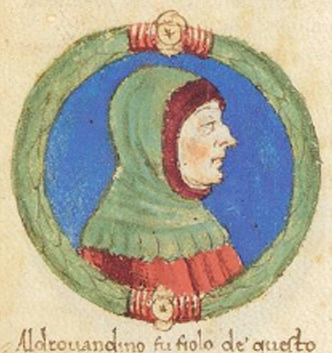
- Aldobrandino I depicted in the Genealogia dei principi d'Este (1470s)
- Tenure: 1212-1215
- Predecessor: Azzo VI d'Este
- Successor: Obizzo II d'Este
- Born: 1190; Ferrara
- Died: 10 October 1215 (aged 24–25)
- Noble family: House of Este
- Issue: Contardo of Este; Beatrice d'Este, Queen of Hungary
- Father: Azzo VI d'Este

Aldobrandino I d'Este (c. 1190 – 10 October 1215) was the Marquis of Este and Ferrara.

== Biography ==
Aldobrandino was born in 1190 as the son of Azzo VI d’Este. He was co-ruler with his half-brother Azzo VII as Marquis of Este and Ferrara through 1212 until his death. He was also the father of the posthumous Saint Contardo of Este. His daughter, Beatrice, married King Andrew II of Hungary and thus became Queen of Hungary. Aldobrandino died at the age of either 24 or 25.

Preceded by Azzo VI d'Este	Marquis of Ferrara	Succeeded by Obizzo II d'Este
