= Bartolomeo Veneto =

Italian painter (active 1502–1531)

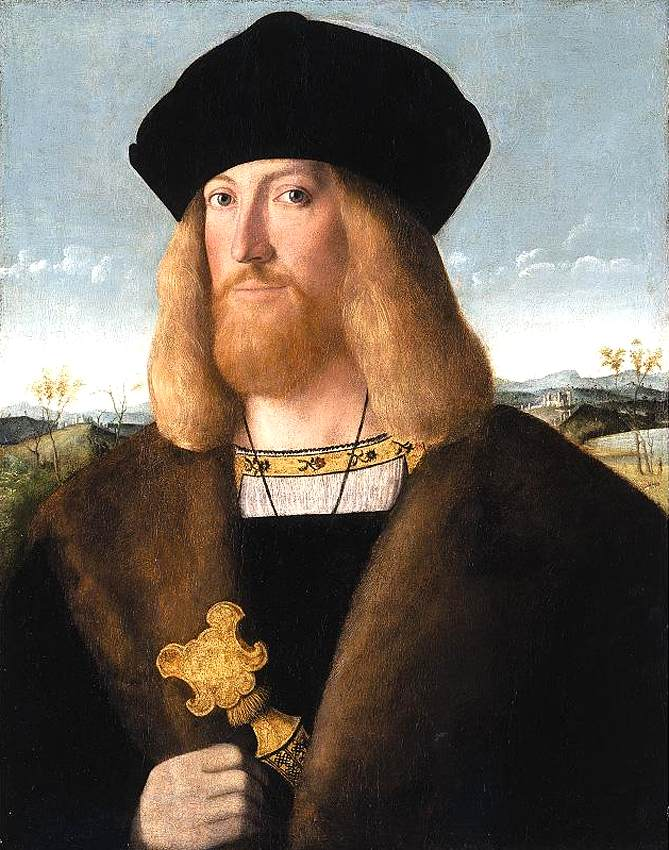
Bartolomeo Veneto, Portrait of a Bearded Gentleman (c.1510; Private collection)

Bartolomeo Veneto (active 1502–31) was an Italian painter who worked in Venice, the Veneto (the mainland), and Lombardy. During his time in Venice, he studied under Gentile Bellini. The little information available about Bartolomeo's life has been derived from his signatures, dates, and inscriptions. His best-known works are portraits or pictures with portrait-like character. Bartolomeo's later works, and especially those done on commission in Milan, indicate an influence from the artist Leonardo da Vinci.

== Work and style ==
Bartolomeo’s early works consist of small devotional pictures. Bartolomeo changed his subject matter to suit his patrons as the interest in portraiture grew in Venice and the Veneto. His portraits became quite popular and in his later life Bartolomeo obtained many commissions in Northern Italy.

=== Attribution ===
While forty paintings are generally accepted to be by Bartolomeo, only nine bear inscriptions with the artist's name. A fourth of the generally accepted works are devotional paintings, which were painted during his early career. All of his paintings were done on wood (few were later moved to canvas.) He appears to have received no public commissions and the majority of his work consists of portraiture.

=== Inscriptions ===
Bartolomeo’s earliest dated work, Virgin and Child from 1502, bears an interesting signature important to our understanding of the painter’s developing style, "Bartolamio mezo venizian e mezo cremonexe" (“Bartolomeo half-Venetian and half-Cremonese.”) The inscription sheds light on the painter’s citizenship, as well as a reference to his diverse stylistic influence. The Venetian half reflects his knowledge of Bellini. The Cremonese suggests some knowledge of the Cremonese school founded by Giulio Campi.

Another inscription is found on a similar Virgin and Child. The inscription is difficult to read and the date is unknown. What is left is "7 April 15... bartolamio s...o de z...be..." It is assumed that Bartolomeo inscribed the painting to indicate that he was a pupil of Gentile (Zentile) Bellini.

=== At court ===
Bartolomeo is very likely to have been "Bartolomeo da Venetia" who the Este court recorded as a craftsman in its service from 1505 to 1507. There, Bartolomeo gilded frames and made carnival decorations along with painting a Virgin with saints.

=== Portraiture ===
Flora from c. 1515 is currently attributed to Bartolomeo. The unknown figure is painted with hard edges and a descriptive quality. Though the sitter is unknown, she is thought (and perhaps wrongly) to be Lucrezia Borgia. Close to a genre painting, the painting could be a response to similar paintings by Giorgione including the Laura. Bartolomeo placed the figure in front of a black background, a theme that would follow in his later paintings such as Saint Catherine, Salome with the Head of the St. John the Baptist, and Lady playing a Lute.

Documents suggest Bartolomeo went to Padua in 1512 and Milan in 1520. Leonardo da Vinci had recently been to Milan, where he transformed the current mundane portraiture into one of intrigue and sfumato. Leonardo's effect is evident in Bartolomeo's developing style when juxtaposing Flora and Lady playing a Lute. Flora's hair is flat and each detailed single strand is painted, much detail is paid to the flowers and jewelry draped across her body. Lady Playing a Lute's figure is more three-dimensional with an emphasis of chiaroscuro. Her hair, rather than individual strands, has some sense of being whole while still being separate.

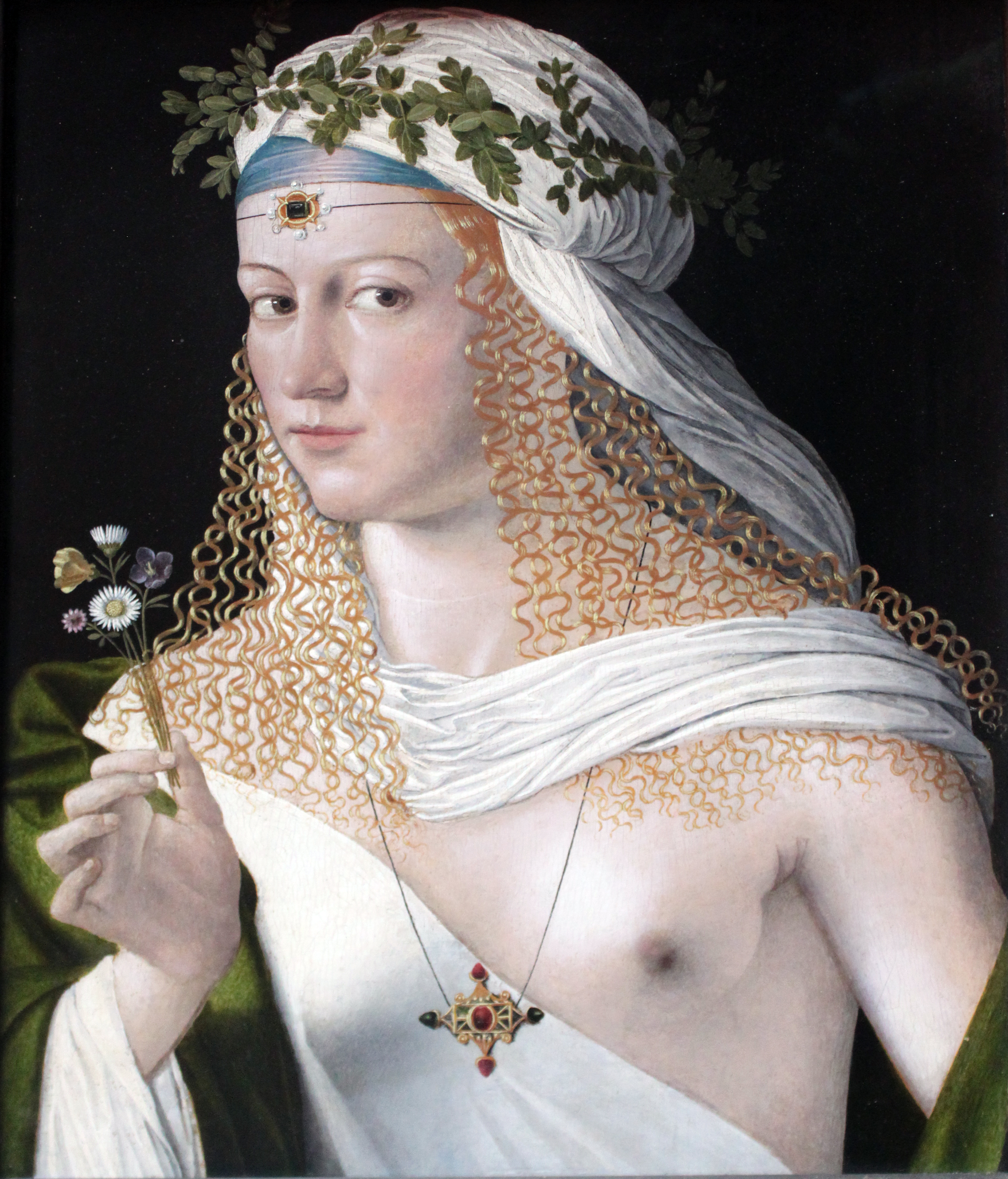
Flora (c. 1520), tempera and oil on poplar wood, 43.6 x 34.6 cm., Städelsches Kunstinstitut und Städtische Galerie, Frankfurt

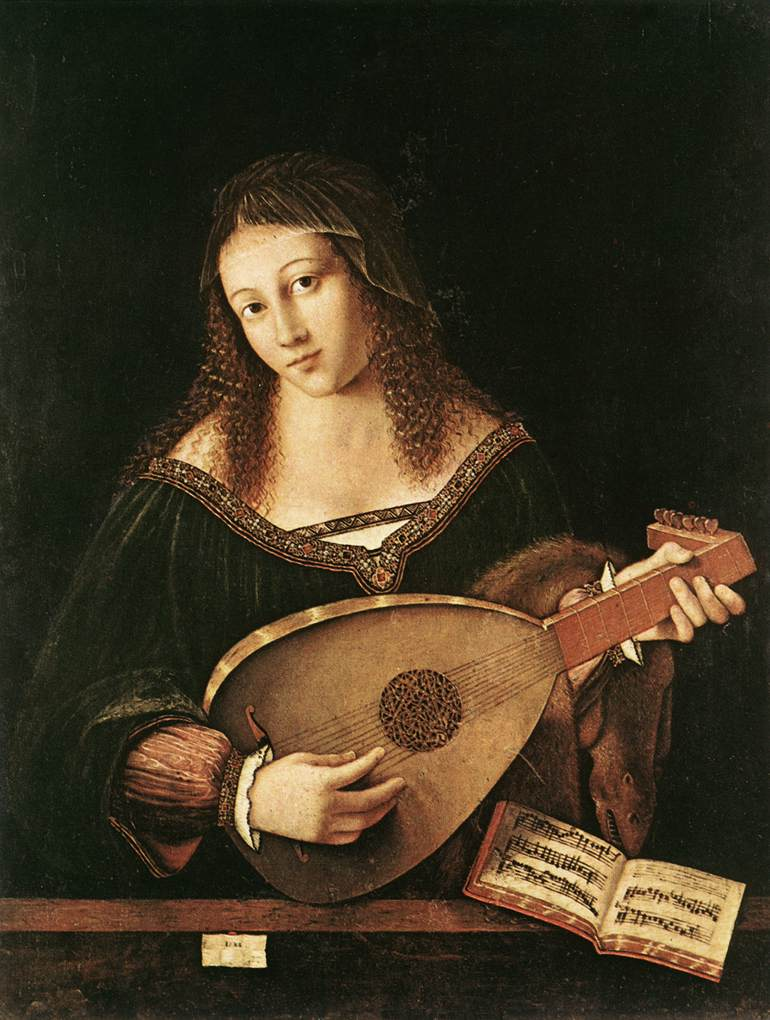
Lady Playing Lute (1520), oil on panel, 65 x 50 cm., Pinacoteca di Brera, Milan

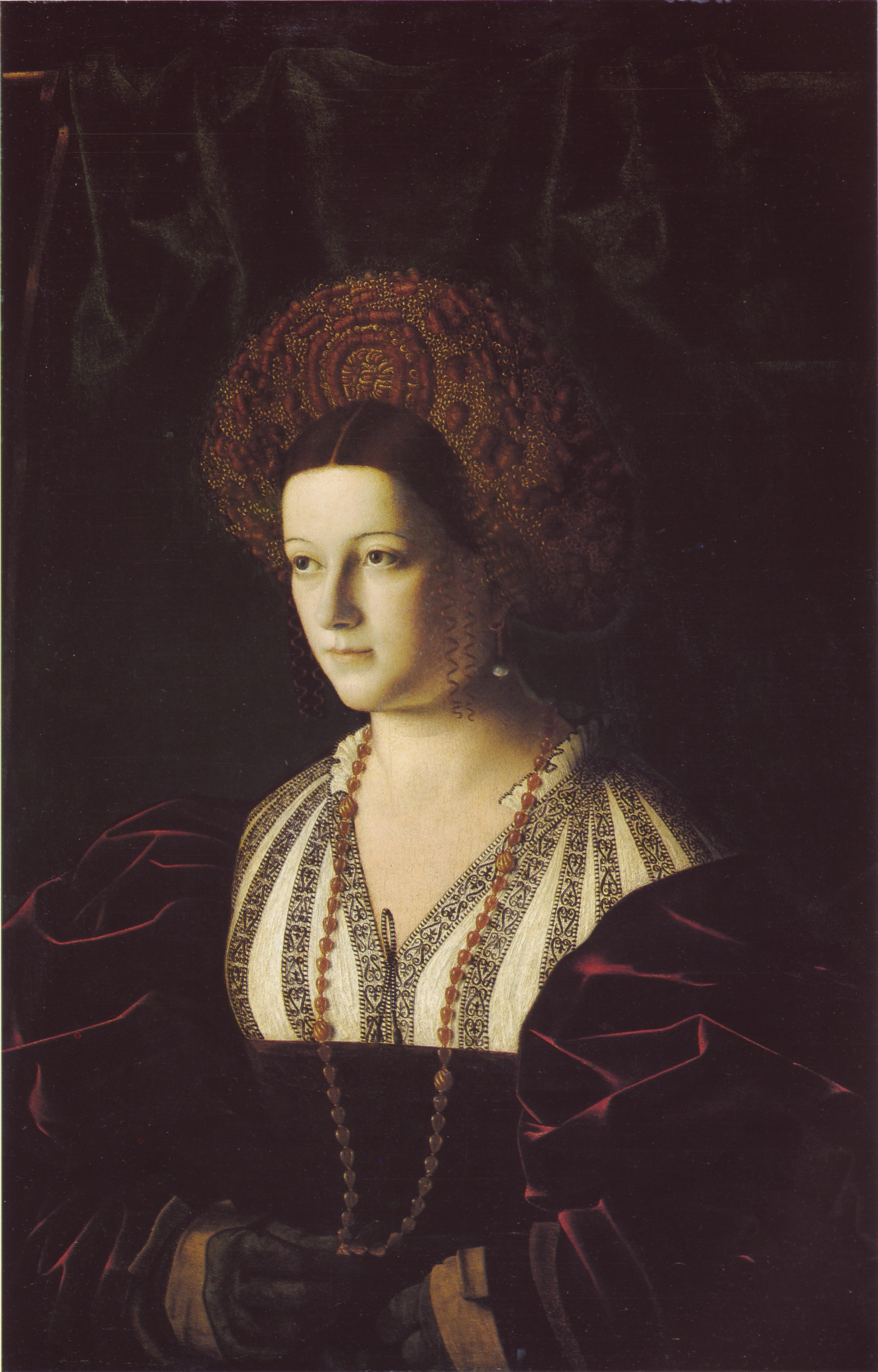
Ritratto Di Gentildonna, National Gallery of Canada, Ottawa

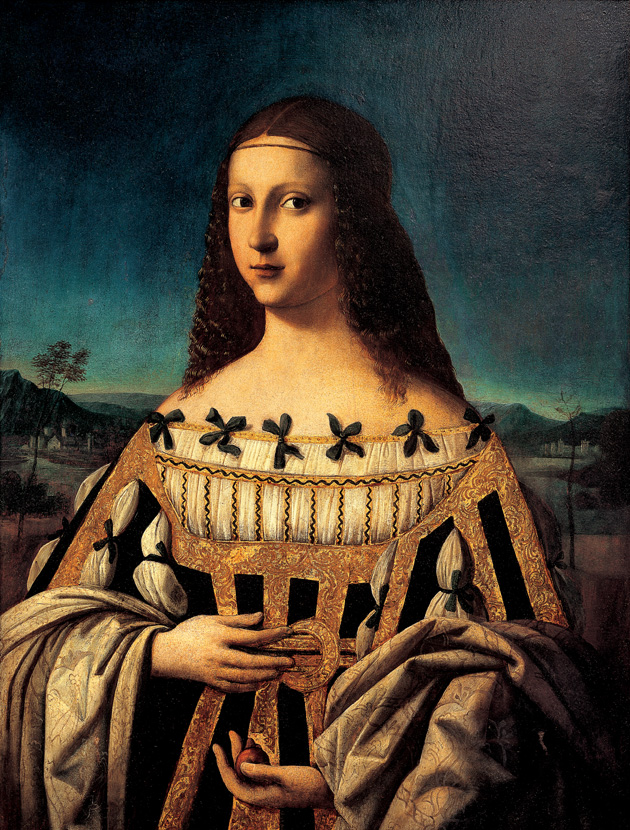
Saint Beatrice d'Este (1510s), oil on canvas, 75 x 56 cm., Snite Museum of Art, South Bend, Indiana

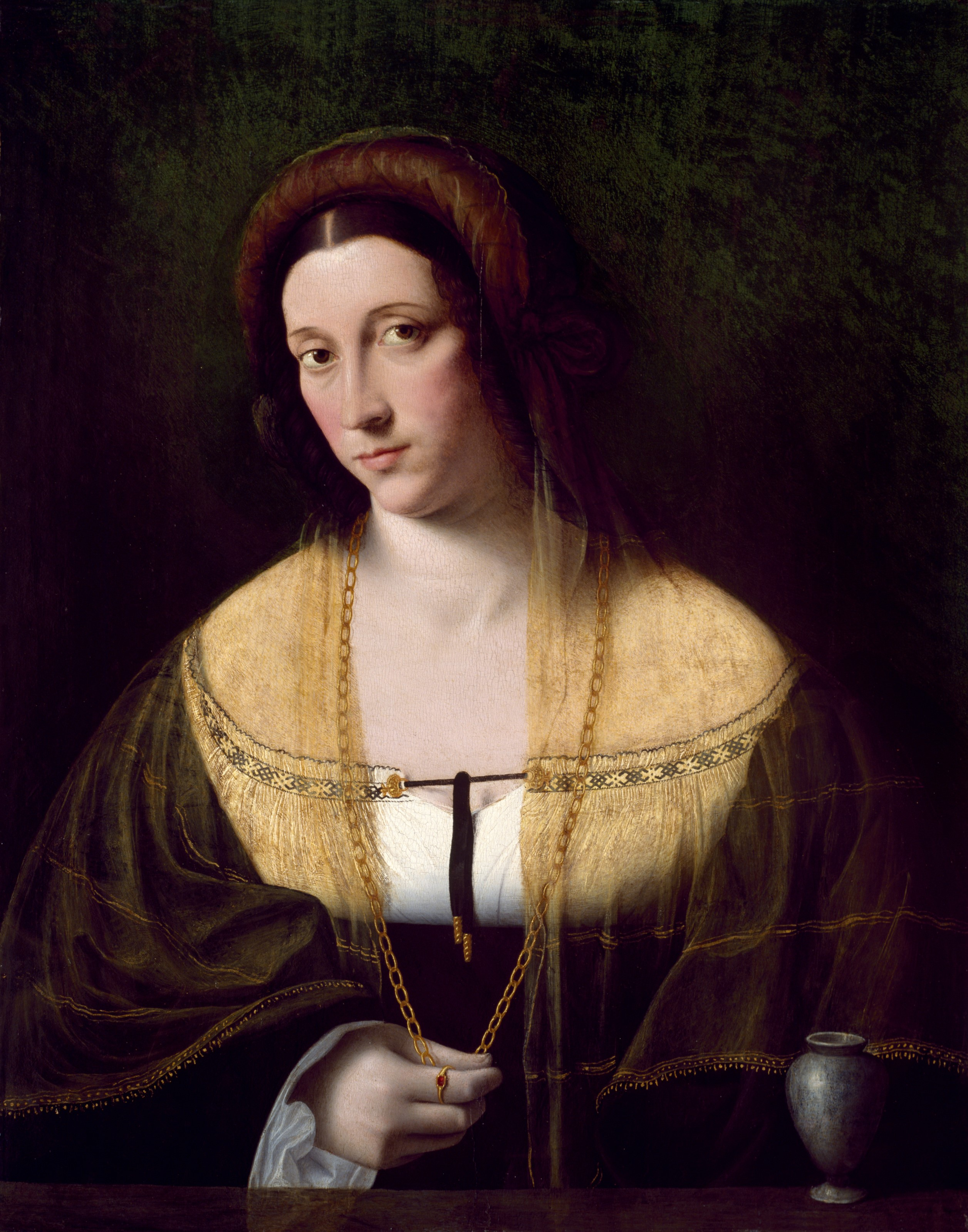
Portrait of a Lady (early 16th century), oil on panel, 57.7 x 44.4 mm., Museum of Fine Arts, Houston

== Recent interest ==
Bartolomeo's signed works have been recorded since the 16th century. However, it wasn't until the nineteenth century that interest arose in the collection of his works. The mid-nineteenth century saw sales of Bartolomeo's works to prominent museums. Alexander Barker, a collector of Italian paintings, acquired (along with paintings attributed to Titian and Giorgione) a painting by Bartolomeo. He later sold the painting to Baron Meyer Amschel de Rothschild and eventually the painting ended up in the Timken Museum of Art in San Diego. In the same year, the National Gallery acquired a portrait by Bartolomeo. In 1871 four of Bartolomeo's works were given to the Louvre. At the very end of the nineteenth century, in 1899, Adolfo Venturi published the first article about the painter.

== Main works ==
- Salome with the Head of Saint John the Baptist, c. 1520, Dresden, Germany, Gemäldegalerie
- The Circumcision, 1506, Paris, France, Musée du Louvre, Inv. no. R.F. 2485
- Portrait of Gentleman, Rome, Italy, Galleria Nazionale d'Arte Antica, Sala 6
- Portrait of a Man, c. 1510, Cleveland, Ohio, USA, The Cleveland Museum of Art
- Beatrice d'Este ', c.1510. Snite Museum of Art, IN, USA
- Lady Playing Lute, c. 1530, Los Angeles, USA, The J. Paul Getty Museum at the Getty Center
- Madonna, 1502, Venice, Italy, Collection of Donà delle Rose
- Madonna della Ca'd'Oro, 1505, Bergamo, Italy, Accademia Carrara
- Madonna di Bergamo, 1505, Bergamo, Italy, Accademia Carrara Image
- Ritratto di Beatrice d'Este II, 1510, Ferrara, Italy
- Ritratto di gentiluomo, 1512, Rome, Italy, Palazzo Barberini
- Saint Catherine (attributed), 1510–1520, Glasgow, United Kingdom, Kelvingrove Art Gallery and Museum
- Courtesan, c. 1520-25, Frankfurt am Main, Germany, Städelsches Kunstinstitut und Städtische Galerie
- Lucrezia Borgia, 1510–1520, Nîmes, France, Musée des Beaux-Arts.
- Portrait of a Lady, c. 1520, Ottawa, Ontario, Canada, National Gallery of Canada, Inv. no. 16909
- Ludovico Martinengo (attributed), 1530, London, United Kingdom, National Gallery, Inv. no. NG287
- Portrait of a Man (attributed), c. 1525–1630, Madrid, Spain, Thyssen-Bornemizsa Museum, Inv. no. 30 (1930.8)
