= Dan Dorfman =

American journalist

Dan Dorfman (October 24, 1929 – June 16, 2012) was an American financial journalist, at one time a columnist for the New York Sun newspaper. Dorfman was a prominent CNBC commentator in the 1990s and a columnist for Money magazine. He also was a CNN financial news commentator in the 1980s, and a columnist for The Wall Street Journal early in his career.

== Personal life ==
Dorfman grew up in a Brooklyn orphanage. He attended the New York School of Printing, graduating in 1949. Dorfman was divorced in 1986 from his wife Iris, and had one daughter, Leah Dorfman Kelly. His daughter died on November 30, 2008. He remarried, Harriet Kasenetz Dorfman, and until his death resided in New York City.

== Career ==
As a CNBC "stock picker" in the mid-1990s, Dorfman's commentaries were closely followed by stock market traders. Stocks would move sharply as soon as a stock pick by Dorfman would be announced on CNBC. The Chicago Board Options Exchange went as far as to instituting a "Dorfman Rule", where exchange authorities could halt trading in a stock that Dorfman referred to on television. The NASDAQ also considered controlling volatility caused by Dorfman's on-air picks. The NASDAQ proposed to sometimes suspend trading in any stock mentioned by "a well known, recognized, and influential stock analyst or commentator", and confirmed they were talking about Dorfman. Dorfman supported the "Dorfman Rule": "I'm not looking to cause volatility in stocks. I'm not looking to cause them to go up or down. If there's a way to prevent people from, you know, losing money on a fast train basis, I think it's a good idea."

Dorfman was dismissed from a job writing a column at Money magazine in 1995 for refusing to disclose his sources to his editor. He was suspended from the magazine earlier that year after it was reported in the press that he was the target of a federal probe for having a business relationship with a "stock promoter", and for possible insider trading according to sources cited by Businessweek magazine. The Securities and Exchange Commission and the Justice Department never confirmed or denied the report, and Dorfman denied any wrongdoing: "I want to make it clear that I have never asked for or received payments for any stories. I have not bought or sold a stock in five years and I have not violated any laws." As a result of the investigation that reportedly included Dorfman, a former lawyer for Securities and Exchange Commission and five others were indicted on charges of securities fraud involving two Nasdaq companies. Dorfman was not cited in the indictment.

In 1996, Dorfman suffered a mild stroke, but recovered fully.

In 2006, Lazlo Birinyi, a Forbes magazine columnist, compared Jim Cramer's ability to move stocks with television commentary to Dorfman's mid-1990s appearances on CNBC.

In 2008 Dorfman had been writing a column for the New York Sun, but in October 2008 his bylined articles ended.

Dorfman died at age 80 on June 16, 2012, at New York Hospital. According to the family, he died from cardiogenic shock, a heart condition.
