= High School of Graphic Communication Arts =

Public school in New York City

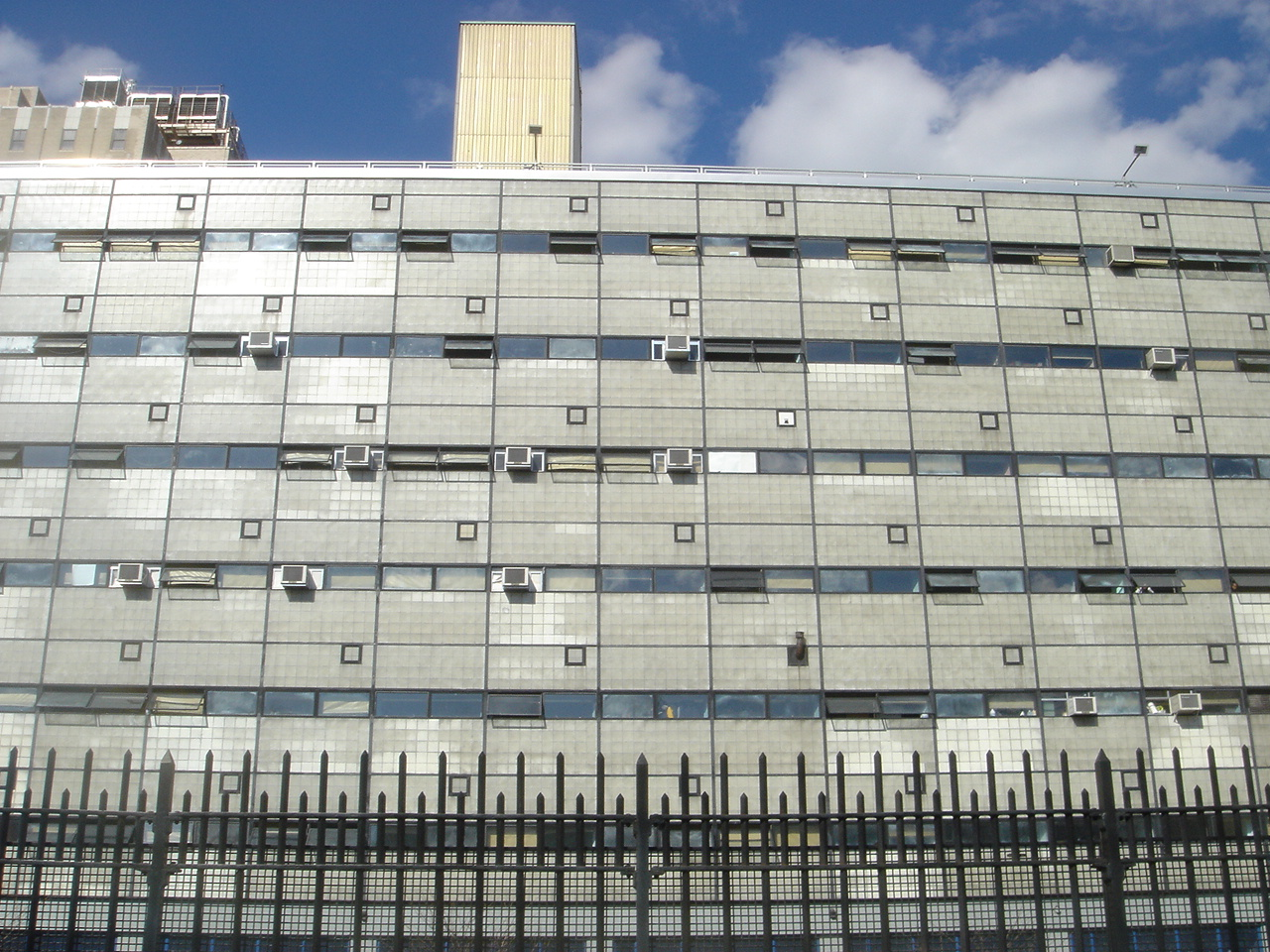
- West 49th Street facade

Location
- 439 West 49th Street; New York City, New York 10019; United States; 40°45′48″N 73°59′26″W

Information
- School district: New York City Geographical District 2
- Superintendent: Elaine Gorman
- School number: 625
- Principal: Brendan Lyons
- Grades: 9-12
- Enrolment: 1,344

The High School of Graphic Communication Arts (H.S.G.C.A.) is a vocational high school located in the Hell's Kitchen section of Manhattan in New York City. Founded in 1925 as the New York School of Printing, the school is divided into five academies that offer basic instruction in several fields including printing, photography, journalism, visual arts, and law enforcement.

== History ==
The building that now houses the school was built in 1959 by the architectural firm of Kelly & Gruzen (now known as Gruzen Samton Architects) and is one of the best known structures designed utilizing a vigorous display of the international architectural style movement in the city. It was also the first high school in the city to have escalators. The school is home to a mural, located at its main entrance, that was designed by Hans Hofmann, one of the leading artists of the Abstract Expressionist movement. The building is located on West 49th Street between 9th and 10th Avenues.

The school was the original home of Metropolitan Playhouse, resident until 1995, and has since leased some of its space to the Manhattan Playhouse to serve as a community theater that showcases many local off-Broadway productions.

In October 2010, it was announced that the school was on the New York City Department of Education's shortlist of schools targeted for closing. It was one of two schools in Manhattan on the list, and the only high school in the borough scheduled to be closed due to poor academic performance. On 26 April 2012, the city's Board of Education voted to close the school after the then-current class graduated in June 2012. On May 11, 2012, the city's education department announced that the school would be reopened in the fall 2012 as the Creative Digital Minds High School. However, on June 29, 2012, a ruling by a legal arbitrator announced that all 24 schools slated to close under the city's "Turn Around" program (which included Graphics) would remain open. The ruling halted a central element of Mayor Michael Bloomberg's plans for closing and reopening the affected schools, saying its method for overhauling the staff at those institutions violated existing labor contracts.

The Success Academy Charter Schools group planned to open an elementary school in the same building as the high school in 2013. The location was suggested by the city's education department. In addition, Success Academy Charter School – Manhattan Middle School was planned to open for school year 2015–2016 to educate the middle school grades of several other Success Academies.

== Notable alumni ==
- Dan Dorfman – financial journalist
- David Horowitz – consumer advocate
- Pete "El Conde" Rodríguez - Salsa singer
