= Antonucci =

Antonucci is an Italian surname. Notable people with the surname include:

- Danny Antonucci (born 1957), Canadian animator, director, producer, and writer
- Dominic Antonucci, American ballet master and ex-principal dancer with the Birmingham Royal Ballet
- Francesco Antonucci (born 1999), Belgian-Italian footballer
- Giorgio Antonucci (1933–2017), Italian physician, known for his questioning of the basis of psychiatry
- Jena Antonucci (born 1975 or 1976), American thoroughbred horse trainer
- Mirko Antonucci (born 1999), Italian footballer
- Toni Antonucci (born 1948), American psychologist

== See also ==
- Antenucci
