= Contardo of Este =

Italian Roman Catholic saint

Saint Contardo of Este
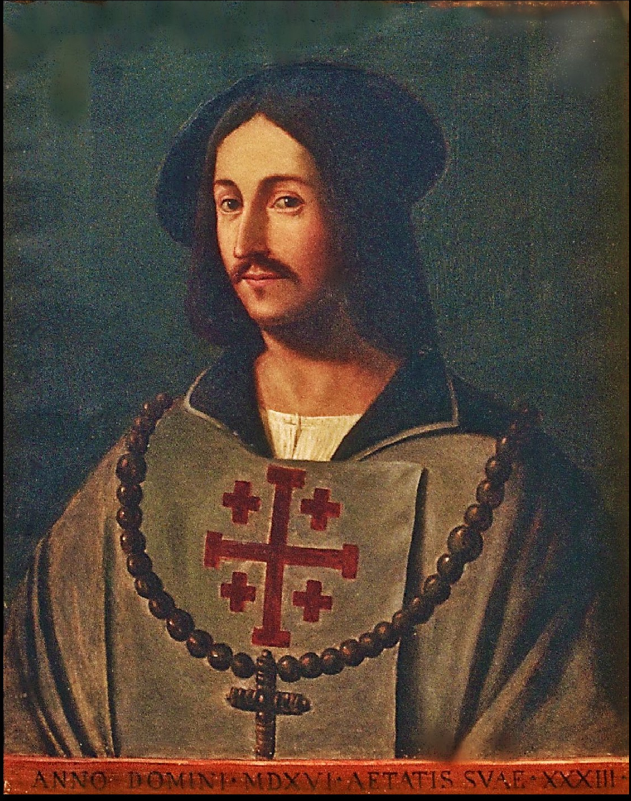

Prince of Ferrara
- Born: 1216; Ferrara
- Died: April 16, 1249 (aged 32–33); Broni, Lombardy
- Venerated in: Roman Catholicism
- Canonized: 1609 by Pope Paul V
- Major shrine: Saint Peter Minor Basilica, Broni
- Feast: April 16
- Attributes: clothed as a pilgrim heading to Santiago of Compostella, sometimes with a scepter and crown at his feet.
- Patronage: Broni, House of Este, Order of the Eagle of Este

Contardo of Este was the posthumous son of Aldobrandino I of Este, marquis of Ferrara. He was born in 1216 in Ferrara.

He renounced to his wealth and position of crown prince of Ferrara to become a simple "God's man" and started on a pilgrimage to Santiago de Compostela.

In 1235, King Andrew II of Hungary names Contardo: "Milites Sancti Sepulcri" ( Knight of the Holy Sepulchre ), by virtue of the characteristics of the sub-feudation with the Kingdom of Jerusalem; in feudalism it was common practice for the rulers to confer the title of knight on their best men.

He fell ill in Broni (Province of Pavia, Lombardy, Italy) and died there. His body was first buried on the hill where he died. Miracles were reported on his grave : severely sick people were cured.

The body was later transferred to the Saint Peter parish church (which later became a Minor basilica) in Broni. Two relics are in "Saint Biagio church (Saint Blaise) in Modena.

His cult was approved in 1609 by Pope Paul V (papacy 1605–1621) on the request of Claudio Rangoni, bishop of Piacenza (1596–1619), native of Modena, and indulgences were linked to it by Pope Urban VIII (papacy 1623–1644)

== Patron ==
He is patron to :

- the city of Broni
- the House of Este
- the Order of the Eagle of Este. Saint Contardo is featured on the decoration of the Order.

He is co-patron of :

- the city of Modena with Saint Homobonus since 1698 (Main patron is Saint Geminianus)

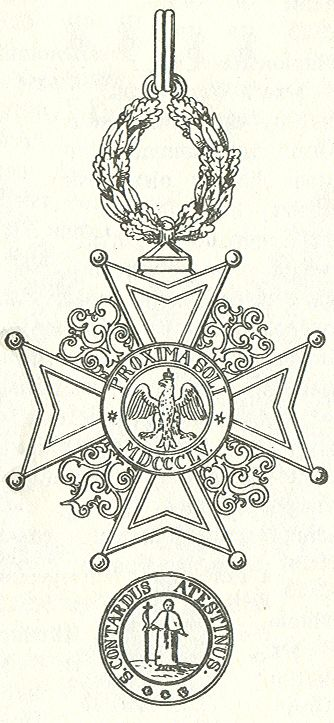

== See also ==
- House of Este
- Chronological list of saints and blesseds in the 13th century
