= Saint Albert =

Saint Albert or St. Albert (earlier forms Adelbert, Adalbert, Adalbero, Adalbéron) may refer to:

== People ==
- Saint Æthelberht of Kent (died 616), Anglo-Saxon king of Kent, first English king to embrace Christianity
- Saint Adalbert of Egmond (died 740), English missionary and possibly abbot – also known as Adelbert of Egmond
- Saint Albert of Cashel (died 800), English laborer in Ireland and Bavaria
- Saint Adalbert (Archbishop of Magdeburg) (c. 910–981), possibly Alsatian monk, missionary, abbot and Archbishop of Magdeburg – also known as Albert of Magdeburg and Apostle of the Slavs
- Saint Adalbéron I de Verdun (d. 1005), French monk, Bishop of Verdun and Bishop of Metz; founder of Cluniac monasteries – also known as Adalbero
- Saint Adalbert of Prague (c.956–997), Bohemian Bishop of Prague, hermit, missionary and martyr – also known as Albert of Prague
- Blessed Adalbero of Würzburg (c. 1010–1090), Austrian Bishop of Würzburg and Count of Lambach-Wels; joint founder of Zwiefalten Abbey
- Saint Albert of Montecorvino (d. 1127), Norman Bishop of Montecorvino
- Saint Albert of Chiatina (1135–1202), Italian archpriest – also known as Alberto di Colle
- Blessed Albert Avogadro (1149–1214), Italian canon lawyer, Bishop of Bobbio, Bishop of Vercelli and Latin Patriarch of Jerusalem; author of the Carmelite Rule of St. Albert – also known as Saint Albert of Jerusalem
- Saint Albert of Louvain (1166–1192), Brabantine Prince-Bishop of Liège – also known as Albert of Leuven
- Saint Albert of Genoa (died 1239), Italian lay brother and hermit – also known as Lambert of Genoa
- Saint Albertus Magnus (c. 1193–1280), German friar, bishop and Doctor of the Church – also known as Albert the Great and Albert of Cologne
- Saint Albert of Trapani (c. 1240–1307), Sicilian priest – also known as Albert of Sicily and Alberto degli Abbati
- Saint Albert Chmielowski (1845–1916), Polish founder of the Albertine Brothers – also known as Adam Chmielowski, Brat Albert (Brother Albert), Brother of Our Lord, Brother of Our God, and Our God's Brother

== Places ==
- St. Albert, Alberta
  - St. Albert (federal electoral district)
  - St. Albert (provincial electoral district)
  - St. Albert Trail
- St. Albert, Ontario

== See also ==
- St. Aloysius on the Ohio, also known as "St. Al's"
