= Pete "El Conde" Rodríguez =

Puerto Rican musician

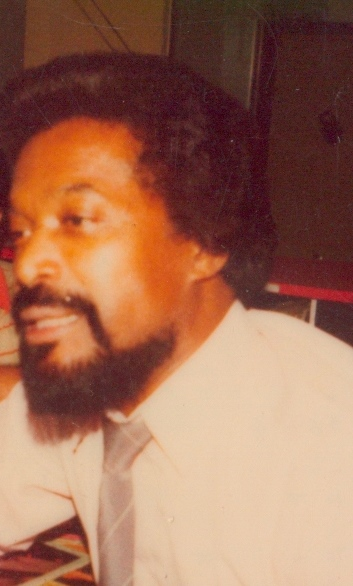
- Pete "El Conde" Rodríguez

Background information
- Also known as: "El Conde"
- Born: Pedro Juan Rodríguez Ferrer; January 31, 1933; Ponce, Puerto Rico
- Died: December 1, 2000 (aged 67) Bronx, New York, United States
- Genres: Salsa; guaguancó; son montuno
- Occupation: Musician
- Years active: 1963–2000
- Labels: Alegre; Tico; Fania; Columbia
- Formerly of: Fania All-Stars; Johnny Pacheco; Adalberto Santiago; Tito Puente; Celia Cruz
- Military service
- Allegiance: United States
- Branch: United States Army
- Service years: 1953–1956

Pedro Juan Rodríguez Ferrer (January 31, 1933 – December 1, 2000), better known as Pete "El Conde" Rodríguez, was a Puerto Rican salsa singer born in Barrio Cantera, Ponce, Puerto Rico. His son, also named Pete Rodriguez, is also a salsa and jazz musician. His daughter, Cita Rodriguez, is also an accomplished salsa singer.

== Early career ==
Rodríguez was a percussionist who started playing bongos at the age of five in his father's quartet El Conjunto Gondolero. After his father's death, at age 12 he moved to The Bronx, New York, during the 1950s. He graduated from Patrick Henry High School and from The New York School of Printing. He worked as a printer however was denied membership in the printer’s union, "which was notorious for its discriminatory practices denied him membership." In 1953 he was drafted into the U.S. Army. From 1953 to 1956, Rodriguez served as a paratrooper in Fort Benning, Georgia, and Fort Bragg, North Carolina during Jim Crow segregation. After returning to New York, he performed with La Oriental Cubana, Los Jovenes Estrella de Cuba, and Hector Ceno’s La Novel. While singing and playing the congas in a Bronx Club Los Panchos, he was spotted by the bandleader Johnny Pacheco. His first album was titled Suavito, which was released in 1963.

Just a year later in 1964, Pacheco and his lawyer Jerry Masucci founded The Fania All-Stars, a combination of the best Latin singers and musicians at that time. Rodríguez's first album under the Fania label was Canonazo. Between 1964 and 1973, Rodriguez and Pacheco recorded seven albums including La Perfecta Combinacion (1970), Los Compadres (1971), and Tres De Cafe Y Dos De Azucar (1973).

In 1974, Rodríguez left the Fania All-Stars and concentrated on a successful solo career. His solo debut album El Conde (1974) was an award winner. His 1976 album Este Negro Si Es Sabroso, was rated ninth in best Salsa records at that time. That album featured one of his most popular songs, "Catalina La O." Effected by the discrimination he faced during his career, "Rodriguez recorded songs of freedom throughout salsa’s biggest decade, including “La Abolición”(“The Abolition”) in 1976 [written by Tite Curet Alonso], invoking the systemic conditions of Black oppression in the aftermath of emancipation in the Caribbean and Latin America."

== Later career ==
During the 1980s, with the Fania All-Stars on the verge of disbanding, Rodriguez reunited with Johnny Pacheco and recorded four more albums between 1983 and 1989. Their 1987 album Salsobita was nominated for a Grammy Award. By 1990, he went solo again.

Rodríguez only recorded two albums in the 1990s with one of his hit songs "Esos Tus Ojos Negros" being released in 1993. By 2000, he was hired by Tito Puente to provide lead vocals for a tribute to the late bolero singer Benny Moré. However, the album was released posthumously because Puente died on 31 May 2000. Rodriguez also had a heart ailment, but he refused to undergo bypass surgery as Puente did. On 2 December 2000, Rodriguez suffered a heart attack and died at the age of 67. He was buried at the Puerto Rico National Cemetery in Bayamón, Puerto Rico.

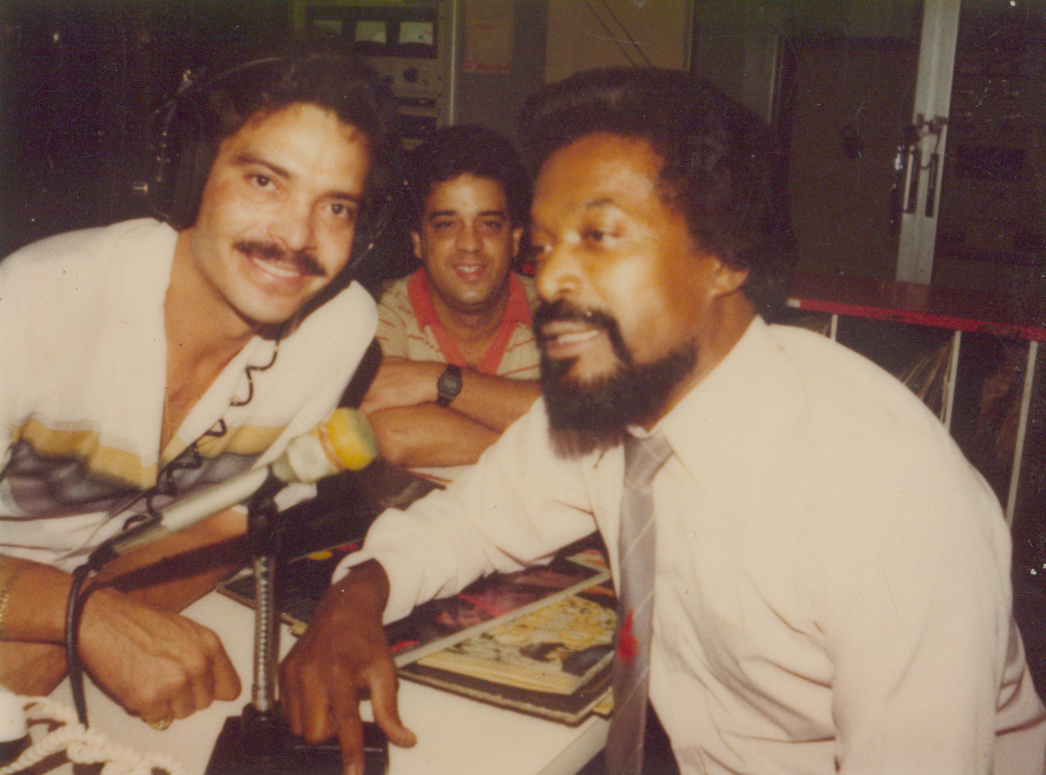
Salsa DJ Yun Yun Echevarría (left) and Pete "El Conde" Rodríguez at Radio Voz WVOZ Puerto Rico (1980s)

== Discography ==
- Sua' vito (1963)
- Cañonazo (1964)
- Swing (Con El Conjunto Sensacion) (1965)
- Sabor Típico (1967)
- La Perfecta Combinación (1970)
- Los Compadres (1971)
- Tres de Café y Dos de Azúcar (1973)
- El Conde (1974)
- Este Negro Si Es Sabroso (1976)
- A Touch of Class (1978)
- Soy la Ley (1979)
- Celia, Johnny and Pete (1980)
- Fiesta Con "El Conde" (1982)
- Salsobita (1987)
- El Rey (1990)
- Generaciones (1993)
- Pete & Papo (1996)
- 35 Aniversario En Vivo! En El Teatro La Perla En Ponce P.R (1996)

== Filmography ==
- Our Latin Thing (Fania 1972)
- Salsa (Fania, 1974)
- Celia cruz and the Fania All Stars In Africa (Fania, 1993)
- Live (Fania, 1995)
- Soul Power (2009)

== Movie soundtracks ==
- Piñero (2001)
- El Cantante (2006)

== See also ==
- Guaguancó
- Son cubano
- Salsa
- Afro-Cuban jazz
