= Paul and Ninety Companions =

Saints Paul and Ninety Companions

Martyrs
- Born: various Hungary
- Died: 1240; Wallachia, Hungary
- Venerated in: Roman Catholic Church
- Feast: 10 February

Paul and his companions (died 1240) were Dominican martyrs. Hungarian by birth, Paul went on to study law at the University of Bologna, and was persuaded by St. Dominic, to his order of Friars Preachers. Paul would later return to his native Hungary, to establish the Dominican Order there. The group were met with much animosity, especially by the Cumans, at Wallachia, where they were slaughtered by the locals.
