= Pete Rodriguez (jazz musician) =

American jazz musician

- Born: August 2, 1969 (age 56)
- Genres: Jazz; salsa
- Instruments: Trumpet; vocals; percussion
- Years active: 1984–present
- Website: peterodriguezmusic.com

Pete Rodriguez (born August 2, 1969) plays jazz trumpet and is a composer, vocalist, and percussionist. The reviewer Brian Zimmerman, in a review of the El Conde Negro album, wrote in 2015 that "Rodriguez is not only an attentive student of the Latin jazz tradition, but also one of the talented young artists who will usher it into the future".

== Biography ==
Raised in Bronx, New York. Rodriguez is a jazz trumpeter and vocalist who is now based in Austin, Texas. Son of salsa musician, Pete "El Conde" Rodriguez. He has performed with Celia Cruz and appears on the Tito Puente’s album Mambo Birdland, which won the Latin Grammy Award for Best Traditional Tropical Album in 2000. As a leader, his recent festival performances include the IX Festival De Jazz at the Conservatorio De Musica De Puerto Rico, and with his quintet, which included Luis Perdomo (pianist), drummer Rudy Royston, saxophonist Gil Del Bosque, and bassist Ricky Rodriguez, at the 2014 Festival de Jazz de Chihuahua.

== Discography ==
- 1999 Mambo Birdland [RMM Records & Video]
- 2014 Caminado con Papi Destiny Records DR-0001
- 2015 El Conde Negro Destiny Records DR-0004
