= Fazzio =

Saint Fazzio
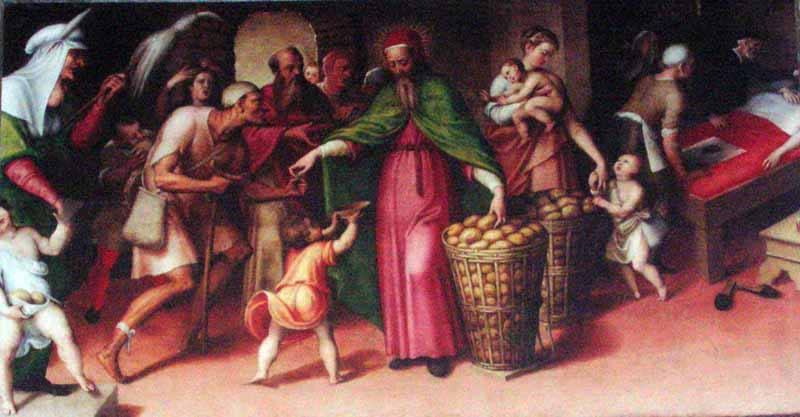
- Born: 1190; Verona, Italy
- Died: 1272
- Venerated in: Roman Catholic Church
- Feast: 18 January

Fazzio (Fatius, Fazius, Facius) of Verona (1190–1272) was an Italian saint. A native of Verona, he was a goldsmith who founded a charitable society in Cremona which worked with pilgrims and the sick. It was called the Order of the Holy Spirit. He made pilgrimages on foot to Rome and to Santiago de Compostela.
