= El Conde =

Archeological site in Naucalpan, Mexico

El Conde archaeological site
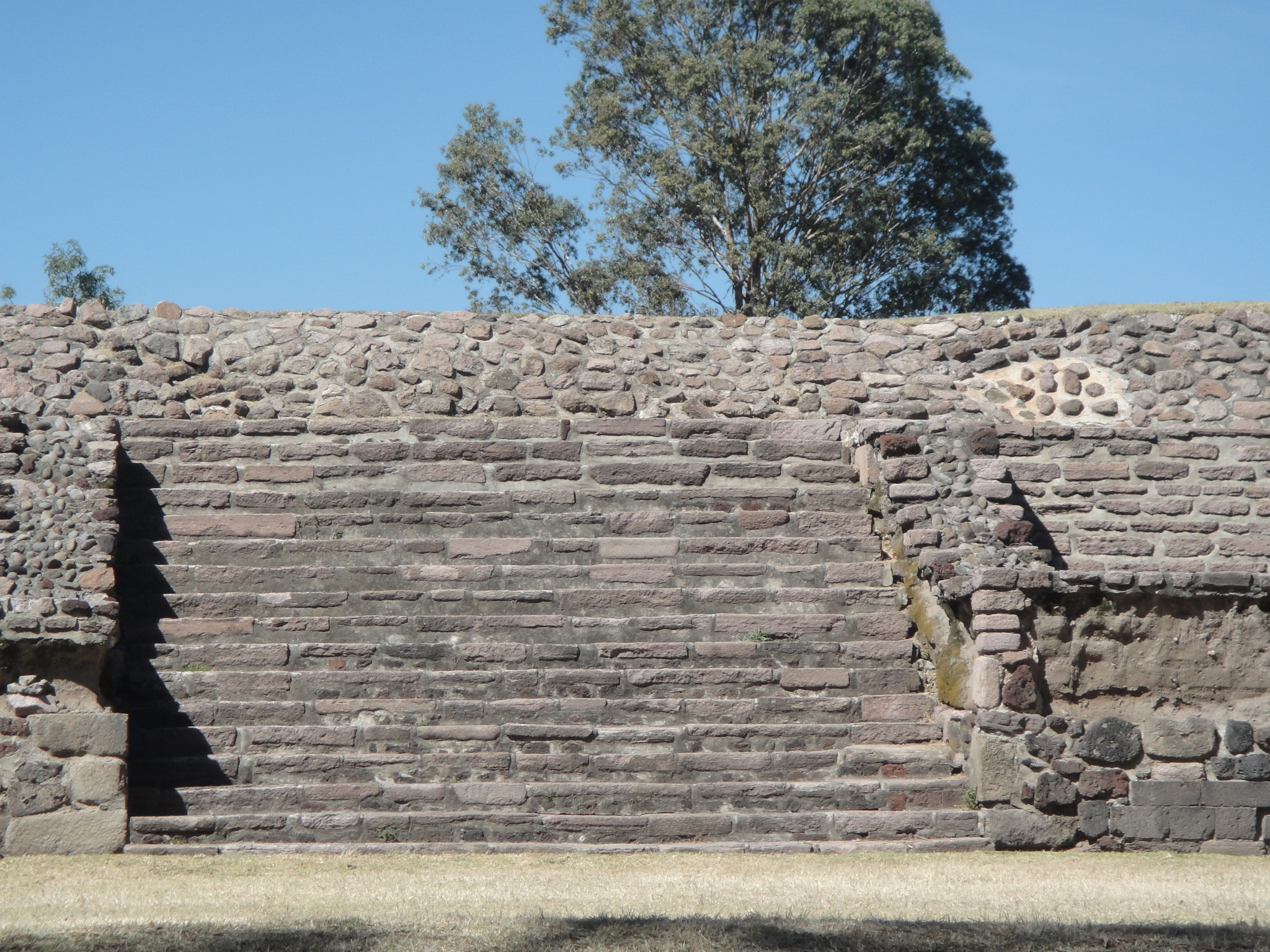
- El Conde front stairway
- Interactive map of El Conde archaeological site
- 19°28′14″N 99°13′51″W
- Type: Archaeology
- Periods: Postclassical
- Cultures: Tepanec or Tlahuica, Chichimeca
- Location: Naucalpan municipality, México State, Mexico
- Region: Mesoamerica, Valley of Mexico

History
- Built: 1400 BCE – 1521 CE

Site notes
- Website: El Conde archaeological site

El Conde is an archeological site located at Ozumba Street, El Conde, three block north the Mayo 1 Ave., in the municipality of Naucalpan, Mexico State.

The site was formally declared a prehispanic historical monument on December 28, 2001.

== History ==
The Valley of Mexico, of which Naucalpan is part of, was inhabited by humans for over 20,000 years.

Naucalpan's history begins with a group from the Tlatilco culture It settled the banks of the “Río Hondo” between 1700 and 600 BCE, in the area of the current Naucalpan municipality.

Tlatilco archaeological evidence reveal the social development of that culture, prior to the Teotihuacan, Toltec, Chichimeca, and certainly the Aztec. In the Mesoamerican Preclassical period (1300 to 1400 BCE), an Olmec group arrived and had a significant influence on the Tlatilca domain. Later, the Tlatilca were also heavily influenced by the Teotihuacan civilization. Between 1000 and 1200 CE, the Chichimeca conquered the Tlatilca and deposed their monarchy. The pyramid of El Conde was built during this time, located in what is now the El Conde neighborhood.

Subsequently, the area was ruled by Tlacopan and ethnically came to be dominated by the Otomies. As of 1428 CE, the area was under Tepanec from Azcapotzalco domain, which was later conquered by the Triple Alliance, who named them Naucalpan.

== Cultures influencing El Conde ==
Naucalpan is a Nahuatl name; some authors interpret its meaning as "the place of the four quarters" or "in the four quarters", but according to the etymological roots means "in four houses". Phonetic components are: Nau, grammatical contraction of nahui, means "four"; "cal derived calli, which means "House" and not "quarter" and pan, it should be interpreted, in this case, as "on" or "place": "in four houses" or “place of four houses".

=== Tlatilco Culture ===
The Tlatilca civilization –as called by later Nahuatl speaking groups- was a high population center in the early Preclassical period. The Tlatilco population reached the lands of current Naucalpan between 1700 and 600 BCE. Around 1400 BCE, the área had a large influence and presence of Otomí groups, and was called Otocampulco (Place of the Otomi).

In Naucalpan, ancient “tlatilquenses” from the “Cerro Tepalcate” were attracted by the Teotihuacan development stream.

=== Chichimec Culture ===
It arrived at the place between 1000 and 1200 CE, and settled near where the Aztecs would later build (Postclassical) the structure known today as El Conde.

=== Tepanec Culture ===
In 1428 the territory was claimed by Azcapotzalco tepanecs, but after being defeated by the Triple Alliance (Mexico), the territory was ceded to the Tlacopan Altepetl, who later called the place Tacuba.

== The Site ==
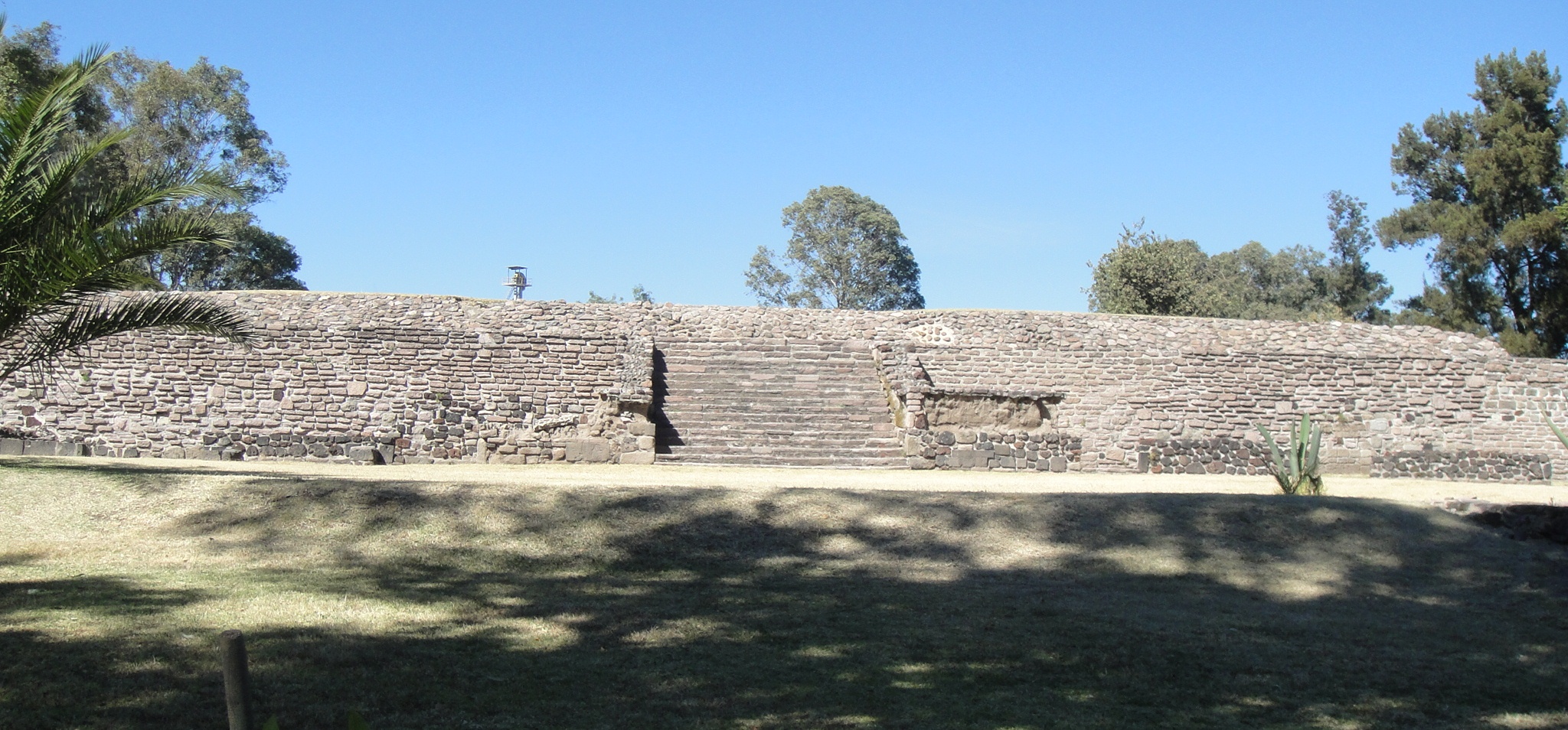
El Conde - main structure

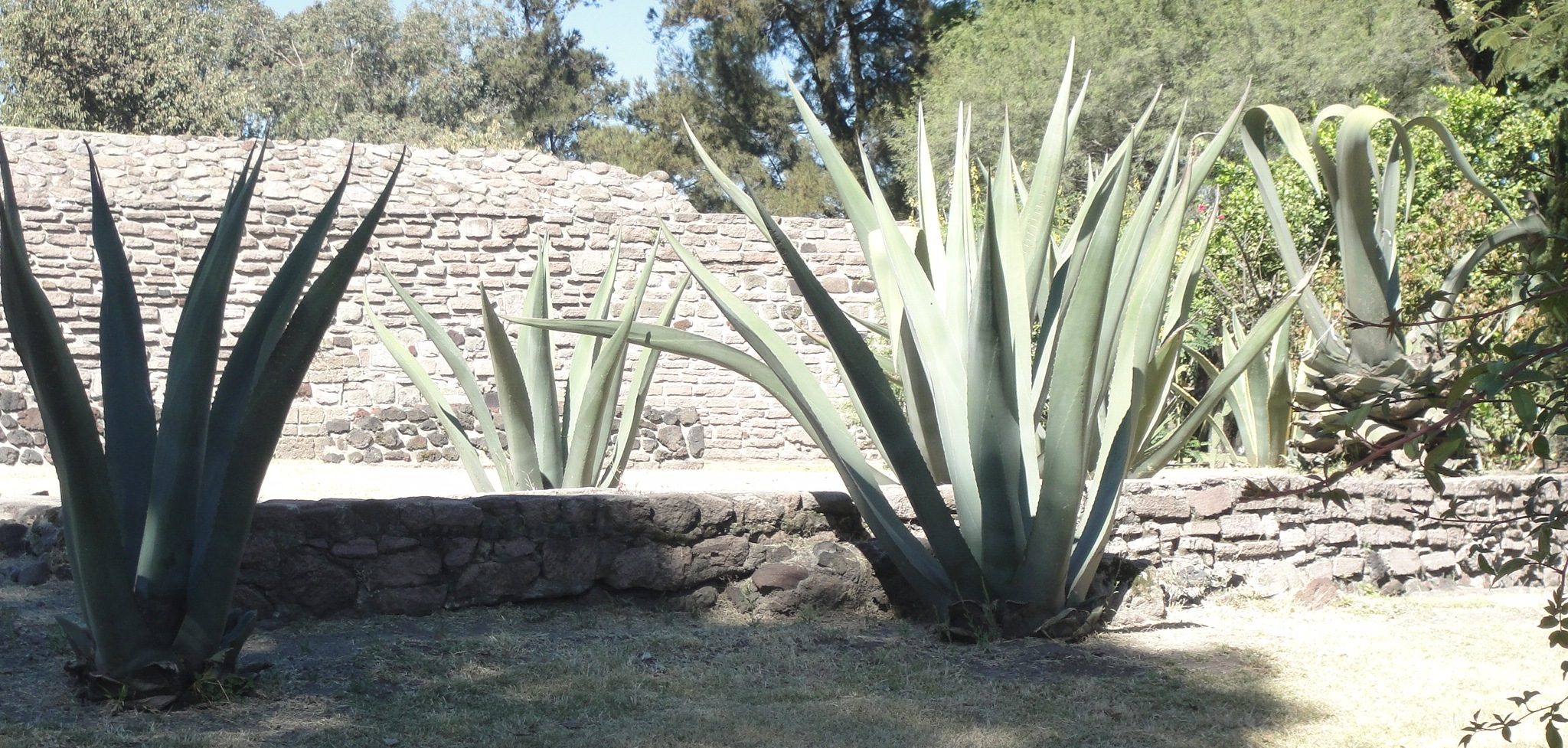
El Conde – external foundations

The original name is unknown, El Conde retains this name since the 19th century, when a person by the name Manuel Conde lived atop the hill, so the place is known since as " Cerrito El Conde".

The site was discovered in 1907 by archaeologist Manuel Gamio, and established that the site was constructed during the Postclassical Period.

The El Conde pyramid, is an over 2,00m sq.mt., structure.

The archaeological site comprises a rectangular platform, during prehispanic times a tecpan or nobility Palace was built. Apparently, the structure corresponds to Aztec phase III.

The structure is one of the last examples of civil architecture from the late Postclassical. The front is a stairway and some embedded rooms that apparently at that time were very common for this type of buildings. Its layout is similar to those drawn in codices as the Quinantzin map, showing the Netzahualcoyotl Palace.

The tecpan was one of the most important buildings on mesoamerican communities, because they served as government seats, where administrative activities and meetings of local councils took place, where political decisions were taken.
