= Thomas of Dover =

13th-century English martyr and saint

Thomas of Dover (died 1295) was a Roman Catholic monk who was sainted for martyrdom.

On 2 or 5 August 1295, a French raiding party attacked the Benedictine Dover Priory in Dover, England. The only person the raiders found there was an old sick monk named Thomas Hales (or de Halys).

The French killed Hales when he refused to reveal the hiding place of the priory valuables.

== Bibliography ==
- Mark Turnham Elvins, "St. Thomas of Dover: monk and martyr" (London: Buckland, 1994)
