= Sant'Antonio in Polesine =

Coordinates: 44°49′36″N 11°37′28″E

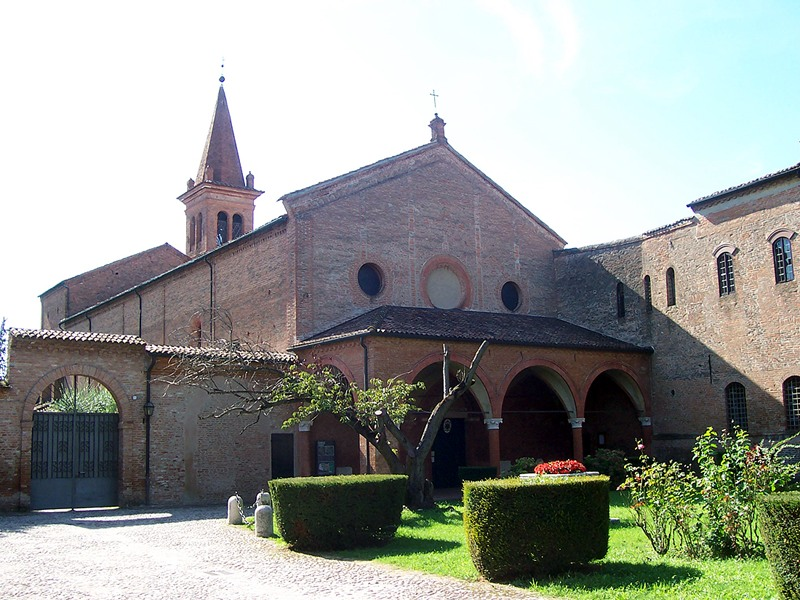
S Antonio In Polesine

Sant'Antonio in Polesine is a Catholic monastic complex of the Order of Saint Benedict nuns located in Ferrara, Italy and dedicated to Anthony the Great. Administratively, it is part of the deanery of Ferrara, part of the Archdiocese of Ferrara-Comacchio.

== History ==
The name "in Polesine" does not refer to the area of Polesine, but to its original situation, high ground surrounded by water. The monastery, founded in the early Middle Ages by Augustinians hermits, stood on an island in the middle of the Po River.

Beatrice II d’Este, daughter of marquis Azzo Novello and a Benedictine nun, received the monastery from her father as a gift for her community. Around 1257, Beatrice moved into the convent, where she died in 1264 to be beatified in 1270. Since then, the monastery has been under the patronage of the House of Este.

== Buildings ==
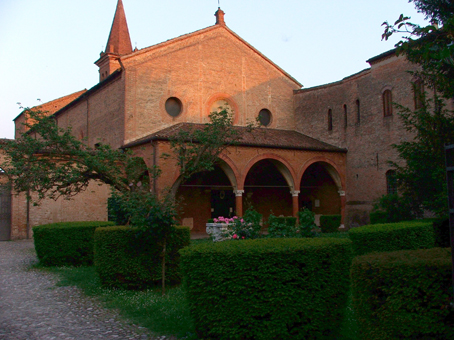
Sant'Antonio Abate in Polesine (Ferrara)

Only the convent church is open to the public. The church is in baroque style, with a 17th-century frescoed ceiling by Francesco Ferrari.

The nuns' church has side chapels with frescoes of the school of Giotto—on the left, Storie dell'infanzia di Gesù e della Vita della Vergine done between 1315 and 1320. On the right is Storie della Passione—and a central chapel with frescoes of multiple periods, including an Annunciazione of Domenico Panetti (15th century) and a ceiling with 16th-century grotesques. The presence of pagan images in an ecclesiastical setting, bears witness to the close ties between the monastery and the court, where such decorations were fashionable in the late 1600s. There is also a sculpted and gilt altarpiece depicting the Flagellazione by Nicolò Roselli (16th century).

The complex also includes a cloister and a monumental tomb of the founder, Beatrice.
