= Saint Beatrice d'Este =

Italian Roman Catholic saint

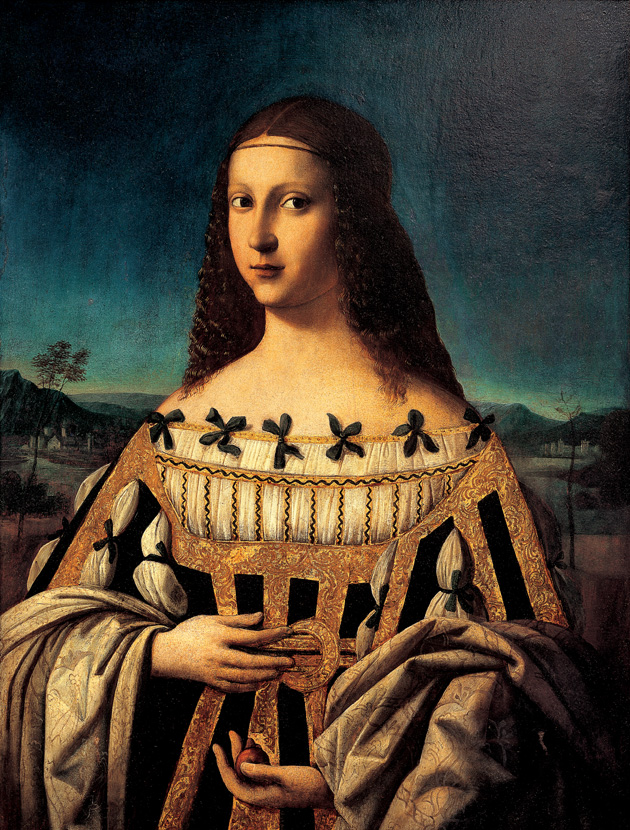
- Beatrice d'Este by Bartolomeo Veneto, 1510 (Snite Museum of Art)

Saint
- Born: 1230; Calaone (nowadays a Baone's hamlet, Padua, Italy)
- Died: 18 January 1262
- Venerated in: Roman Catholic Church
- Beatified: 16 July 1774 by Pope Clement XIV
- Feast: 19 January

Saint Beatrix II d'Este (1230 – 18 January 1262) belonged to a family of the Norman Dukes of Apulia and was herself the daughter of the Marquis of Ferrara; she was also a niece of the Blessed Beatrice d'Este, hence being named after her. She was betrothed to Galeazzo Manfredi of Vicenza but he succumbed due to his wounds after a battle, just before their wedding day. Beatrice refused to return home, but attended by some of her maidens, devoted herself to the service of God, following the Benedictine rule, at the convent of Sant'Antonio in Polesine, at San Lazzaro just outside of Ferrara. Her cult was approved by Clement XIV, and Pius VI allowed her festival to be kept on 19 January.

== Bibliography ==
- Faustino Mostardi, La Beata Beatrice II d'Este, Venice, Fondazione Cini, 1963
- Bibliotheca Sanctorum, Beatrice, Praglia Abbey (Padua – Italy) vol. II ag 994, 1962
- Sautto Alfonso, Le tre Beatrici d’Este, Associazione Cattolica di Cultura, 1933, Monastero di Sant’Antonio di Ferrara, Italy

== See also ==
- List of Catholic saints
