= Gerold of Cologne =

Saint Gerold of Cologne

Martyr
- Born: 1201; Cologne, Germany
- Died: 1251; Cremona, Italy
- Venerated in: Roman Catholic Church
- Feast: 7 October

Gerold of Cologne was a German pilgrim, who was attacked by robbers, who later murdered him, at Cremona, Italy, in 1251, on his return from a pilgrimage.
