= Peter Rodriguez and companions =

Seven Spanish Knights of Santiago, martyred by Moors

Saints Peter Rodriguez and companions

Martyrs
- Born: Spain
- Died: 1242
- Venerated in: Roman Catholic Church
- Feast: 11 June

Peter Rodriguez and Companions were a group of 7 Spanish martyrs, who were members of the Knights of Santiago of Portugal. They were captured by Moors and martyred.
