= Blessed Beatrice d'Este =

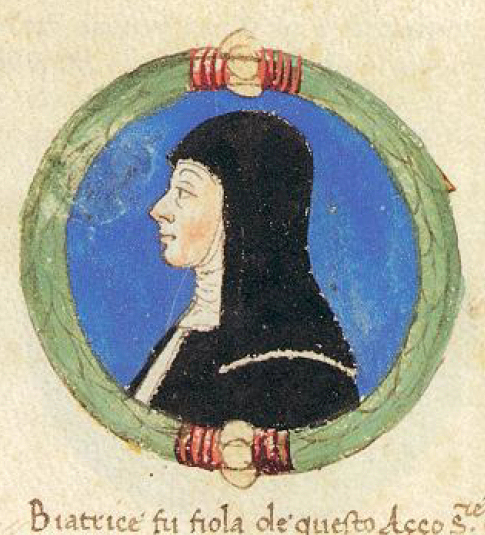
- Beatrice d'Este in the Genealogia dei principi d'Este (1470s)

Benedictine nun
- Born: 1192; Castello Estense, Ferrara
- Died: 10 May 1226
- Venerated in: Catholic Church
- Feast: 10 May

Blessed Beatrice d'Este (Occitan: Biatritz or Beatritz d'Est) (1192 – 10 May 1226) was the daughter of Azzo VI of the Este family by his second wife, Sophia Eleanor, daughter of Humbert III, Count of Savoy. She was the aunt of Saint Beatrice d'Este.

== Life ==
An account of her life was written, in both medieval Latin and the Italian vernacular, by a Brother Alberto of the church of the Holy Spirit (S. Spirito). This text was unknown for centuries, until it was rediscovered by the historian Giovanni Brunacci in the eighteenth century in an “old Ferrarese codex."

Beatrice was born at the Castello Estense, the seat of her family's power. About her youth Alberto wrote:

Passoe li anni de la sua adolescentia in pompe et fauori del seculo: in delitte de la sua carne, in ornamenti et uanitate de diuerse facte come è usanza di nobile femina et seculare.	She passed the years of her adolescence in the pomp and appearances of the age: in delights of the flesh, in ornamentation and vanity of diverse fabrication, as is typical of noble, secular women.

She became the object of the courtly love of Rambertino Buvalelli, a Bolognese troubadour who traveled widely in northern Italy. In nine of his cansos Rambertino celebrates the beauty and character of Beatrice, whom he frequently calls by the senhal (a "sign", as in a nickname) Mon Restaur ("My Refreshment" in Occitan). The relationship between Rambertino and the young Beatrice was purely poetic, lyric, and musical.

Beatrice became a Benedictine nun at Solarola near Padua at the age of fourteen, and in 1221 founded a religious house at the site of an abandoned monastery in Gemmola, formerly inhabited by hermits. In the 17th century it was turned into villa by a Venetian merchant. Today the Villa Beatrice d'Este houses a nature museum.

== Sant'Antonio in Polesine ==
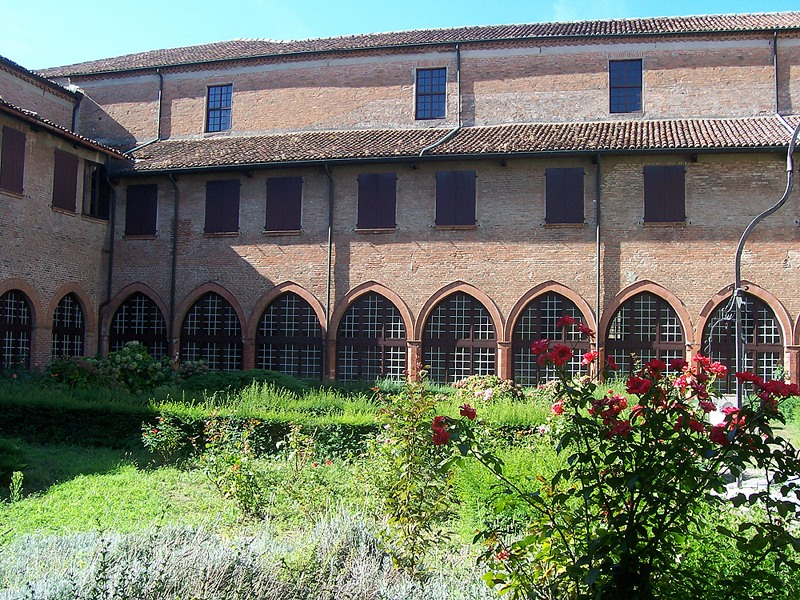
Cloister of Sant'Antonio in Polesine

The name "in Polesine" does not refer to the area of Polesine, but to its original situation, high ground surrounded by water. The original monastery, founded in the early Middle Ages by Augustinians hermits, stood on an island in the middle of the Po River.

Beatrice received the monastery from her father as a gift for her community. She moved into the convent, where she died in 1226.

Her body was removed to Padua for burial in Santa Sofia. Subsequently, her remains were returned to the cloister chapel of the Monastery of Sant'Antonio in Polesine which she founded. Her cultus was approved for Roman Catholics on 19 November 1763 by Pope Clement XIII and her feast is May 10.

== Sources ==
- Bertoni, Giulio. I Trovatori d'Italia: Biografie, testi, tradizioni, note. Rome: Società Multigrafica Editrice Somu, 1967 [1915].
- Field, W. H. W. Review of Le poesie by Rambertino Buvalelli, ed. Elio Melli. In Speculum, 56:2 (Apr., 1981), pp. 362–366.
