= Beatrice d'Este, Queen of Hungary =

Beatrice d'Este
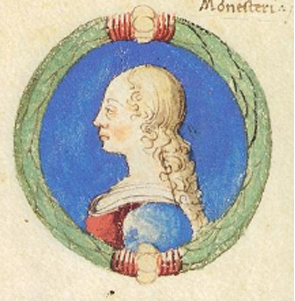
- Depicted in the Genealogia dei principi d'Este (c. 1476)

Queen consort of Hungary
- Tenure: c. 1234–1235
- Born: 1215
- Died: before 8 May 1245
- Spouse: Andrew II of Hungary
- Issue: Stephen, Duke of Slavonia
- House: House of Este
- Father: Aldobrandino I of Este

Beatrice d'Este (1215 – before 8 May 1245) was Queen consort of Hungary as the third wife of King Andrew II of Hungary.

Beatrice was the only child of Marquis Aldobrandino I d'Este but her mother's name and origin are unknown. Since her father died in the year of her birth, she was educated by her uncle, Marquis Azzo VII d'Este.

In the beginning of 1234, the elderly King Andrew II of Hungary, who had been widowed for the second time in 1233, visited the court of the Este family and fell in love with the young Beatrice. Her uncle gave his consent to the marriage only on the condition that both King Andrew and Beatrice renounced the dowry and any claim of her father's inheritance.

Their marriage was celebrated on 14 May 1234 in Székesfehérvár, and King Andrew promised in their conjugal contract that he would grant 5,000 pounds as marriage portion to Beatrice, who would also receive 1,000 pounds as her annual revenue. However, the relationship between Beatrice and her husband's sons became tense soon.

Following her husband's death on 21 September 1235, her stepson, King Béla IV of Hungary ascended the throne and he wanted to banish Beatrice from Hungary. Moreover, when the widowed Beatrice announced that she was pregnant, her stepson accused her of adultery with Denis, son of Ampud, his father's powerful royal advisor, and ordered her arrest. Beatrice could escape from Hungary only with the assistance of the ambassadors of Frederick II, Holy Roman Emperor who had arrived to the deceased king's funeral.

She went to the Holy Roman Empire, where she bore her husband's posthumous son, Stephen whose legitimacy, however, was never acknowledged by his brothers. Following the birth of her child, Beatrice was planning to live in the court of his uncle, but Marquis Azzo VII denied her request.

She spent the following years wandering in Italy, and she never gave up her son's claims to receive ducal revenues from Hungary. She tried to persuade the Republic of Venice to support her son during the war with Hungary, but the Serenissima promised King Béla IV that it would not support Beatrice and her son in the peace of 30 June 1244.

== Marriage and child ==
She married on 14 May 1234 to King Andrew II of Hungary (c. 1177 – 21 September 1235) and had issue:

- Stephen the Posthumous (1236 – 10 April 1271), father of the King Andrew III of Hungary.

== Sources ==
- Soltész, István: Árpád-házi királynék (Gabo, 1999)
- Kristó, Gyula - Makk, Ferenc: Az Árpád-ház uralkodói (IPC Könyvek, 1996)

Royal titles
Preceded by Yolanda de Courtenay	Queen consort of Hungary c. 1234–1235	Succeeded by Maria Laskarina
