= Albert of Genoa =

Italian Roman Catholic saint

Saint Albert of Genoa
- Born: Genoa, Italy
- Died: 1180
- Venerated in: Roman Catholic Church
- Feast: 8 July

Albert of Genoa, also known as Lambert of Genoa, was a Cistercian hermit. Born in Genoa, Italy, Albert entered the Cistercian abbey nearby. There he remained for the rest of his life as a lay brother and a hermit.
