= Joseph Antenucci Becherer =

American curator

Joseph Antenucci Becherer (born 1965) is an American curator, professor, writer, and arts administrator. He is a scholar of modern and contemporary sculpture, organizing major exhibitions and installations from Auguste Rodin to Jonathan Borofsky, Henry Moore to Magdalena Abakanowicz, Jenny Holzer to Ai Weiwei.

He is the director of the Raclin Murphy Museum of Art at the University of Notre Dame. Concurrently, he is a professor of art history in the university's department of Art, Art History and Design. Formerly, he was the chief curator and vice president of Frederik Meijer Gardens & Sculpture Park in Grand Rapids, Michigan, where he directed the departments of Sculpture and Sculpture Exhibitions, Horticulture and Annual Exhibitions, Communications and Public Relations. Additionally, Becherer served as the Lena Meijer Professor in the History of Art at Aquinas College, where he taught courses in Renaissance, Baroque, and Contemporary Art.

== Early life ==
Becherer was born in Canton, Ohio, to Joseph and Joanne Becherer and attended Catholic schools. He uses the name Antenucci in honor of his maternal grandmother, Rose Antenucci. At Canton Central Catholic he developed a serious interest in art and literature.

He attended Ohio University on scholarship and received a BFA and an MFA in art history with minors in English literature and studio art. For several semesters he studied in Rome, Florence and London. A seminar on Donatello opened his interest in three-dimensional forms. His mentor was Marilyn Bradshaw PhD, a Renaissance scholar, but he wrote his thesis on the modern painter and printmaker, Georges Rouault.

After initial teaching assignments and museum work, he enrolled at Indiana University, Bloomington. He completed his PhD under the direction of Bruce Cole, distinguished professor and later chairman of the National Endowment for the Humanities. His dissertation focused on Pietro Perugino and the foundations of American collecting.

== Career ==
Following a period of teaching at Ohio University as a sabbatical replacement, Becherer moved to Grand Rapids, Michigan. During the 1991–1992 academic year he developed an art history program for Grand Rapids Community College, and successively served as department chair, Assistant Dean and then Dean of Arts, Liberal Arts and Social Sciences leading more than 120 faculty. Simultaneous, he did consultation work for Prentice-Hall publishing and the Grand Rapids Art Museum. For the later he organized the landmark exhibition, “Pietro Perugino: Master of the Italian Renaissance” in 1997-1998 – the first of its kind anywhere in the world.

After a period of consulting work, Becherer officially joined Frederik Meijer Gardens & Sculpture Park in 1999. The organization was only four years old when he became the founding director and curator of the now internationally renowned sculpture program helping to realize the vision of retail magnate and philanthropist, Frederik Meijer. Becherer also began teaching upper divisions classes at Aquinas College.

At Meijer Gardens, Becherer developed a permanent collection opening in the late 19th century with iconic works by Auguste Rodin, Aristide Maillol, Jacques Lipchitz and Joan Miró, to Louise Nevelson and Barbara Hepworth, Mark di Suvero, Hanneke Beaumont and Beverly Pepper, Richard Serra and Jaume Plensa, Antony Gormley and Louise Bourgeois. In all the collection hosts more than 300 works across the campus including at 25 acre sculpture, but in concert with gardens and natural environments across the 158-acre campus. In 2015, Meijer Gardens opened the Richard and Helen DeVos Japanese Gardens designed by Hoichi Kurisu including iconic works by Anish Kapoor, Jenny Holzer, Zhang Huan and Giuseppe Penone among others. In addition, he has developed a major collection of works on paper, models and maquettes for the organization.

Thus far, Becherer has organized nearly fifty exhibitions including retrospectives for Jim Dine (sculpture), Beverly Pepper and George Segal. He has published dozens of books, catalogs, essays and articles.

Independently, he lectures and advises on projects across the country, Europe, Japan and China.

== Civic and professional projects ==
Becherer has served on numerous national and international projects including those commissioning major public works by Dennis Oppenheim and Maya Lin. In 2010–2011, he served as National Chairman of the committee to commission a sculpture of President Gerald R. Ford for the Rotunda of the US Capitol Building.

He currently serves on the Board of the Midwest Art History Society and the Ohio University Alumni Association and advisory boards to the International Sculpture Center.

== Selected exhibitions (recent and in-progress) ==
“Ai Weiwei at Meijer Gardens: Natural State”, January 27 – August 20, 2017 (with gallery guide).

“Mimmo Paladino: Present into Past”, February 26 – August 14, 2016 (with catalogue and gallery guide).

“Connected-Disconnected. The sculpture of Hanneke Beaumont”, January 2013 - April 2013.

“Jonathan Borofsky: Human Structures and the Light of Consciousness”, (with gallery guide), January – May, 2009.

“Outside In - Sculpture for the Natural World”, (with catalogue), September - October, 2004 for Carrie Secrist Gallery, Chicago.

“Color and Light: Chihuly at the Gardens”, January – May 2003.

== Personal life ==
Becherer and his wife, Lisa, have two sons and live in South Bend, Indiana.
