= Hell's Kitchen, Manhattan =

Neighborhood in New York City

Hell's Kitchen
- Neighborhood
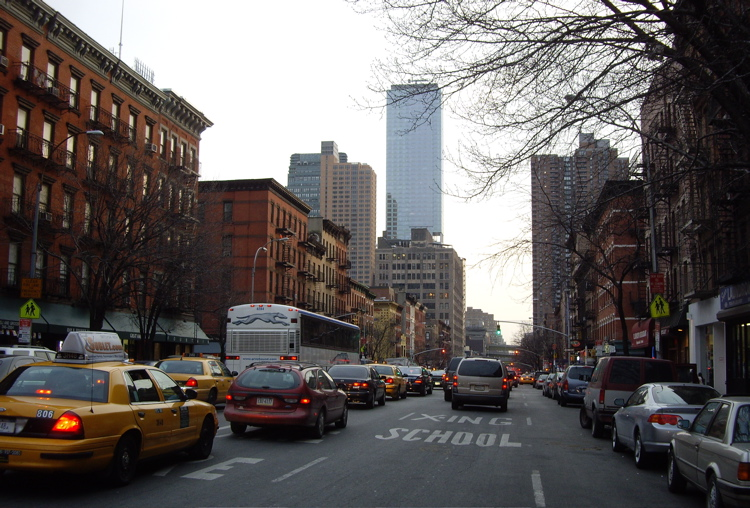
- Looking south on Ninth Avenue from 49th Street
- Nicknames: HK, Clinton
- Interactive map of Hell's Kitchen
- Coordinates: 40°45′51″N 73°59′32″W
- Country: United States
- State: New York
- City: New York City
- Borough: Manhattan
- Community District: Manhattan 4

Area
  - Total: 0.841 sq mi (2.18 km^{2})

Population (2020)
  - Total: 49,758
  - Density: 59,200/sq mi (22,800/km^{2})

Ethnicity
  - White: 56.4%
  - Asian or Pacific Islander: 15.0%
  - Hispanic: 19.3%
  - Black: 6.3%
  - Other: 3.0%

Economics
  - Median income: $98,727
- Time zone: UTC−05:00 (Eastern)
  - Summer (DST): UTC−04:00 (EDT)
- ZIP Codes: 10018, 10019, 10036
- Area code: 212, 332, 646, and 917

Hell's Kitchen—also known as Clinton, or Midtown West on real estate listings—is a neighborhood on the West Side of Midtown Manhattan in New York City, New York, United States. It is generally bordered by 34th Street (or 41st Street) to the south, 59th Street to the north, Eighth Avenue to the east, and the Hudson River to the west.

Hell's Kitchen was for many years an area in which poor and working-class Irish Americans lived. Its gritty reputation has long held real-estate prices below those of most other areas of Manhattan. By 1969, the City Planning Commission's Plan for New York City reported that development pressures related to its Midtown location were driving people of modest means from the area. Gentrification has accelerated since the early 1980s, and rents have risen rapidly.

In addition to its long-established Irish-American and Hispanic-American populations, Hell's Kitchen has a large LGBTQ population and is home to many LGBTQ bars and businesses. The neighborhood has long been a home to fledgling and working actors; it is the home of the Actors Studio training school and sits near Broadway theatres.

Hell's Kitchen is part of Manhattan Community District 4. It is patrolled by the 10th and Midtown North Precincts of the New York City Police Department. The area provides transport, medical, and warehouse-infrastructure support to the business district of Manhattan. It is known for its extensive range of multi-ethnic, small, and relatively inexpensive restaurants, delicatessens, bodegas, bars, and associated nightlife.

== Boundaries ==
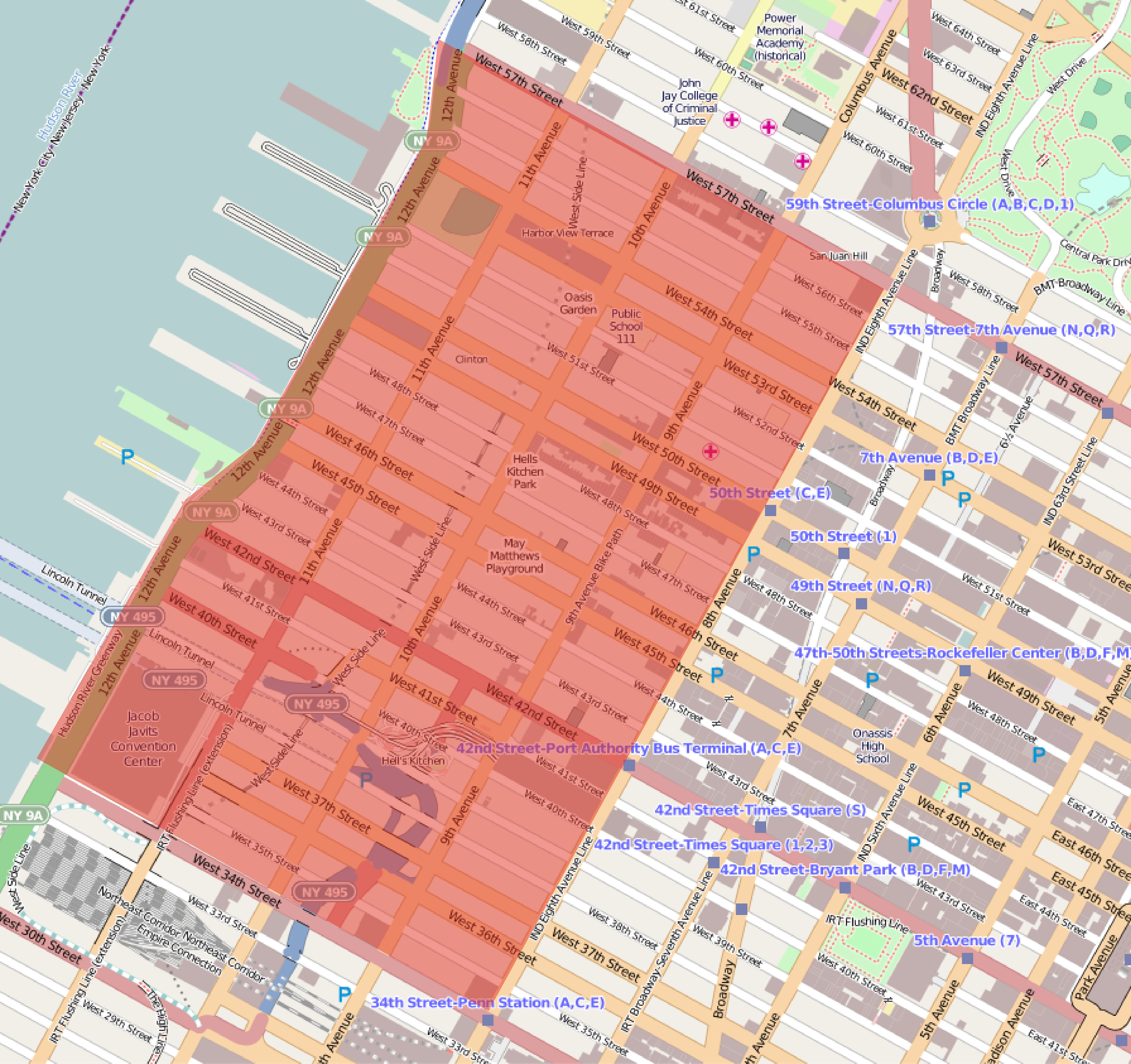
A general map of the Hell's Kitchen area, including the northern part of Hudson Yards to the south, but excluding the Columbus Circle transition area to the north

The name "Hell's Kitchen" generally refers to the area between 34th to the south and 59th Street to the north. Starting west of Eighth Avenue and the north side of 43rd Street, city zoning regulations generally limit buildings to six stories. As a result, most of the buildings are older, and are often walk-up apartments. For the most part, the neighborhood encompasses the ZIP Codes 10019 and 10036. The post office for 10019 is called Radio City Station, the original name for Rockefeller Center on Sixth Avenue.

The neighborhood overlaps Times Square and the Theater District to the east at Eighth Avenue. On its southeast border, it overlaps the Garment District also on Eighth Avenue. Two landmarks are located here – the New Yorker Hotel at 481 Eighth Avenue, and the Manhattan Center building at the northwest corner of 34th Street and Eighth Avenue. Included in the transition area on Eighth Avenue are the Port Authority Bus Terminal at 42nd Street; the Pride of Midtown fire station (from which an entire shift, 15 firefighters, died at the World Trade Center on 9/11); several theatres, including Studio 54; the original soup stand of Seinfeld's "The Soup Nazi"; and the Hearst Tower.

The northern edge of Hell's Kitchen borders the southern edge of the Upper West Side, though the section west of Ninth Avenue and south of 57th Street is also part of the Columbus Circle neighborhood. 57th Street was traditionally the boundary between the Upper West Side and Hell's Kitchen, but another interpretation puts the northern border at 59th Street, where the names of the north–south avenues change. Included between 57th and 59th Streets are the Time Warner Center at Columbus Circle; Hudson Hotel; Mount Sinai West hospital, where John Lennon died in 1980 after being shot; and John Jay College of Criminal Justice.

Beyond the southern boundary is Chelsea. The Hudson Yards neighborhood overlaps with Hell's Kitchen, and the areas are often lumped together as "West Midtown", given their proximity to the Midtown Manhattan business district. The traditional dividing line with Chelsea is 34th Street. The area between the rail corridor at Pennsylvania Station and the West Side Yard and 42nd Street, and east of the Jacob K. Javits Convention Center, is also known as Hell's Kitchen South. Part of the southern edge of Hell's Kitchen, on Ninth Avenue between 35th and 40th streets, is designated as the Paddy's Market Historic District, added to the National Register of Historic Places in 2022.

The western border of the neighborhood is the Hudson River at the Hudson River Park and West Side Highway.

== Name ==
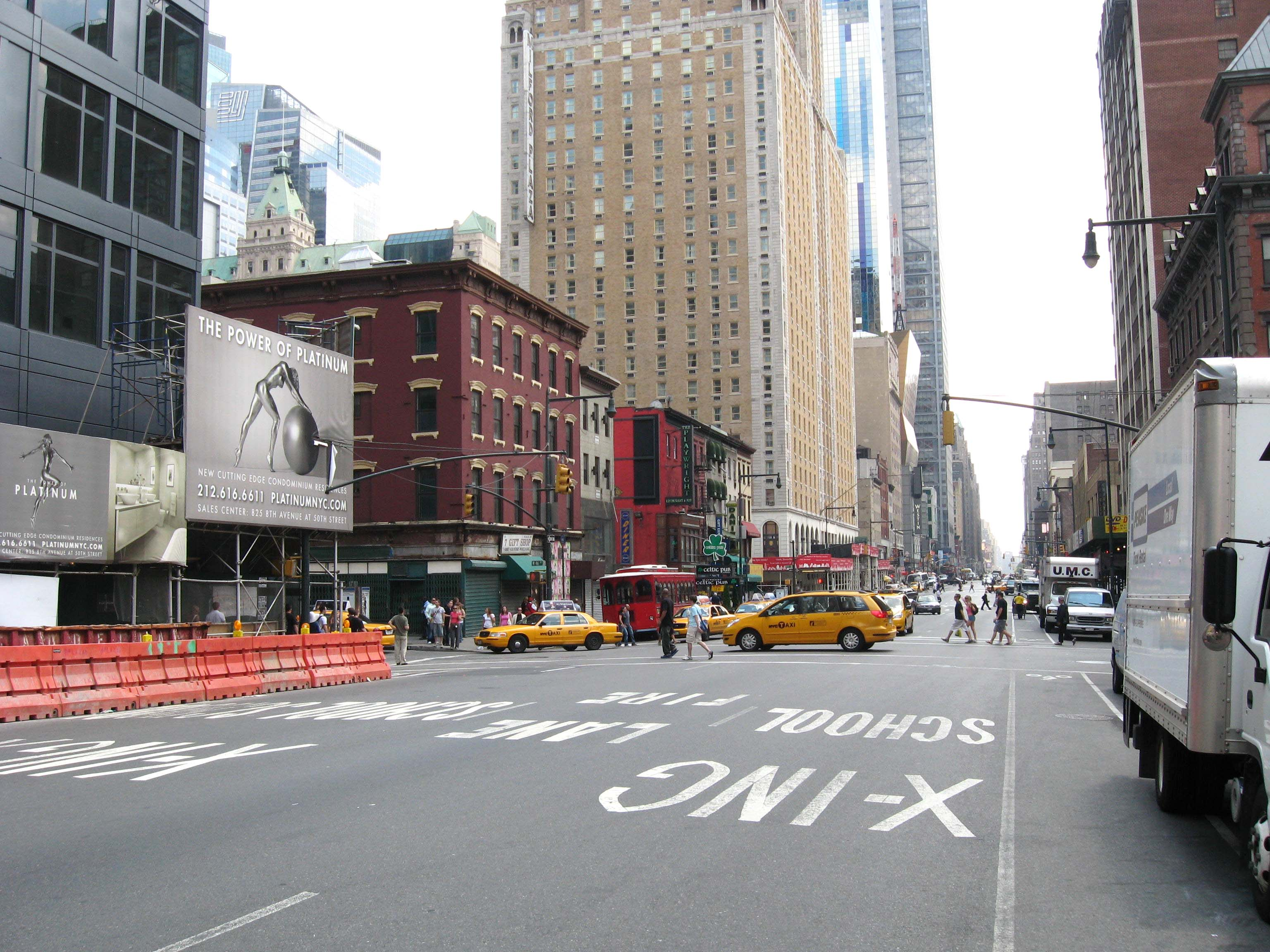
Looking south from Eighth Avenue and 46th Street

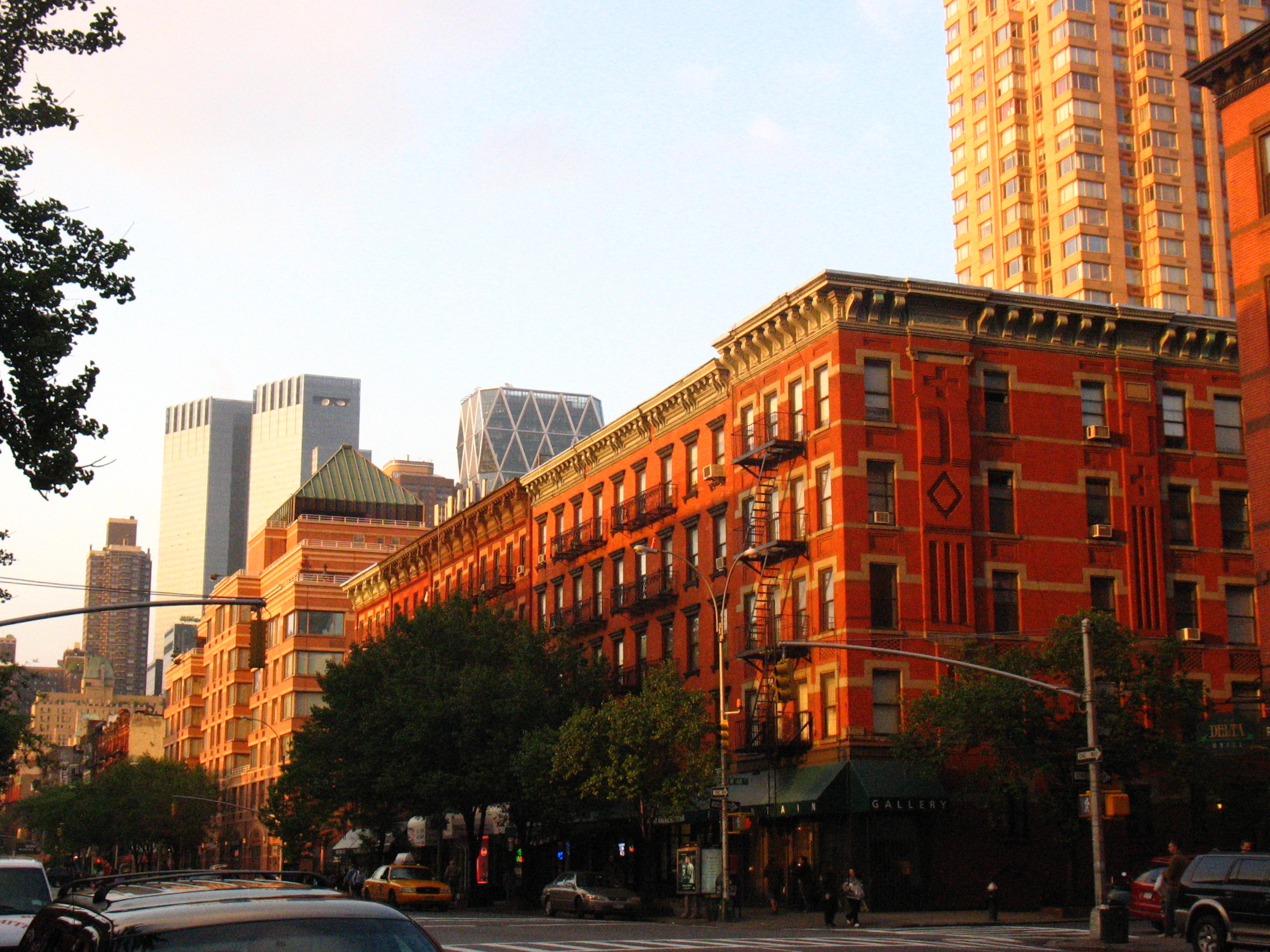
View from between 47th and 48th Streets on Ninth Avenue looking northeast toward Time Warner Center and Hearst Tower

Several explanations exist for the origin of the neighborhood's current name. An early use of the phrase appears in a comment Davy Crockett made about another notorious Irish slum in Manhattan, Five Points. According to the Irish Cultural Society of the Garden City Area:

When, in 1835, Davy Crockett said "In my part of the country, when you meet an Irishman, you find a first-rate gentleman; but these are worse than savages; they are too mean to swab hell's kitchen," he was referring to the Five Points.

According to an article by Kirkley Greenwell, published online by the Hell's Kitchen Neighborhood Association:

No one can pin down the exact origin of the label, but some refer to a tenement on 54th Street as the first "Hell's Kitchen." Another explanation points to an infamous building at 39th as the true origin. A gang and a local dive took the name as well.

Local historian Mary Clark explained the name thus:

... first appeared in print on September 22, 1881 when a New York Times reporter went to the West 30s with a police guide to get details of a multiple murder there. He referred to a particularly infamous tenement at 39th Street and Tenth Avenue as "Hell's Kitchen" and said that the entire section was "probably the lowest and filthiest in the city." According to this version, 39th Street between 9th and 10th Avenues became known as Hell's Kitchen, and the name was later expanded to the surrounding streets. Another version ascribes the name's origins to a German restaurant in the area known as Heil's Kitchen, after its proprietors. But the most common version traces it to the story of "Dutch Fred the Cop," a veteran policeman, who with his rookie partner, was watching a small riot on West 39th Street near Tenth Avenue. The rookie is supposed to have said: "This place is hell itself", to which Fred replied: "Hell's a mild climate. This is Hell's Kitchen."

The 1929 book Manna-Hatin: The Story of New York states that the Panic of 1857 led to the formation of gangs "in the notorious 'Gas House District' at Twenty-First Street and the East River, or in 'Hell's Kitchen', in the West Thirties".

Hell's Kitchen is frequently used to name the neighborhood, although real estate developers designate the area as "Clinton" and "Midtown West". The "Clinton name", used by the municipality of New York City, originated in 1959 in an attempt to change the image of the neighborhood by linking the area to DeWitt Clinton Park at 52nd and Eleventh Avenue, named after the 19th century New York governor, though The New York Times noted that those who live in the area "prefer Hell's Kitchen" as the name for the neighborhood.

== History ==
=== Early history and development ===
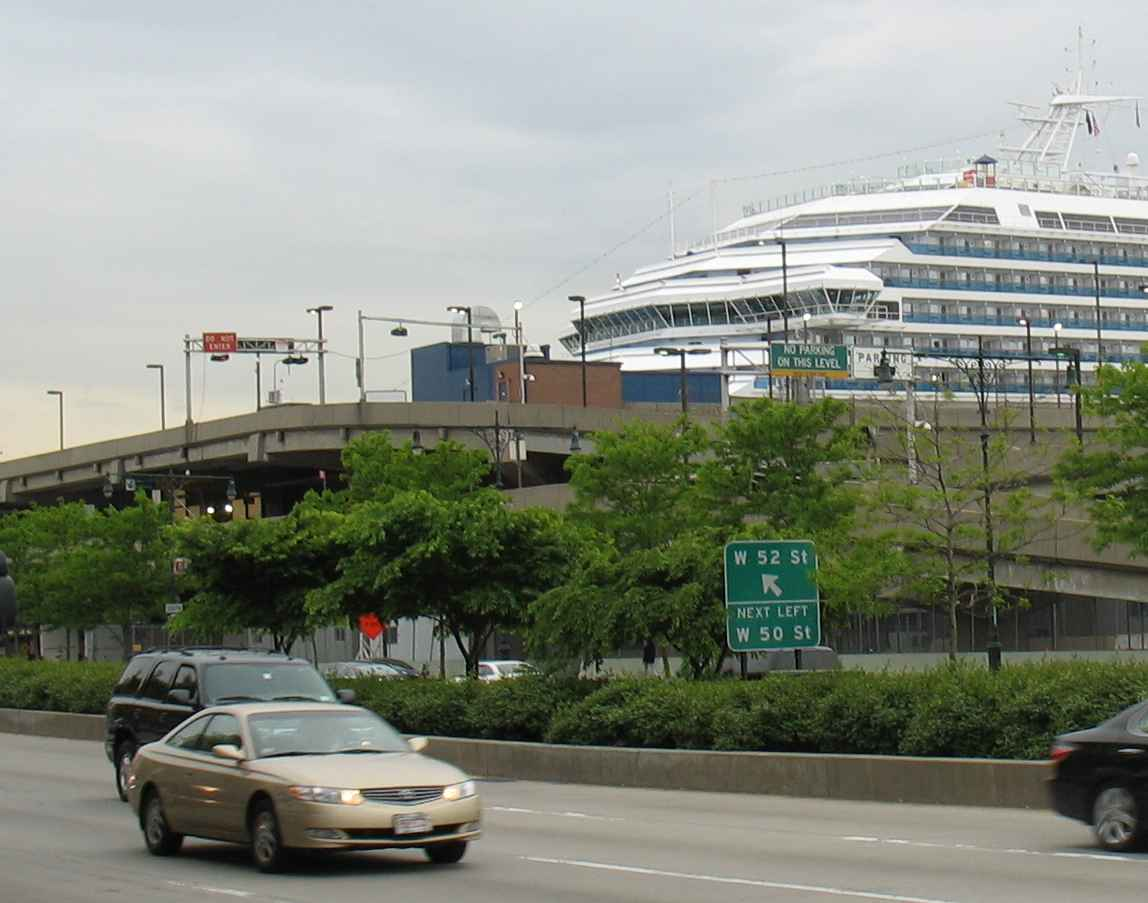
Manhattan Cruise Terminal in Hell's Kitchen at 52nd Street

On the island of Manhattan when Europeans first saw it, the Great Kill formed from three small streams that united near present-day Tenth Avenue and 40th Street, and then wound through the low-lying Reed Valley, renowned for fish and waterfowl, emptying into the Hudson River at a deep bay on the river at the present 42nd Street. The name was retained in a tiny hamlet called Great Kill, which became a center for carriage-making. The upland to the south and east became known as Longacre, the predecessor of Longacre Square, now Times Square.

One of the large farms of the colonial era in this neighborhood was that of Andreas Hopper and his descendants, extending from today's 48th Street nearly to 59th Street and from the river east to what is now Sixth Avenue. One of the Hopper farmhouses, built in 1752 for John Hopper the younger, stood near 53rd Street and Eleventh Avenue. Christened "Rosevale" for its extensive gardens, it was the home of the War of 1812 veteran, Gen. Garrit Hopper Striker, and lasted until 1896, when it was demolished.

The site was purchased for the city and naturalistically landscaped by Samuel Parsons Jr. as DeWitt Clinton Park. In 1911, New York Hospital bought a full city block largely of the Hopper property, between 54th and 55th Streets, Eleventh and Twelfth Avenues. Beyond the railroad track, projecting into the river at 54th Street, was Mott's Point, with an 18th-century Mott family house surrounded by gardens, that was inhabited by members of the family until 1884 and survived until 1895.

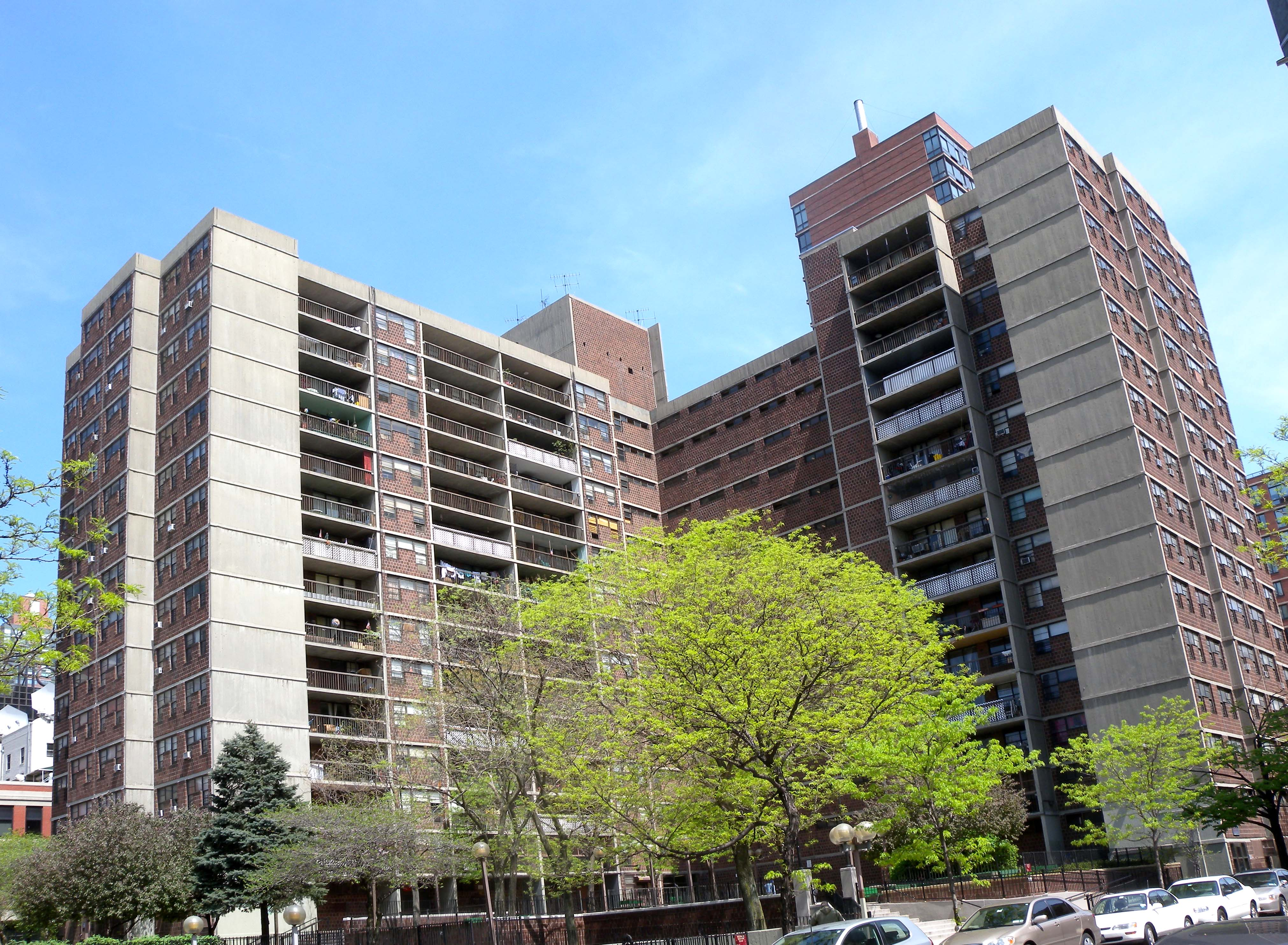
Harborview Terrace public housing buildings between West 54th and West 56th Streets, and Tenth and Eleventh Avenues, part of the New York City Housing Authority

A lone surviving structure from the time this area was open farmland and suburban villas is a pre-1800s carriage house that once belonged to a villa owned by former Vice President and New York State governor George Clinton, now in a narrow court behind 422 West 46th Street. From 1811 until it was officially demapped in 1857, the diminutive Bloomingdale Square was part of the city's intended future. It extended from 53rd to 57th Streets between Eighth and Ninth Avenues. It was eliminated after the establishment of Central Park, and the name shifted to the junction of Broadway, West End Avenue, and 106th Street, now Straus Park.

In 1825, the City purchased for $10 clear title to a right-of-way through John Leake Norton's (Note: Norton, the great-nephew of John Leake, founder of Leake and Watts Children's Home, is listed among early 19th-century owners of considerable tracts in what is now Hell's Kitchen, with John Jacob Astor, William Cutting, Thomas Addis Emmet, Andrew Hopper, John Horn and William Wright.) farm, "The Hermitage", to lay out 42nd Street clear to the river. Before long, cattle ferried from Weehawken were being driven along the unpaved route to slaughterhouses on the East Side. Seventy acres of the Leakes', later the Nortons' property, extending north from 42nd to 46th Street and from Broadway to the river, were purchased before 1807 by John Jacob Astor and William Cutting, who held it before dividing it into building lots as the district became more suburban.

The West Side later had its own slaughterhouses, which went out of business in the middle 20th century.

=== Unity with the city and deterioration ===
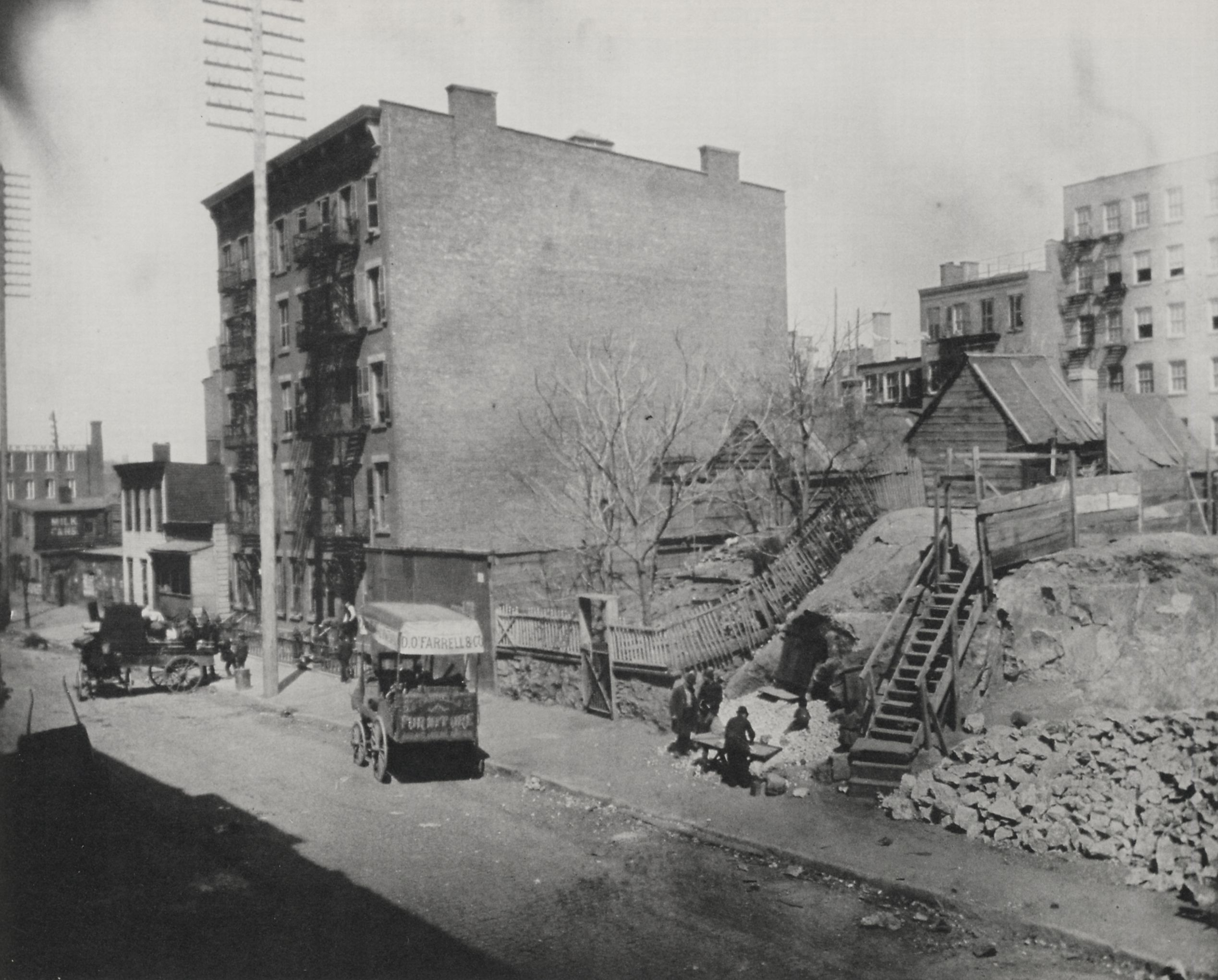
Hell's Kitchen and Sebastopol, c. 1890, photographed by Jacob Riis

There were multiple changes that helped Hell's Kitchen integrate with New York City proper. The first was construction of the Hudson River Railroad, whose initial leg – the 40 mi (64 km) to Peekskill – was completed on September 29, 1849, By the end of 1849, it stretched to Poughkeepsie and in 1851 it extended to Albany. The track ran at a steep grade up Eleventh Avenue, as far as 60th Street.

The formerly rural riverfront was industrialized by businesses, such as tanneries, that used the river for shipping products and dumping waste. The neighborhood that would later be known as Hell's Kitchen started forming in the southern part of the 22nd Ward in the mid-19th century. Irish immigrants – mostly refugees from the Great Famine – found work on the docks and railroad along the Hudson River and established shantytowns there.

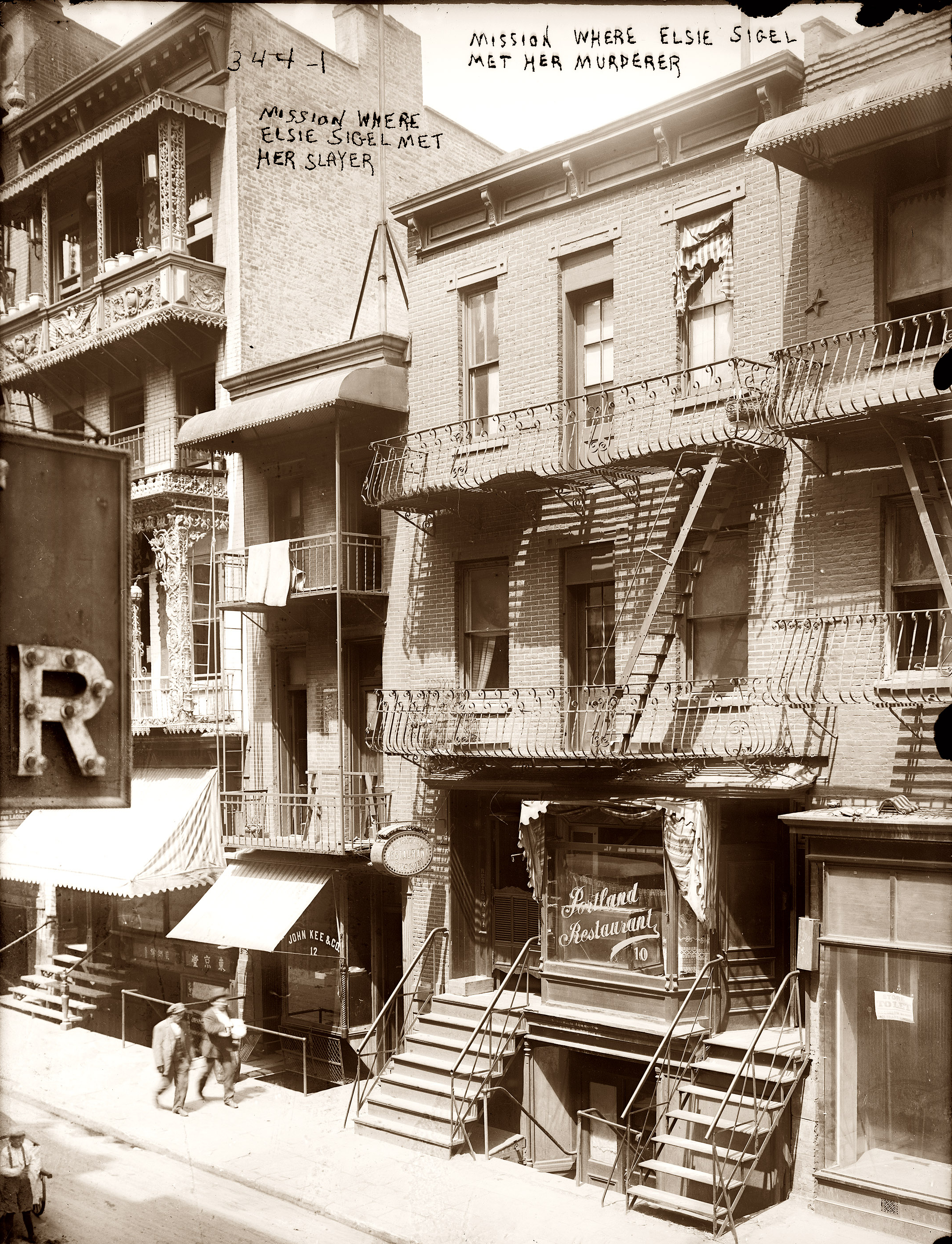
Mission House, Hell's Kitchen, c. 1915

After the American Civil War, there was an influx of people who moved to New York City. The tenements that were built became overcrowded quickly. Many who lived in this congested, poverty-stricken area turned to gang life. Following Prohibition, implemented in 1919, the district's many warehouses were ideal locations for bootleg distilleries for the rumrunners who controlled illicit liquor. At the start of the 20th century, the neighborhood was controlled by gangs, including the violent Gopher Gang led by One Lung Curran and later by Owney Madden.

Early gangs, like the Hell's Kitchen Gang, transformed into organized crime entities, around the same time that Owney Madden became one of the most powerful mobsters in New York. It became known as the "most dangerous area on the American Continent".

By the 1930s, when the McGraw-Hill Building was constructed in Hell's Kitchen, the surrounding area was still largely tenements. After the repeal of Prohibition, many of the organized crime elements moved into other rackets, such as illegal gambling and union shakedowns. The postwar era was characterized by a flourishing waterfront, and longshoreman work was plentiful.

By the end of the 1970s, the implementation of containerized shipping led to the decline of the West Side piers and many longshoremen found themselves out of work. In addition, construction of the Lincoln Tunnel in the 1930s, Lincoln Tunnel access roads, and the Port Authority Bus Terminal and ramps starting in 1950 destroyed much of Hell's Kitchen south of 41st Street.

In 1959, an aborted rumble between rival Irish and Puerto Rican gangs led to the notorious "Capeman" murders in which two innocent teenagers, mistaken for rival gang members, were killed. By 1965, Hell's Kitchen was the home base of the Westies, an Irish mob aligned with the Gambino crime family. In the early 1980s widespread gentrification began to alter the demographics of the long-time working-class Irish American neighborhood. The 1980s saw an end to the Westies' reign of terror, when the gang lost all of its power after the RICO convictions of most of its principals in 1986.

=== First wave of gentrification ===
==== Special Clinton zoning district ====
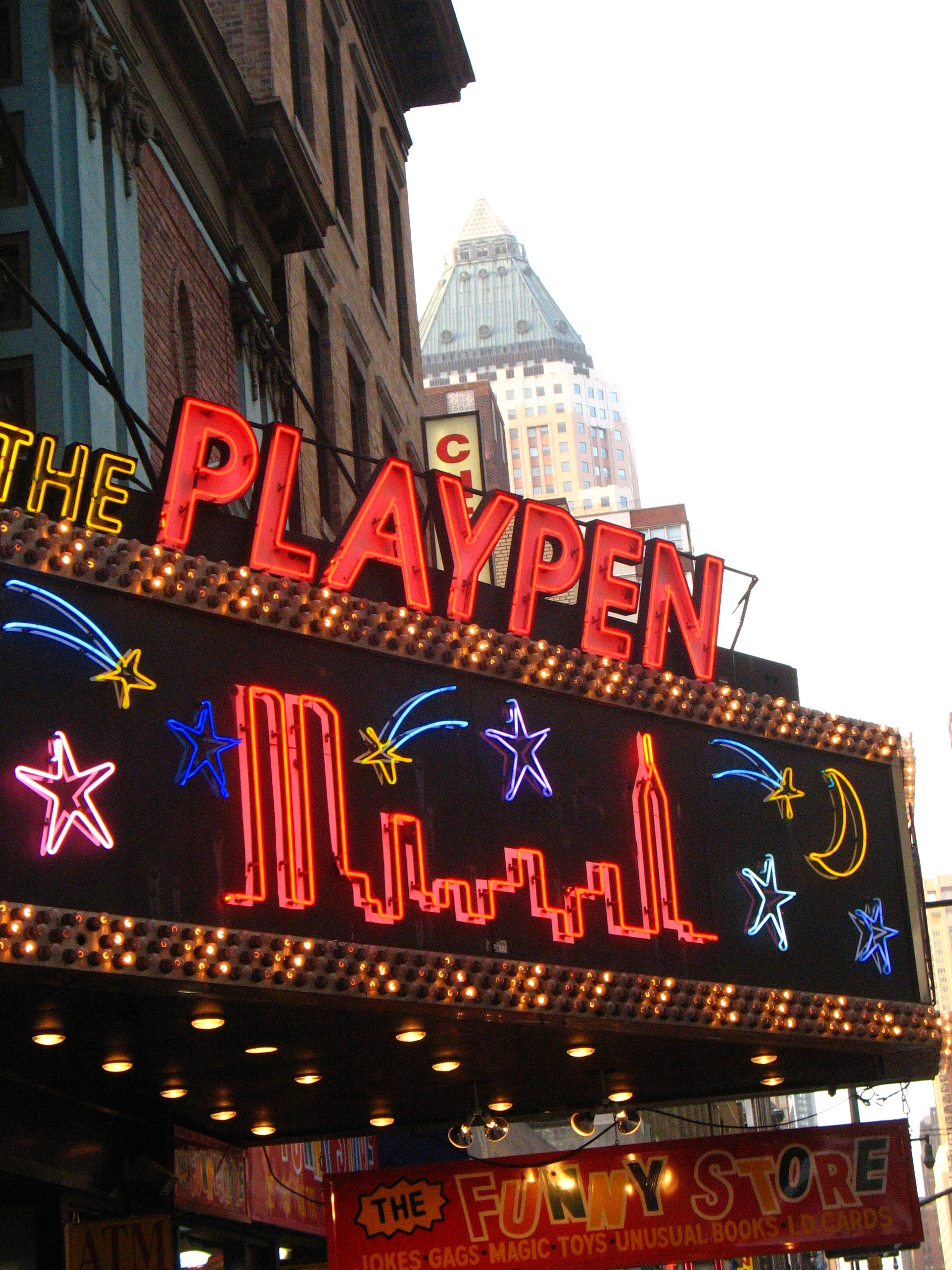
Eighth Avenue was once lined with porn stores and theaters. The stores have mostly gone since the late 1990s, but this particular store, which was highlighted in the 2003 film Phone Booth, remained until 2007.

Although the neighborhood is immediately west of New York's main business district, large-scale redevelopment has been kept in check for more than 40 years by strict zoning rules in a Special Clinton District designed to protect the neighborhood's residents and its low-rise character.

In part to qualify for federal aid, New York developed a comprehensive Plan for New York City in 1969–70. While for almost all neighborhoods, the master plan contained few proposals, it was very explicit about the bright future of Hell's Kitchen. The plan called for 2,000 to 3,000 new hotel rooms, 25,000 apartments, 25×10^{6} sq ft (2,300,000 m^{2}) of office space, a new super liner terminal, a subway along 48th Street, and a convention center to replace what the plan described as "blocks of antiquated and deteriorating structures of every sort." However, outrage at the massive residential displacement that this development project would have caused, and the failure of the City to complete any replacement housing, led to opposition to the first project – a new convention center to replace the New York Coliseum.

To prevent the convention center from sparking a development boom that would beget the rest of the master plan with its consequent displacement, the Clinton Planning Council and Daniel Gutman, their environmental planner, proposed that the convention center and all major development be located south of 42nd Street, where public policy had already left tracts of vacant land.

Nevertheless, in 1973, the Jacob K. Javits Convention Center was approved for a 44th Street site that would replace piers 84 and 86. But in exchange, and after the defeat of a bond issue that would have funded a 48th Street "people mover", the City first abandoned the rest of the 1969–70 master plan and then gave the neighborhood a special zoning district to restrict further redevelopment. Since then, limited new development has filled in the many empty lots and rejuvenated existing buildings. Later, in 1978, when the city could not afford the higher cost of constructing the 44th Street convention center over water, the Mayor and Governor chose the rail yard site originally proposed by the local community.

The SCD was originally split into four areas:

- Preservation Area: 43rd to 56th Streets between Eighth and Tenth Avenues. R-7 density, 6-story height limit on new buildings, suggested average apartment size of two bedrooms. This was a response to the fact that between 1960 and 1970 developers had torn down 2,300 family-sized units and replaced them with 1,500 smaller units.
- Perimeter Area: Eighth Avenue, 42nd and 57th Streets. Bulkier development permitted to counterbalance the downzoning in the preservation area.
- Mixed Use Area: Tenth and Eleventh Avenues between 43rd and 50th Streets. Mixed residential and manufacturing. New residential development only permitted in conjunction with manufacturing areas. Later combined into "Other Areas".
- Other Areas: West of Eleventh Avenue. Industrial and waterfront uses. Later combined with "Mixed Use Area"

Special permits are required for all demolition and construction in the SCD, including demolition of "any sound housing in the District" and any rehabilitation that increases the number of dwellings in a structure. In the original provisions, no building could be demolished unless it was unsound. New developments, conversions, or alterations that create new units or zero bedroom units must contain at least 20% two bedroom apartments with a minimum room size of 168 sq ft (16 m^{2}).

Alterations that reduce the percentage of two-bedroom units are not permitted unless the resulting building meets the 20% two-bedroom requirement. Building height in the Preservation Area cannot exceed 66 ft (20 m) or seven stories, whichever is less.

==== Windermere ====
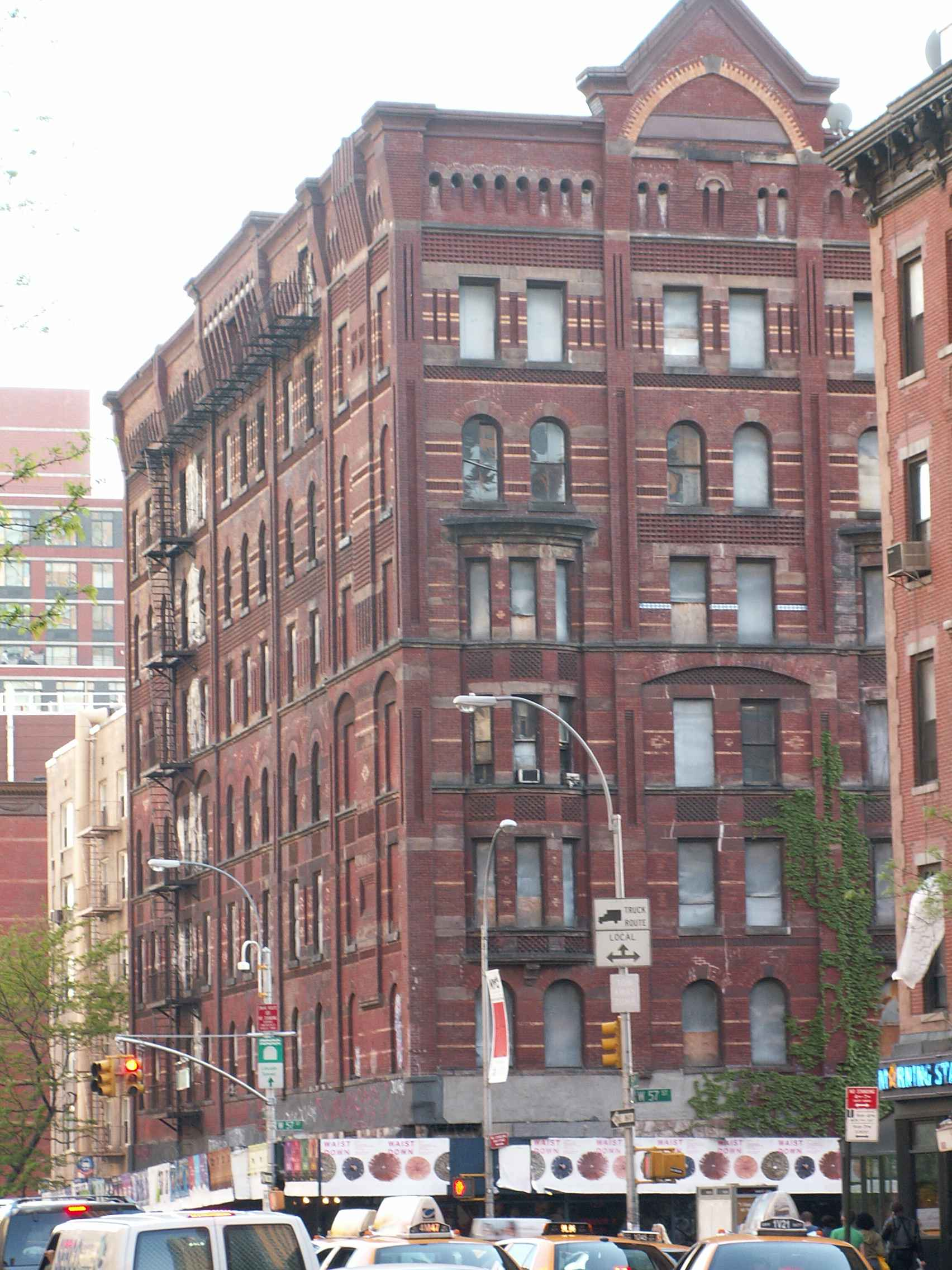
The Windermere Apartments at Ninth Avenue and 57th Street

As the gentrification pace increased, there were numerous reports of problems between landlords and tenants. The most extreme example was the eight-story Windermere Apartments complex at the southwest corner of Ninth Avenue and 57th Street. Built in 1881, it is the second-oldest large apartment house in Manhattan.

In 1980, the owner, Alan B. Weissman, tried to empty the building of its tenants. According to former tenants and court papers, rooms were ransacked, doors were ripped out, prostitutes were moved in, and tenants received death threats in the campaign to empty the building. All the major New York newspapers covered the trials that sent the Windermere's managers to jail. Although Weissman was never linked to the harassment, he and his wife made top billing in the 1985 edition of The Village Voice's annual list, "The Dirty Dozen: New York's Worst Landlords."

Most of the tenants eventually settled and moved out of the building. In May 2006, seven tenants remained and court orders protecting the tenants and the building allowed it to remain in a derelict condition even as the surrounding neighborhood was experiencing a dramatic burst of demolition and redevelopment. In September 2007, the fire department evacuated the remaining seven residents from the building, citing dangerous conditions, and padlocked the front door. In 2008, the New York Supreme Court ruled that the owners of the building, who include the TOA Construction Corporation of Japan, must repair it.

==== Failed rezoning attempts ====
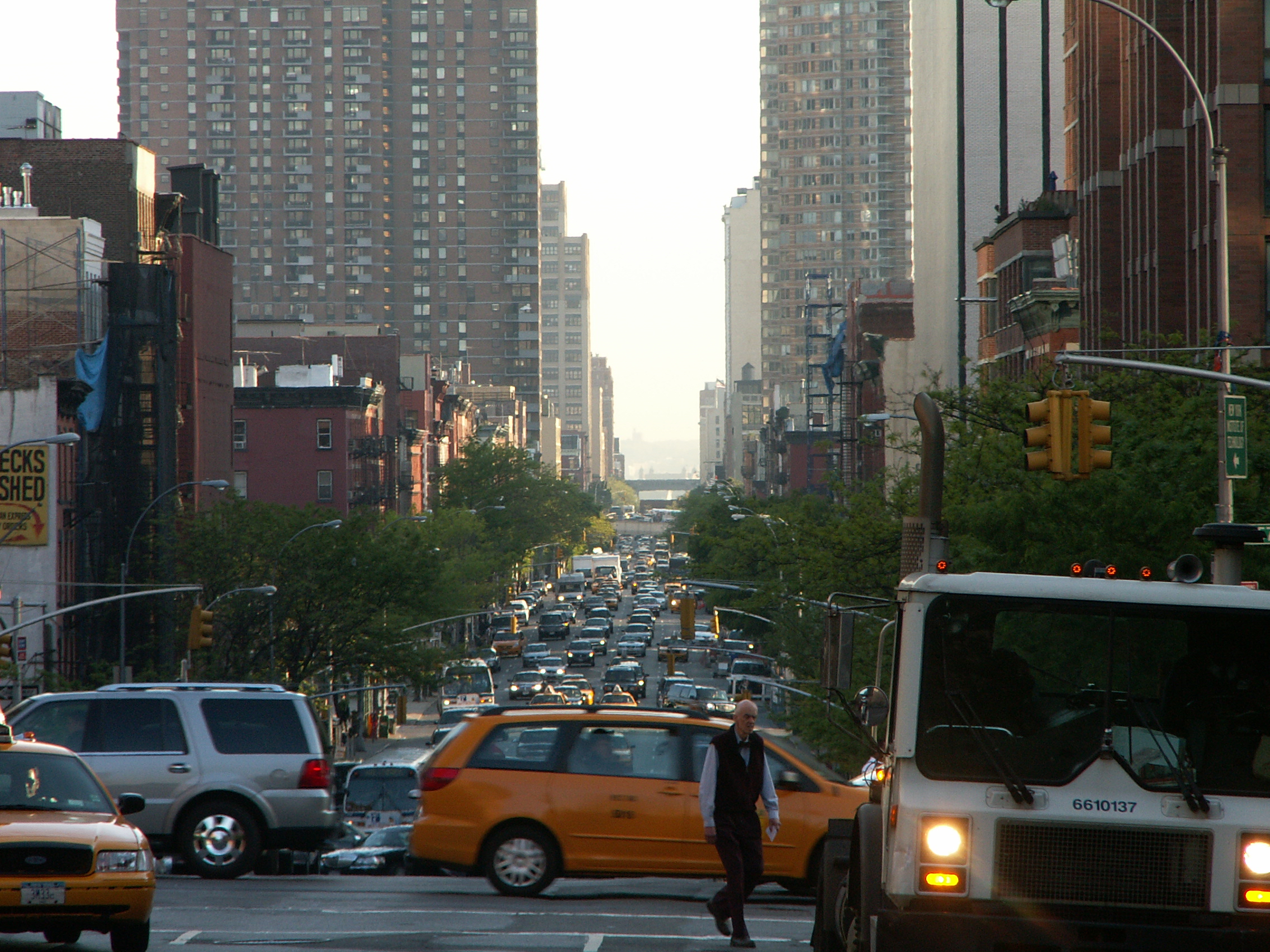
Looking south on Tenth Avenue from 59th Street

By the 1980s, the area south of 42nd Street was in decline. Both the state and the city hoped that the Jacob K. Javits Convention Center would renew the area. Hotels, restaurants, apartment buildings, and television studios were proposed. One proposal included apartments and hotels on a 30 acres (12 ha) pier jutting out onto Hudson River, which included a marina, ferry slip, stores, restaurants, and a performing arts center. At Ninth Avenue and 33rd Street, a 32-story office tower would be built. Hotels, apartment buildings, and a Madison Square Garden would be built over the tracks west of Pennsylvania Station. North of the Javits Center, a "Television City" would be developed by Larry Silverstein in conjunction with NBC.

One impediment to development was the lack of mass transit in the area, which is far from Penn Station, and none of the proposals for a link to Penn Station was pursued successfully, for example, the ill-fated West Side Transitway. No changes to the zoning policy happened until 1990, when the city rezoned a small segment of 11th Avenue near the Javits Center. In 1993, part of 9th Avenue between 35th and 41st Streets was also rezoned. However, neither of these rezonings was particularly significant, as most of the area was still zoned as a manufacturing district with low-rise apartment buildings.

By the early 1990s, there was a recession, which scuttled plans for rezoning and severely reduced the amount of development in the area. After the recession was over, developers invested in areas like Times Square, eastern Hell's Kitchen, and Chelsea, but mostly skipped the Far West Side.

=== September 11, 2001 ===
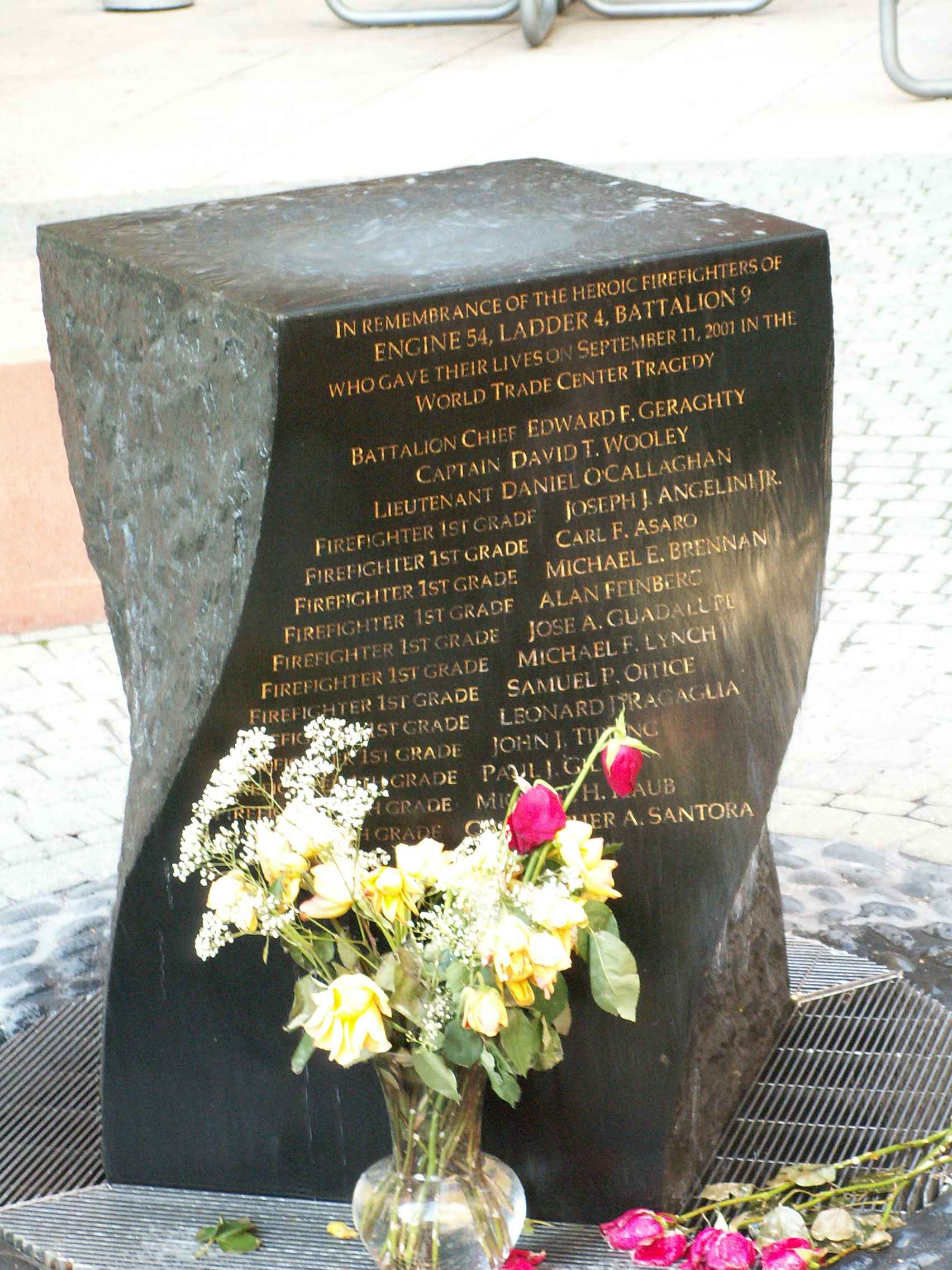
Memorial to 15 firefighters from Engine Co. 54/Ladder Co. 4/Battalion 9 who died on September 11, 2001

While most fire stations in Manhattan lost firefighters in the September 11 attacks in 2001, the station with the greatest loss of firefighters was Engine Co. 54/Ladder Co. 4/Battalion 9 at 48th Street and Eighth Avenue, which lost 15 firefighters, an entire shift on duty. Given its proximity to Midtown, the station specializes in skyscraper fires and rescues. In 2007, it was the second-busiest firehouse in New York City, with 9,685 runs between the two companies.

Its patch reads "Pride of Midtown" and "Never Missed a Performance". Memorials dot the station's exterior walls and a granite memorial is in a park to its north. Ladder 21, the "Pride of Hell's Kitchen", located on 38th Street between Ninth and Tenth Avenues, and stationed with Engine Co. 34, lost seven firefighters on September 11. In addition, on September 11, Engine Co. 26 was temporarily stationed with Engine Co. 34/Ladder Co. 21 and lost many firefighters themselves.

=== Redevelopment and second wave of gentrification ===
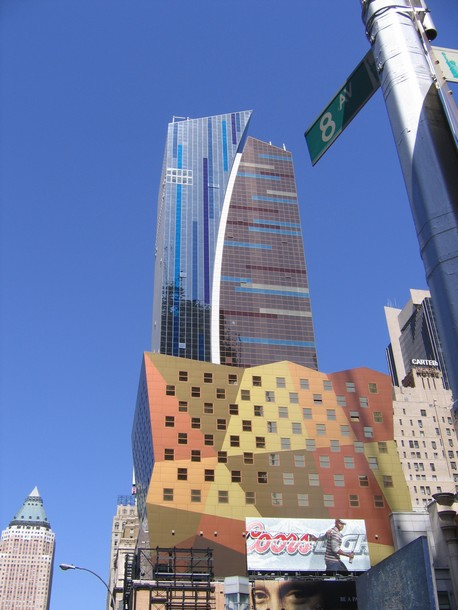
Looking north on 8th Avenue from 42nd Street

Hell's Kitchen has become an increasingly upscale neighborhood of affluent young professionals as well as residents from the "old days", with rents in the neighborhood having increased dramatically above the average in Manhattan. It has also acquired a large and diverse community as residents have moved north from Chelsea. Zoning has long restricted the extension of Midtown Manhattan's skyscraper development into Hell's Kitchen, at least north of 42nd Street.

In 1989, the David Childs- and Frank Williams-designed Worldwide Plaza established a beachhead when it was built at the former Madison Square Garden site, a full city block between 49th and 50th Streets and between Eighth and Ninth Avenues that was exempt from special district zoning rules. This project led a real-estate building boom on Eighth Avenue, including the Hearst Tower at 56th Street and Eighth Avenue.

An indication of how fast real estate prices rose in the neighborhood was a 2004 transaction involving the Howard Johnson's Motel at 52nd Street and Eighth Avenue. In June, Vikram Chatwal's Hampshire Hotel Group bought the motel and adjoining Studio Instrument Rental building for $9 million. In August, they sold the property to Elad Properties for about $43 million. Elad, which formerly owned the Plaza Hotel, built The Link, a luxury 44-story building, at that location.

Silverstein Properties and Greenwood Gaming & Entertainment had bid for a downstate New York casino license with the hope of developing a resort and casino in the neighborhood had they secured a license. They had proposed The Avenir, which would be a resort with 1,000 hotel rooms, an eight-story casino and a 1,000 seat performance venue. 100 affordable housing units would also have been built. The community advisory committee rejected the proposal in September 2025.

==== Hudson Yards ====
In 2003, the New York City Department of City Planning issued a master plan that envisioned the creation of 40,000,000 ft^{2} (3,700,000 m^{2}) of commercial and residential development, two corridors of open space. Dubbed the Hudson Yards Master Plan, the area covered is bordered on the east by Seventh and Eighth Avenues, on the south by West 28th and 30th Streets, on the north by West 43rd Street, and on the west by Hudson River Park and the Hudson River. The City's plan was similar to a neighborhood plan produced by architect Meta Brunzema and environmental planner Daniel Gutman for the Hell's Kitchen Neighborhood Association (HKNA). The main concept of the HKNA plan was to allow major new development while protecting the existing residential core area between Ninth and Tenth avenues.

As plans developed, they included a mixed-use real estate development by Related Companies and Oxford Properties over the MTA's West Side Yard; a renovation of the Javits Convention Center; and the 7 Subway Extension to the 34th Street–Hudson Yards station at 34th Street and 11th Avenue, which opened on September 13, 2015. The first phase of the Related project, completed in March 2019, comprises The Shops & Restaurants at Hudson Yards, a public space centered around the Vessel structure, the Shed arts center, and several skyscrapers. By the 2010s, the neighborhood had become home to young Wall Street financiers.

== Demographics ==
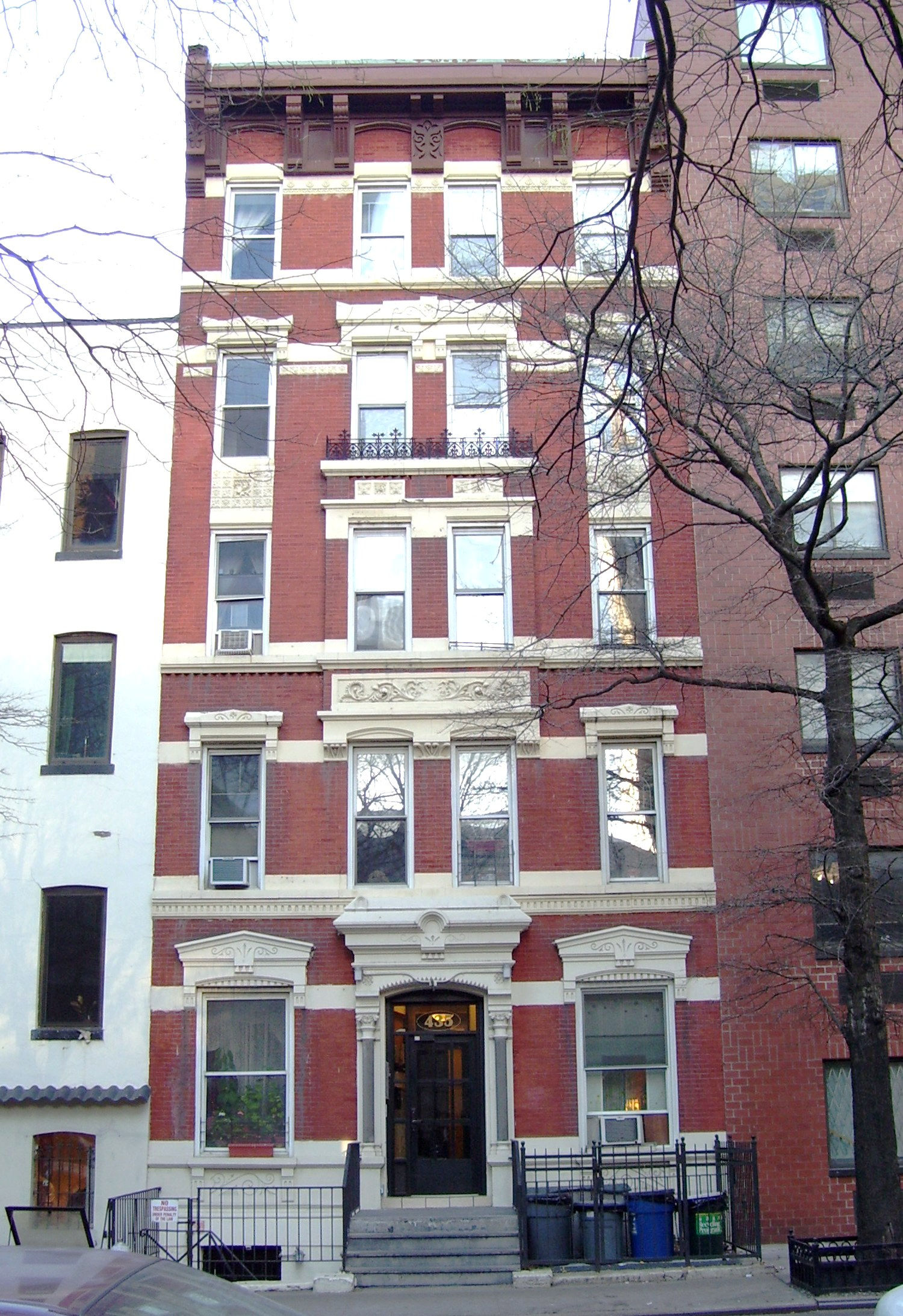
West 43rd Street

Based on data from the 2020 United States census, the population of Hell's Kitchen (Clinton) was 49,758, an increase of 3,874 (8.4%) from the 45,884 counted in 2010. Covering an area of 0.841 sq mi (2.18 km2), the neighborhood had a population density of 59,165/sq. mi (22,825/sq. km). The racial makeup of the neighborhood was 52.8% White, 5.5% African American, 21.1% Hispanic or Latino, 17.5% Asian, and 3.2% from other races.

The entirety of Community District 4, which comprises Hell's Kitchen and Chelsea, had 122,119 inhabitants as of NYC Health's 2018 Community Health Profile, with an average life expectancy of 83.1 years. This was higher than the 2016 median life expectancy of 81.2 for all New York City neighborhoods. In 2018, most inhabitants were adults: a plurality (45%) were between the ages of 25–44. 26% were aged between 45–64, and 13% were 65 or older. The ratio of youth and college-aged residents was lower, at 9% and 8% respectively.

In 2017, the median household income in Community Districts 4 and 5 was $101,981. In 2018, an estimated 11% of Hell's Kitchen and Chelsea residents lived in poverty, compared to 14% in all of Manhattan and 20% in all of New York City. One in twenty residents (5%) was unemployed, compared to 7% in Manhattan and 9% in New York City. Rent burden, or the percentage of residents who have difficulty paying their rent, is 41% in Hell's Kitchen and Chelsea, compared to the boroughwide and citywide rates of 45% and 51% respectively. Based on this calculation, as of 2018, Hell's Kitchen and Chelsea are considered to be high-income relative to the rest of the city and not gentrifying.

== Culture ==
=== Entertainment industry ===
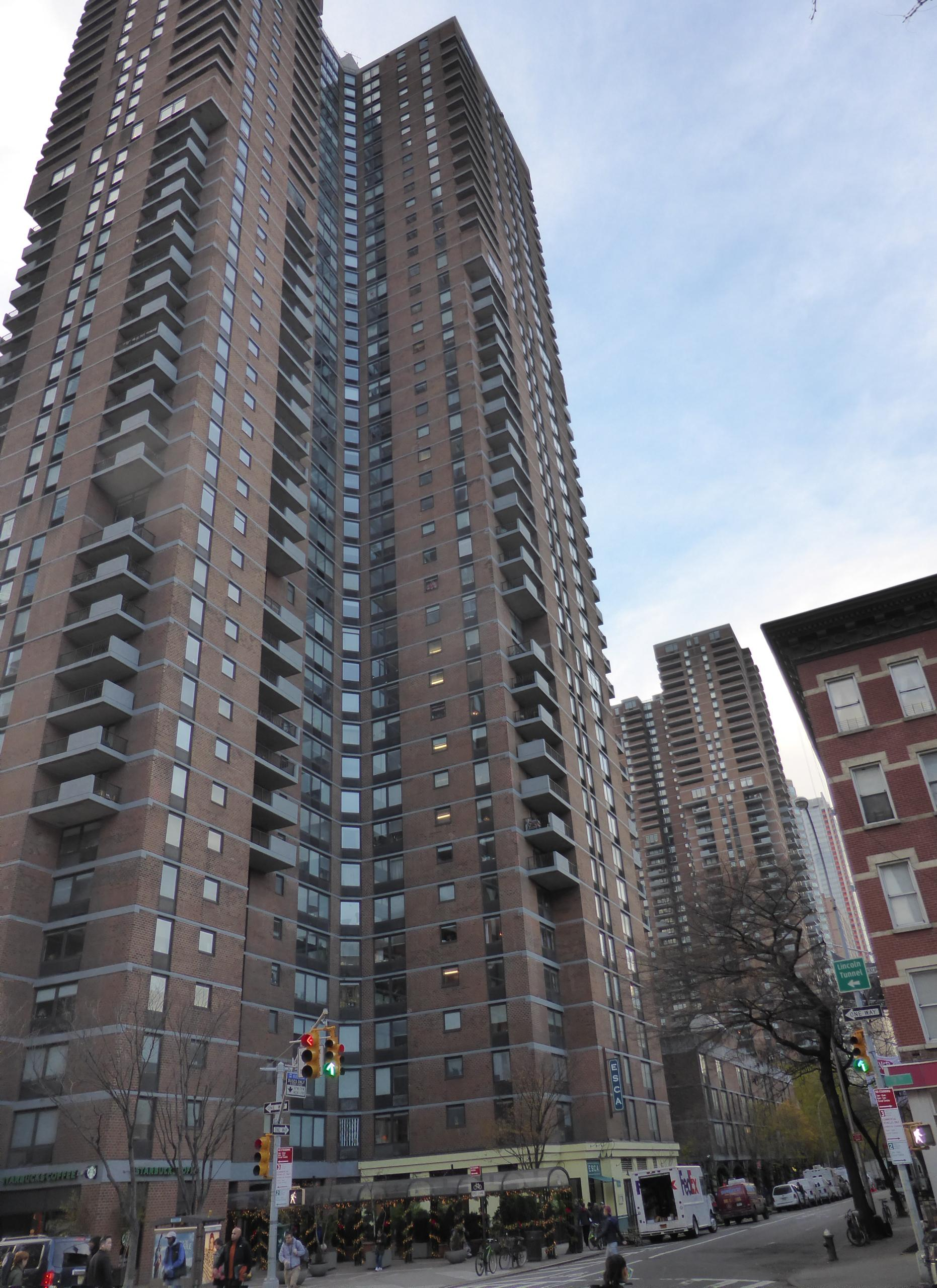
Manhattan Plaza, performing artists' residence, Ninth Avenue/43rd Street

Hell's Kitchen's gritty reputation had made its housing prices lower than elsewhere in Manhattan. Given the lower costs in the past and its proximity to Broadway theatres, the neighborhood is a haven for aspiring actors. Many famous actors and entertainers have resided there, including Burt Reynolds, Rip Torn, Timothée Chalamet, Bob Hope, Charlton Heston, James Dean, Madonna, Jerry Seinfeld, Larry David, Alicia Keys, and Sylvester Stallone. This is due in large part to the Actors Studio on West 44th at which Lee Strasberg taught and developed method acting.

With the opening of the original Improv by Budd Friedman in 1963, the club became a hangout for singers to perform and quickly attracted comedians as well, turning it into the reigning comedy club of its time. Once located at 358 West 44th Street and Ninth Avenue, it has since closed.

Manhattan Plaza at 43rd Street between Ninth and Tenth Avenues was built in the 1970s to house artists. It consists of two 46-story towers with 70% of the apartments set aside for rent discounts for those who work in the arts. The Actors' Temple and St. Malachy Roman Catholic Church with its Actors' Chapel also testify to the long-time presence of show business people.

The neighborhood is also home to many broadcast and music-recording studios, including the CBS Broadcast Center at 524 West 57th Street, where the CBS television network records many of its news and sports programs such as 60 Minutes and The NFL Today; the former Sony Music Studios at 460 West 54th Street, which closed in 2007; Manhattan Center Studios at 311 West 34th Street; and Right Track Recording's Studio A509 orchestral recording facility at West 38th Street and Tenth Avenue.

The syndicated Montel Williams Show was taped at the Unitel Studios, 433 West 53rd Street, between Ninth and Tenth Avenues. The Power Station recording studios are located near the intersection of 57th Street and Ninth Avenue in Hell's Kitchen. In 2016, singer and songwriter Sting recorded his album entitled 57th & 9th there. The progressive metal band Dream Theater recorded their fourth studio album Falling into Infinity at the studio. Their song "Hell's Kitchen" is named after this area.

The Comedy Central satirical news program The Daily Show was taped in Hell's Kitchen since its debut until late 2021 when it moved to Times Square. In 2005, it moved from its quarters at 54th Street and Tenth Avenue to a new studio in the neighborhood, at 733 Eleventh Avenue, between 51st and 52nd Streets. The 54th and 10th location was used for The Colbert Report throughout its entire run from 2005 until 2014. Until its cancellation, the studio was used for The Nightly Show with Larry Wilmore, following Stephen Colbert's departure from Comedy Central. The studio was later used for Tha God's Honest Truth, produced by Colbert. Next door at 511 West 54th Street is Ars Nova theater, home to emerging artists Joe Iconis and breakout star Jesse Eisenberg, among others.

The headquarters of Troma studios was located in Hell's Kitchen before their move to Long Island City in Queens. The Baryshnikov Arts Center opened at 37 Arts on 37th Street in 2005, and the Orchestra of St. Luke's opened the DiMenna Center for Classical Music in the same building in 2011. The Alvin Ailey American Dance Theater opened at 55th Street and Ninth Avenue in 2006. The Metropolitan Community Church of New York, geared toward an LGBTQ membership, is located in Hell's Kitchen.

=== Food ===
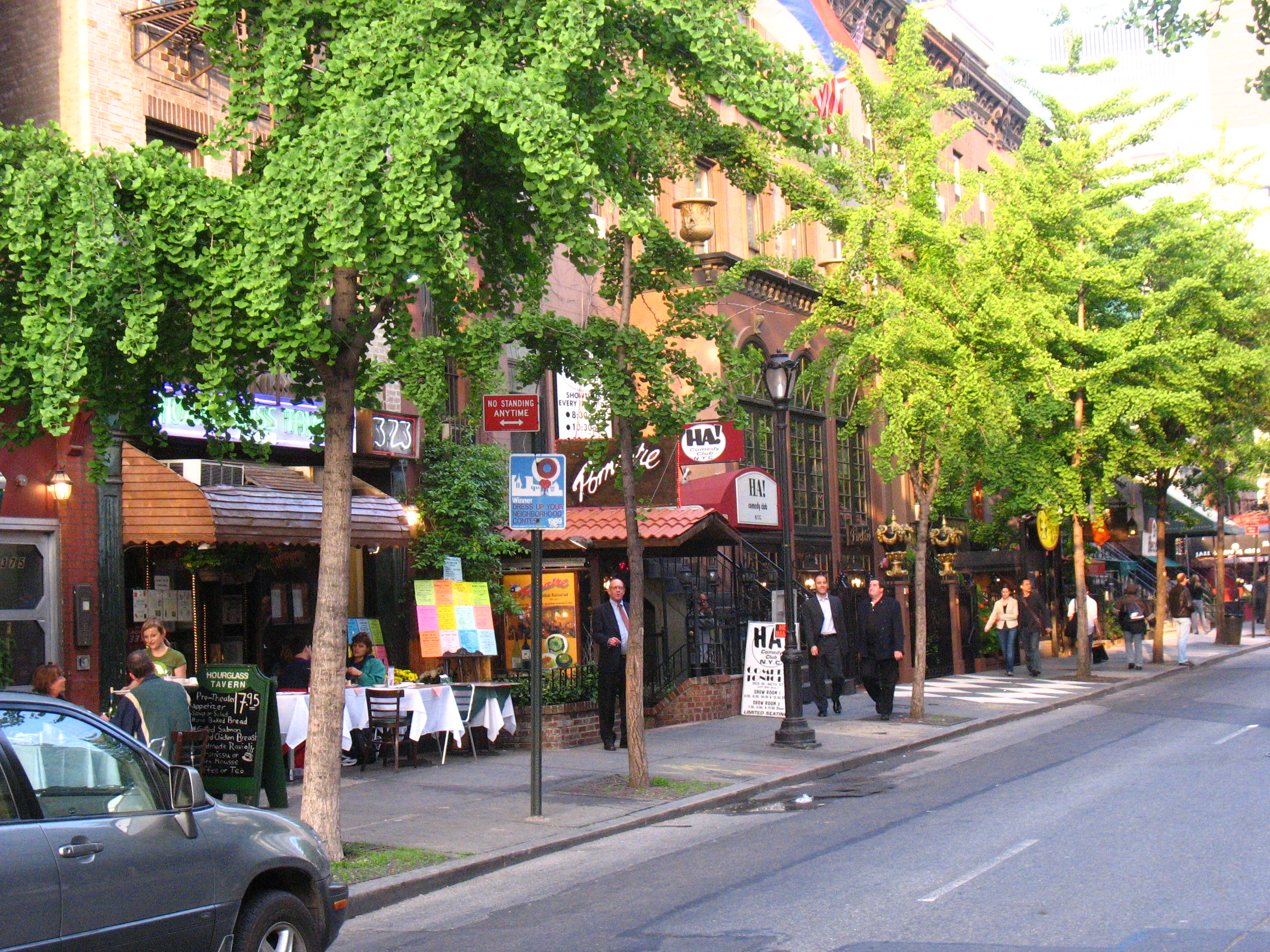
Restaurant Row on West 46th Street

Ninth Avenue is noted for its many ethnic restaurants. The Ninth Avenue Association's International Food Festival stretches through Hell's Kitchen from 42nd to 57th Streets every May, usually on the third weekend of the month. It has been going on since 1974 and is one of the oldest street fairs in the city. There are Caribbean, Chinese, French, German, Greek, Italian, Irish, Mexican, and Thai restaurants as well as multiple Afghan, Argentine, Ethiopian, Peruvian, Turkish, Indian, Pakistani, and Vietnamese restaurants.

Restaurant Row, so-called because of the abundance of restaurants, is located on West 46th Street between Eighth and Ninth Avenues. There are more restaurants and food carts and trucks on Tenth Avenue between 43rd and 47th Streets.

=== USS Intrepid Museum ===
The Intrepid Sea, Air & Space Museum is located at Hudson River Pier 86, 46th Street. Besides the aircraft carrier USS Intrepid, the museum exhibits the cruise missile submarine USS Growler, a Concorde SST, a Lockheed A-12 supersonic reconnaissance plane, the Space Shuttle Enterprise, a Soyuz descent module, and other items.

== Parks and recreation ==
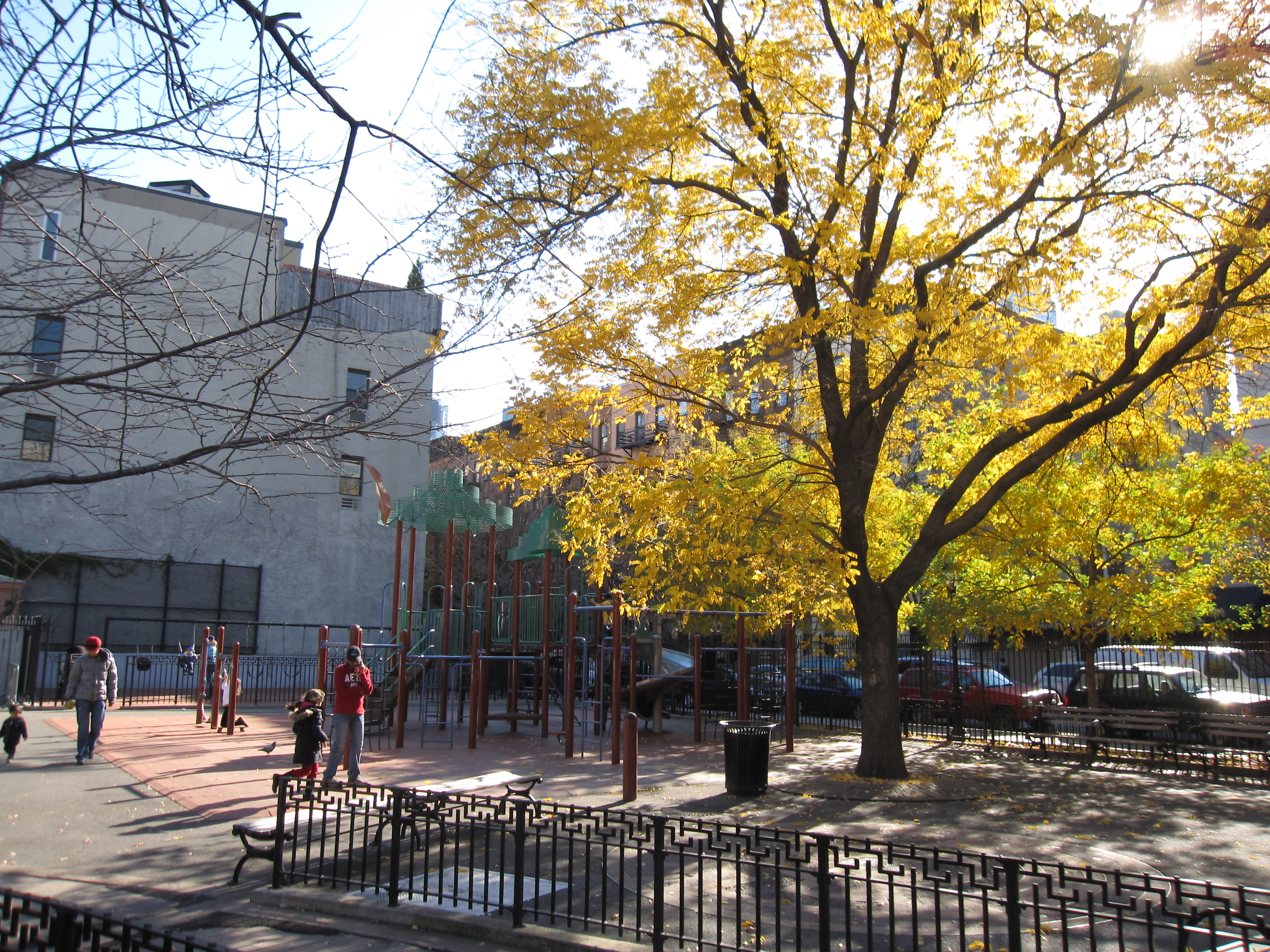
Hell's Kitchen Park

Hell's Kitchen's side streets are mostly lined with trees. The neighborhood does not have many parks or recreational areas, though smaller plots have been converted into green spaces.

One such park is DeWitt Clinton Park on Eleventh Avenue between 52nd and 54th Streets. It is across the West Side Highway from Clinton Cove Park. Another is Hell's Kitchen Park, built in the 1970s on a former parking lot on 10th Avenue between 47th and 48th Streets.

A newer park in Hell's Kitchen is the Hudson Park and Boulevard, which is part of the Hudson Yards Redevelopment Project.

The 100 by 150 ft (30 by 46 m) Clinton Community Garden is located on West 48th Street between Ninth and Tenth Avenues, and consists of 108 plots. Previously a haven for illegal activity, in 1978 the West 48th Street Block Association joined with the Green Guerillas to secure a lease for the site to renovate it for community use. When the city put it up for auction in 1981, residents formed the Committee to Save Clinton Community Garden, through appeals to Mayor Ed Koch and unsuccessful efforts to purchase the site.

In 1984, one month before the auction, Clinton Community Garden was transferred to the city's Parks Department, making it the first community garden to become parkland. It is open from dawn to dusk. Over 2,000 residents have keys to the park, which is used by an average of 500–600 people, including over 100 children, during the warm months. Recreational events include an annual Summer Solstice event, art shows, chamber music picnics, gardening seminars, and dance recitals. Residents have held weddings in the park, and photographers have used it for photo shoots.

== Police and crime ==
Hell's Kitchen is patrolled by two precincts of the NYPD. The area south of 42nd Street is patrolled by the 10th Precinct of the NYPD, located at 230 West 20th Street in Chelsea. The area north of 42nd Street is patrolled by the 18th (Midtown North) Precinct, located at 306 West 54th Street. In 2010, the 10th Precinct ranked 61st safest out of 69 NYC patrol areas for per-capita crime, while the Midtown North and Midtown South precincts ranked 69th safest out of 69 patrol areas for per-capita crime. As of 2018, with a non-fatal assault rate of 34 per 100,000 people, Hell's Kitchen and Chelsea's rate of violent crimes per capita was less than the city average. The incarceration rate of 313 per 100,000 people was lower than the city average.

The 10th Precinct has a lower crime rate than in the 1990s, with crimes across all categories having decreased by 69.3% between 1990 and 2023. The precinct reported no murders, 9 rapes, 135 robberies, 159 felony assaults, 137 burglaries, 759 grand larcenies, and 77 grand larcenies auto in 2023. The 18th Precinct also has a lower crime rate than in the 1990s, with crimes across all categories having decreased by 83.6% between 1990 and 2023. The precinct reported 3 murders, 9 rapes, 137 robberies, 184 felony assaults, 130 burglaries, 1,979 grand larcenies, and 83 grand larcenies auto in 2023.

== Fire safety ==
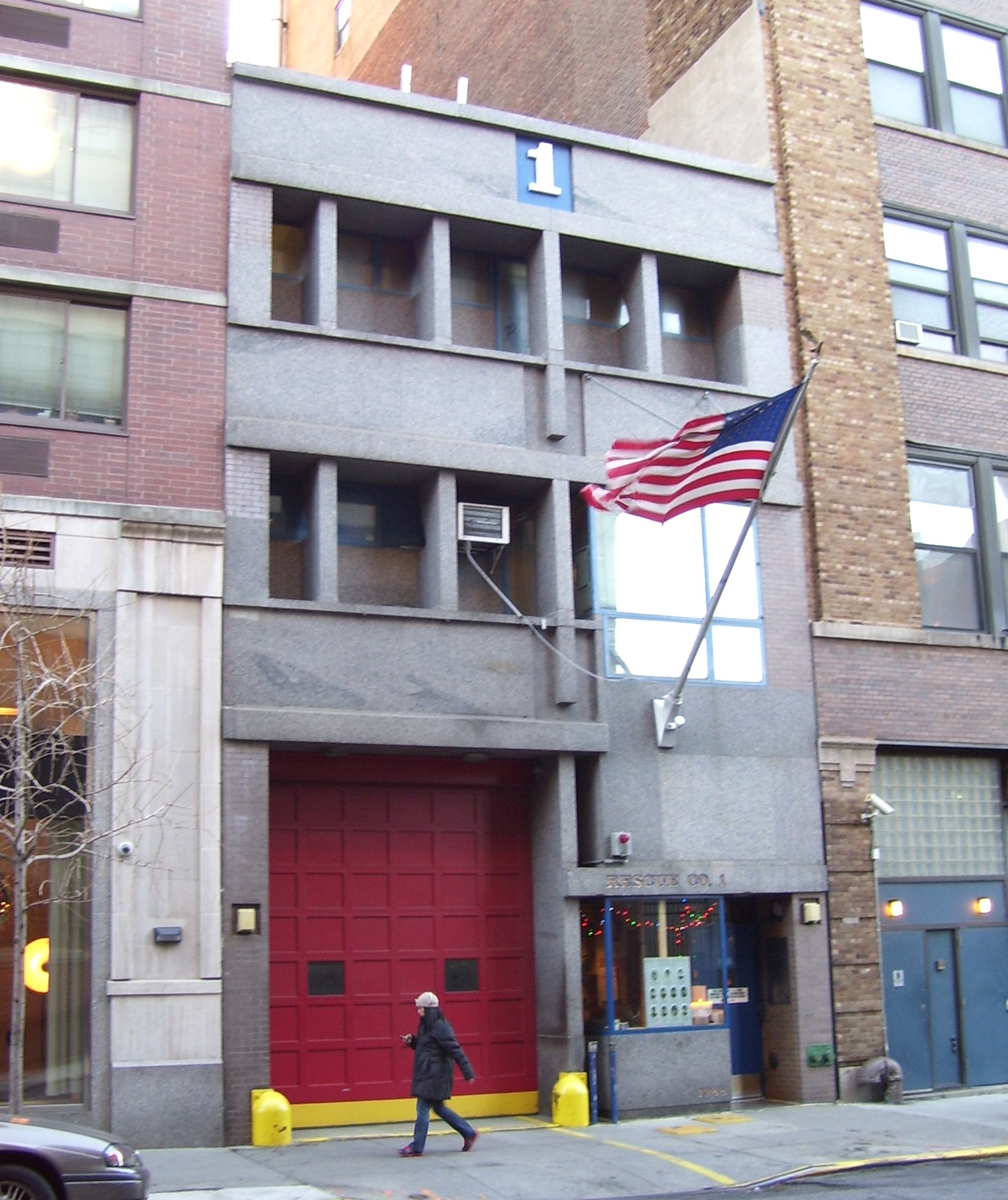
Quarters of New York City Fire Department Rescue 1

Hell's Kitchen is served by four New York City Fire Department (FDNY) fire stations:

- Rescue 1 – 530 West 43rd Street
- Engine Company 26 – 222 West 37th Street
- Engine Company 34/Ladder Company 21 – 440 West 38th Street
- Engine Company 54/Ladder Company 4/Battalion 9 – 782 8th Avenue

== Health ==
As of 2018, preterm births in Hell's Kitchen and Chelsea are the same as the city average, though births to teenage mothers are less common. In Hell's Kitchen and Chelsea, there were 87 preterm births per 1,000 live births (compared to 87 per 1,000 citywide), and 9.9 births to teenage mothers per 1,000 live births (compared to 19.3 per 1,000 citywide). Hell's Kitchen and Chelsea have a low population of residents who are uninsured. In 2018, this population of uninsured residents was estimated to be 11%, slightly less than the citywide rate of 12%.

In 2018, the concentration of fine particulate matter, the deadliest type of air pollutant, in Hell's Kitchen and Chelsea is 0.0098 mg/m^{3} (9.8×10^{−9} oz/ft^{3}), was more than the city average. Eleven percent of Hell's Kitchen and Chelsea residents were smokers in 2018, less than the city average of 14% of residents being smokers. In Hell's Kitchen and Chelsea, 10% of residents were obese in 2018, 5% were diabetic, and 18% had high blood pressure—compared to the citywide averages of 24%, 11%, and 28% respectively. In 2018, 14% of children were obese, compared to the citywide average of 20%.

Ninety-one percent of residents eat some fruits and vegetables every day, which is higher than the city's average of 87%. In 2018, 86% of residents described their health as "good", "very good", or "excellent", more than the city's average of 78%. For every supermarket in Hell's Kitchen and Chelsea, there are 7 bodegas.

The nearest major hospitals are Mount Sinai West in Hell's Kitchen, Bellevue Hospital Center and NYU Langone Medical Center in Kips Bay, and NewYork–Presbyterian Hospital on the Upper East Side.

== Post offices and ZIP Codes ==
Hell's Kitchen is located within three primary ZIP Codes. From north to south they are 10018 between 34th and 41st Streets, 10036 between 41st and 48th Streets, and 10019 between 48th and 59th Streets. The United States Postal Service operates three post offices in Hell's Kitchen:

- Radio City Station – 322 West 52nd Street
- RCU Annex Station – 340 West 42nd Street
- Midtown Station – 223 West 38th Street

The James A. Farley Station, the main post office for New York City, is located at 421 8th Avenue.

== Education ==
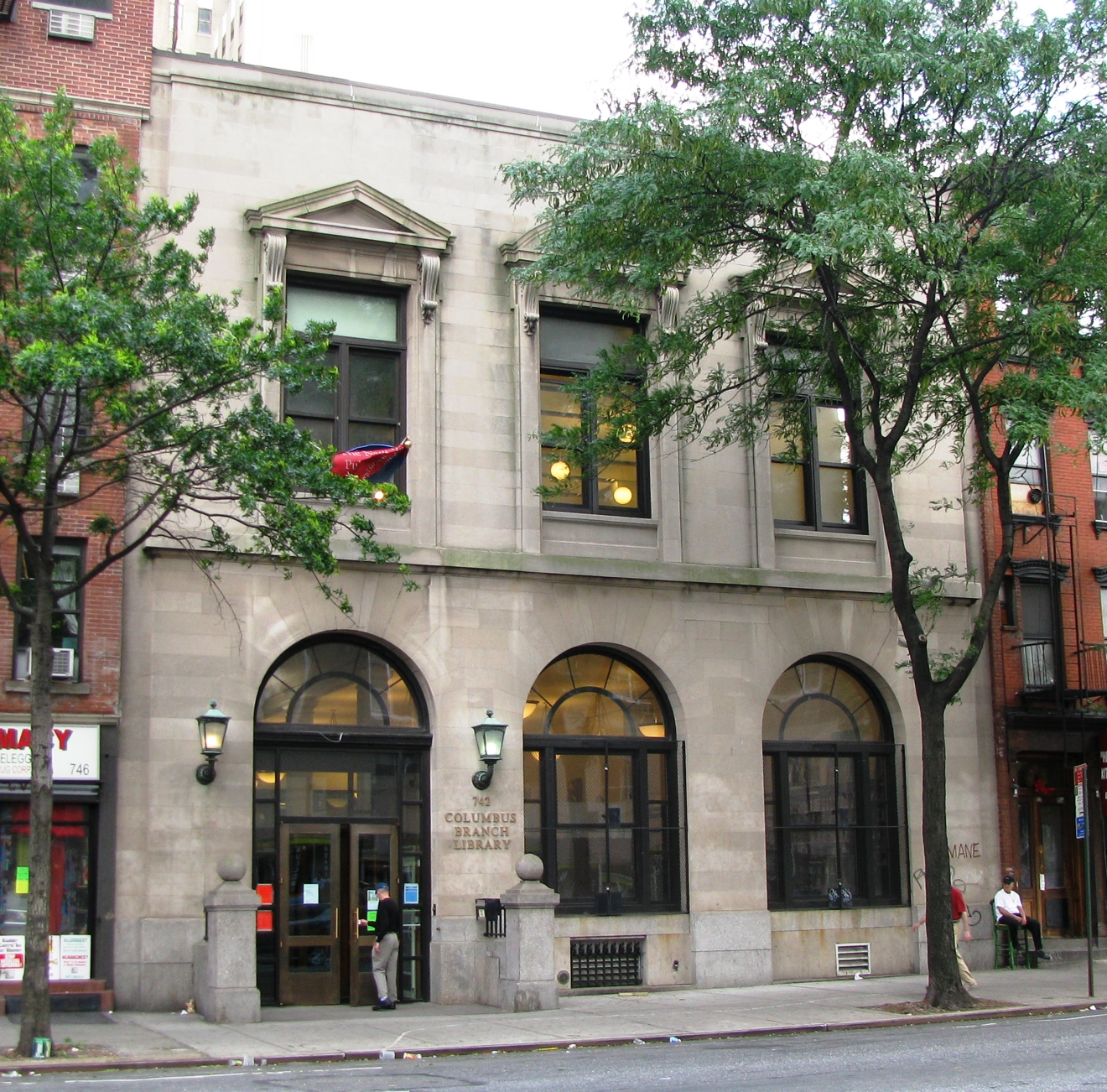
New York Public Library, Columbus branch

In 2018, Hell's Kitchen and Chelsea generally had a higher rate of college-educated residents than the rest of the city. In 2018, a majority of residents age 25 and older (78%) had a college education or higher, while 6% had less than a high school education. 17% were high school graduates or have some college education. By contrast, in 2018, 64% of Manhattan residents and 43% of city residents had a college education or higher. The percentage of Hell's Kitchen and Chelsea students excelling in math rose from 61% in 2000 to 80% in 2011, and reading achievement increased from 66% to 68% during the same time period.

In 2016, Hell's Kitchen and Chelsea's rate of elementary school student absenteeism was lower than the rest of New York City. In Hell's Kitchen and Chelsea, 16% of elementary school students missed twenty or more days per school year, less than the citywide average of 20%. In 2018, 81% of high school students in Hell's Kitchen and Chelsea graduated on time, more than the citywide average of 75%.

=== Schools ===
The New York City Department of Education operates the following public elementary schools in Hell's Kitchen as part of Community School District 2:

- P.S. 35 (grades K, 2-12)
- P.S. 51 Elias Howe (grades PK-5)
- P.S. 111 Adolph S Ochs (grades PK-5, 7-8)

The following high schools are located in Hell's Kitchen, serving grades 9-12 unless otherwise indicated:

- Business of Sports School
- Facing History School
- Food and Finance High School
- High School for Environmental Studies
- High School of Hospitality Management
- Independence High School
- Manhattan Bridges High School
- Professional Performing Arts School (grades 6-12)
- Urban Assembly Gateway School For Technology
- Urban Assembly School of Design and Construction
- The Beacon School

The Success Academy Charter Schools group opened an elementary school, Success Academy Hell's Kitchen, in the High School of Graphic Communication Arts building in 2013.

The Roman Catholic Archdiocese of New York operates Catholic schools in Manhattan. The Holy Cross School served the Hells Kitchen/Times Square area. In 2011, it had about 300 students. Some students originated from areas outside of New York City and outside New York State. In 2013 the archdiocese announced that the school was to close. The school had the possibility of remaining open if $720,000 in pledges to the school were obtained, and the school community almost got to the number. However, the school was closed anyway.

=== Library ===
The New York Public Library (NYPL) operates the Columbus branch at 742 10th Avenue. The Columbus branch was founded in 1901 as the Columbus Catholic Club's collection, and it became an NYPL branch in 1905. The current Carnegie library building opened in 1909 and was renovated in 2004–2005.

== Transportation ==
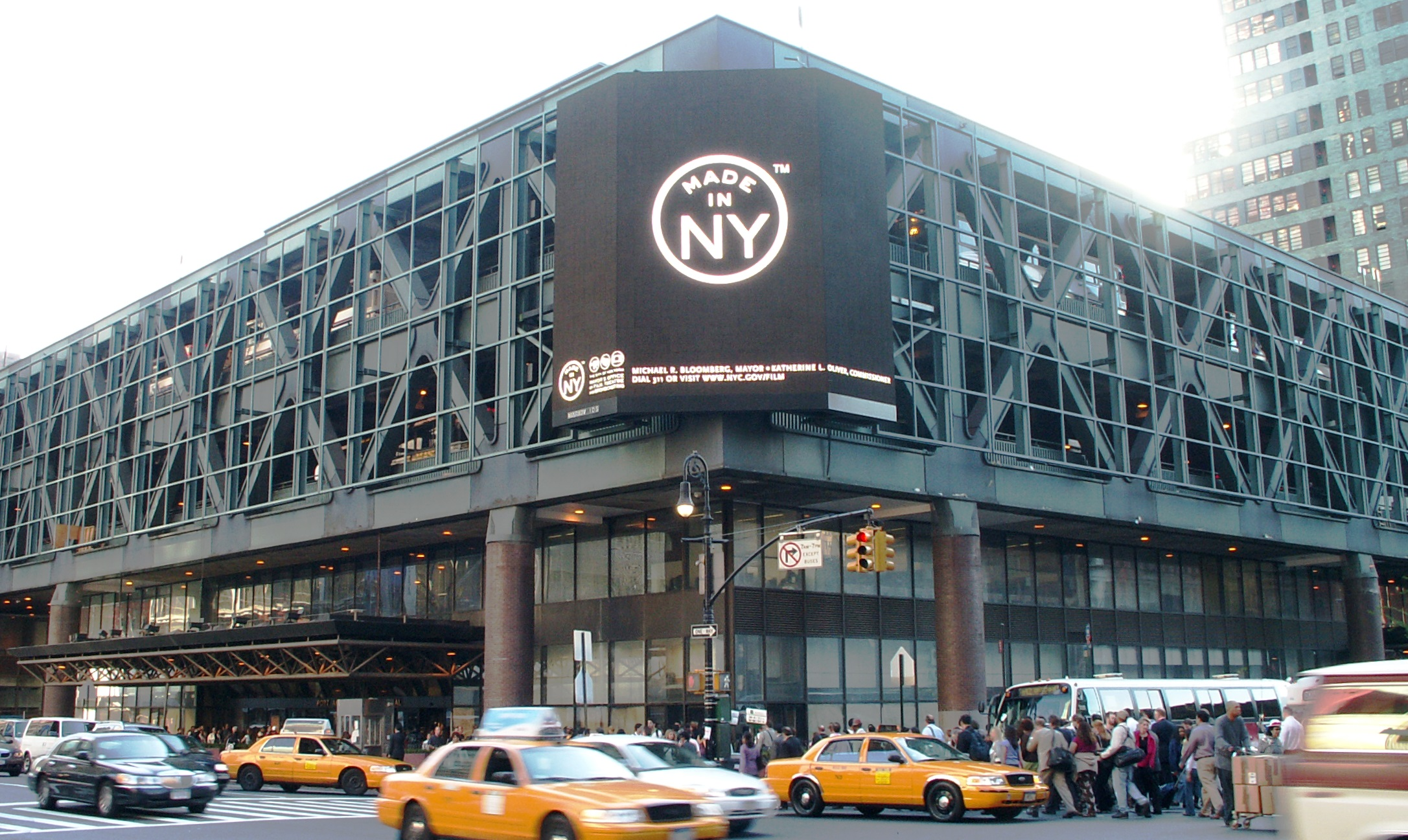
The Port Authority Bus Terminal at 42nd and Eighth Avenue

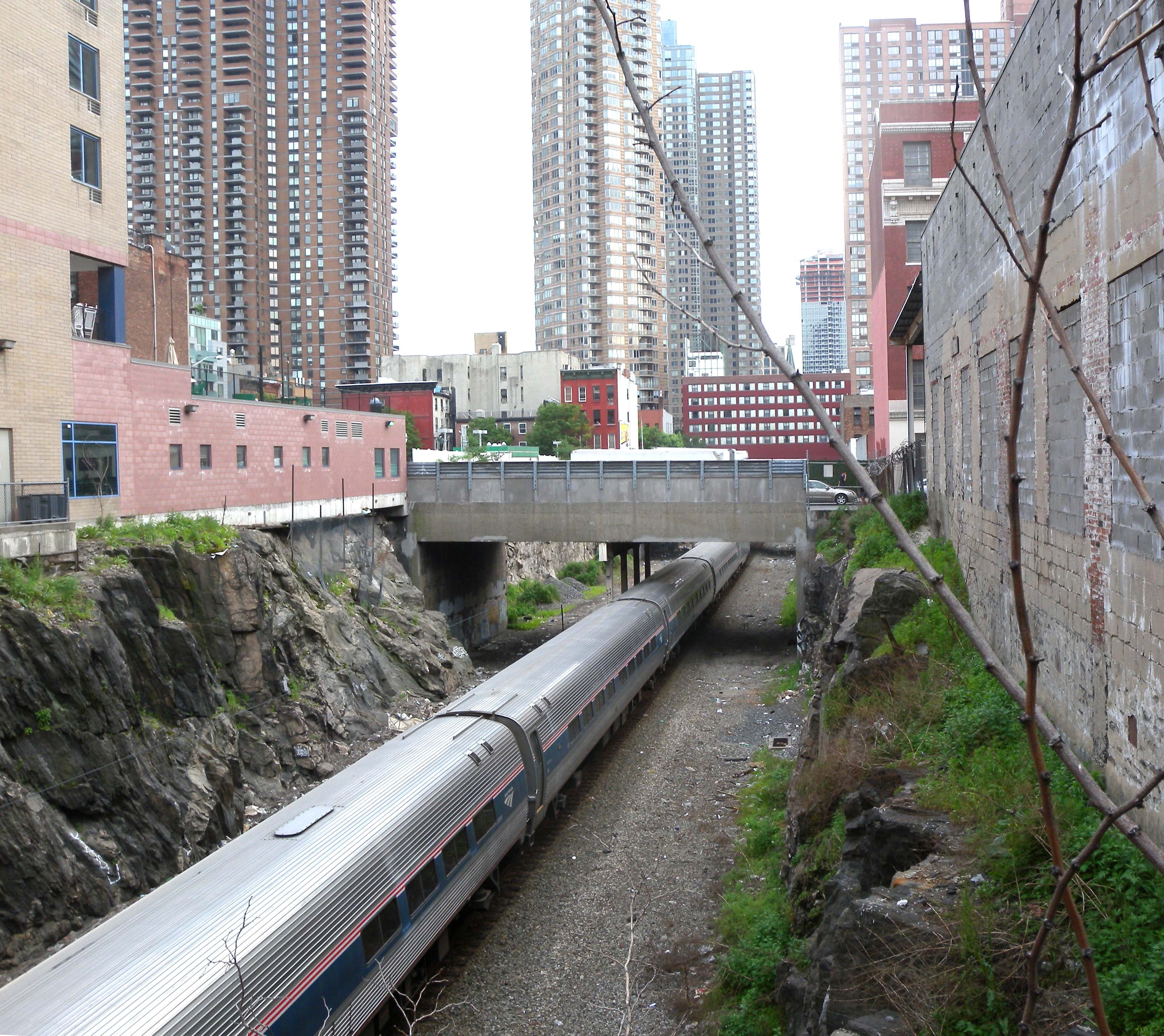
An Amtrak train in the Empire Connection trench

=== Public transport ===
Hell's Kitchen is bounded on the east by the New York City Subway's IND Eighth Avenue Line (A, C, and E trains). The MTA built the 7 Subway Extension (7 and <7> trains) for the aforementioned Hudson Yards development. The extension to 34th Street–Hudson Yards opened on September 13, 2015, making the IRT Flushing Line the westernmost New York City Subway line within Midtown.

Several New York City Bus routes, namely the M11, M12, M31, M34 SBS, M42 and M50, as well as express bus routes, service the area.

Ferry operations in the neighborhood include Circle Line Sightseeing Cruises at West 42nd Street. NY Waterway service is available at the West Midtown Ferry Terminal at 38th Street. Service on the St. George route of the NYC Ferry system will also begin serving 38th Street in 2020.

=== Private transport ===
The Lincoln Tunnel connects New York City to New Jersey. The tunnel consists of three vehicular tubes of varying lengths, with two traffic lanes in each tube. The center tube contains reversible lanes.

Parking lots dot the neighborhood, but are dwindling in quantity as developments are being built. Eleventh Avenue is lined with car dealerships, many of which claim to have the highest volume among all dealerships for their brands in the country.

Many of the horse-drawn carriages from Central Park stay in stables just off the West Side Highway. It is not uncommon to hear the sound of horses in the neighborhood. There have been calls for banning horse-drawn carriages, especially from Mayor of New York City Bill de Blasio following a handful of collisions between cars and carriages. The carriage horses live in stables originally built in the 19th century, but today contain modern design features such as fans, misting systems, box stalls, and sprinkler systems. The carriage horses live upstairs in their stables while the carriages are parked below on the ground floor.

=== Intercity and long-distance transport ===
The massive Port Authority Bus Terminal is between 40th and 42nd Streets and Eighth and Ninth Avenues. It serves numerous commuter and intercity routes, as well as airport shuttles and tour buses.

Cruise ships frequently dock at the New York Passenger Ship Terminal in the 48th to 52nd Street piers, respectively numbered Piers 88, 90, and 92. The piers originally built in 1930 are now considered small, and some cruise traffic uses other locations.

Located just southeast of Hell's Kitchen is Penn Station. It is the busiest railroad station in North America, with 600,000 Long Island Rail Road, NJ Transit Rail, and Amtrak passengers using the station on an average weekday as of 2013. One railroad line to Penn Station runs through the neighborhood, the Empire Connection, which is located in the sunken West Side Line west of Tenth Avenue. Parts of the trench have been covered over.

== In popular culture ==
=== Comics ===
- The Kitchen, an eight-issue Vertigo Comics miniseries, is a female-driven crime drama set in Hell's Kitchen.
- The Marvel superhero Matt Murdock / Daredevil was born and raised in Hell's Kitchen; further, most of the comic's run takes place in the area.

=== Books ===
- Nero Wolfe, the private detective featured in 74 stories by Rex Stout, lives in Hell's Kitchen on West 35th Street.
- The character Gail Wynand in Ayn Rand's 1943 novel The Fountainhead grew up in Hell's Kitchen. Several chapters in the book are extensive flashbacks to his childhood and youth there. At the end of the book, he buys up several blocks of Hell's Kitchen, in which to build the world's tallest skyscraper.
- Apollo, the protagonist from Rick Riordan's 2016 novel The Hidden Oracle, crashes in a Hell's Kitchen dumpster after being turned mortal, and meets and is saved from muggers by his companion Meg McCaffrey there.
- The titular character in Taylor Jenkins Reid's 2017 novel The Seven Husbands of Evelyn Hugo was born in Hell's Kitchen.
- City of Girls (2019) by Elizabeth Gilbert is set in Hell's Kitchen in the 1940s.
- Patrick Bateman in Bret Easton Ellis' American Psycho (1991) regularly disposed of his victims in Hell's Kitchen, as well as picking up several prostitutes, such as the returning character Christie.

=== Television ===
- Route 66 (1960–63), TV show – Buz Murdock, one of the lead characters, grew up in Hell's Kitchen.
- Daredevil and Daredevil: Born Again, adaptations of the comic series and character of the same name, are set in Hell's Kitchen. Matt Murdock's alter ego as a secretive and intimidating vigilante is first known to the public and various crime organizations as "The Man in Black" and later "The Devil of Hell's Kitchen" before his official branding as "Daredevil".
- Criminal Minds, In season one, episode 17, a victim of the latest Unsub was found dead in his art studio in Hell's Kitchen. Also, in season twelve, episode 18, “Hell’s Kitchen”, an urban vampire kidnaps victims from Hell’s Kitchen at night.
- The Westies (2026), TV show following the Irish crime syndicate known as the Westies, based almost entirely in Hell’s Kitchen.
- Dimension 20’s The Unsleeping City, in the episode Borough of Dreams, it is mentioned that the door to Hell is found in Hell’s Kitchen. Two characters, Kugrash and Ricky, go there as part of the campaign.

=== Film ===
- The Devil's Party (1938), a film by Ray McCarey based on the novel Hell's Kitchen Has a Pantry by Borden Chase, is set in Hell's Kitchen.
- Fail Safe (1964), film by Sidney Lumet.
- Taxi Driver (1976), film by Martin Scorsese, filmed and set largely in Hell's Kitchen.
- State of Grace (1990), film by Phil Joanou set in Hell's Kitchen
- Sleepers (1996), film by Barry Levinson based on Lorenzo Carcaterra's 1995 novel of the same name.
- In America (2002), film by Jim Sheridan, set in 1985. The family settles in Hell's Kitchen.
- Ash Wednesday (2002), by Edward Burns, set in the Hell's Kitchen of the early 1980s
- The Kitchen (2019), by Andrea Berloff, set in the Hell's Kitchen of the late 1970s.

=== Video games ===
- Deus Ex (2000) features a level set in Hell's Kitchen.

=== Music ===
- The album Falling into Infinity by Dream Theater contains an instrumental named "Hell's Kitchen".

== Notable residents ==
Notable current and former residents of Hell's Kitchen include:

- Michael Alig (1966–2020), founder of the Club Kids, lived at Riverbank West, at 11th Avenue, which he described as "the place where I lived as part of my salary at Limelight"; it was the address where he and his roommate, Robert "Freeze" Riggs, killed Andre "Angel" Melendez
- Carmelo Anthony (born 1984), basketball player
- Benjamin Appel (1907–1977), crime novelist
- Joaquin Badajoz (born 1972), poet, writer, and art critic
- Lewis Black (born 1948), comedian
- Anthony Bourdain (1956–2018), chef and author
- James J. Braddock ("Cinderella Man"), boxer, lived on West 48th Street
- James Cagney (1899–1986), actor
- George Cain (1943–2010), author of Blueschild Baby
- Yvette Calderon, Professor of Emergency Medicine
- Lorenzo Carcaterra (born 1954), author, born and raised in Hell's Kitchen, which is featured in his autobiographical story "A Safe Place" as well as the novel and later film Sleepers
- Vanessa Carlton (born 1980), singer-songwriter
- Paul Cavonis (born 1937), actor
- Timothée Chalamet (born 1995), actor, born and raised in Hell's Kitchen
- Richard Christy (born 1974), comedian, radio personality, and musician
- James Coonan (born 1946), mobster
- Marlon Craft (born 1993), rapper
- Larry David (born 1947), actor, producer of Seinfeld and Curb Your Enthusiasm
- Marcelo Gomes (born 1979), Brazilian ballet dancer
- Tom Gorman (1919–1986), Major League Baseball umpire
- Charlton Heston, (1923-2008), Academy Award Winning Actor
- Alicia Keys (born 1981), singer and pianist
- Mako Komuro and Kei, former Japanese Imperial family and her husband
- Kenny Kramer (born 1943), comedian, lived in a Hell's Kitchen apartment across the hall from Larry David and became the inspiration for the Cosmo Kramer character in Seinfeld.
- Stanley Kramer (1913–2001), film director and producer
- Hasan Minhaj (born 1985) comedian, writer, and political commentator
- Robert Mitchum (1917–1997), actor
- Daniel Patrick Moynihan (1927–2003), politician, sociologist, and diplomat
- Brian Mullen (born 1962), NHL hockey player
- Joe Mullen (born 1957), NHL hockey player
- Joakim Noah (born 1985), NBA basketball player
- Trevor Noah (born 1984), comedian & actor
- Paul O'Neill (1956–2017), producer and founder of Trans-Siberian Orchestra
- Jerry Orbach (1935–2004), actor. Kept an apartment on Eighth Avenue between 53rd and 54th Streets
- Tony Orlando (born 1944), singer
- Ilka Tanya Payán (1943–1996), actress and AIDS activist
- Josh Peck (born 1986), actor, was born and raised in Hell's Kitchen
- Mario Puzo (1920–1999), author of The Godfather
- George Raft (1901–1980), actor
- John Reed (born 1969), author
- Mickey Rourke (born 1953), actor
- Richie Scheinblum (1942–2021), Major League Baseball player
- Max Schneider (born 1992), singer-songwriter and actor
- Kevin Spacey (born 1959), actor
- Vincent Speranza (1925–2023), WW2 veteran and hero of the siege of Bastogne, born and raised in the Hell's Kitchen neighborhood
- Mickey Spillane (1933–1977), mobster
- Sylvester Stallone (born 1946), actor who was born and raised in the area
- Lisa Velez (born 1966), singer of Lisa Lisa and Cult Jam
- Bruce Willis (born 1955), actor, lived at West 49th Street and Tenth Avenue as a struggling actor
- Andrew Yang (born 1975), businessman, attorney, lobbyist, 2020 Democratic Party presidential and 2021 New York City Democratic mayoral candidate
