= Hell's Kitchen Park =

Public park in Manhattan, New York

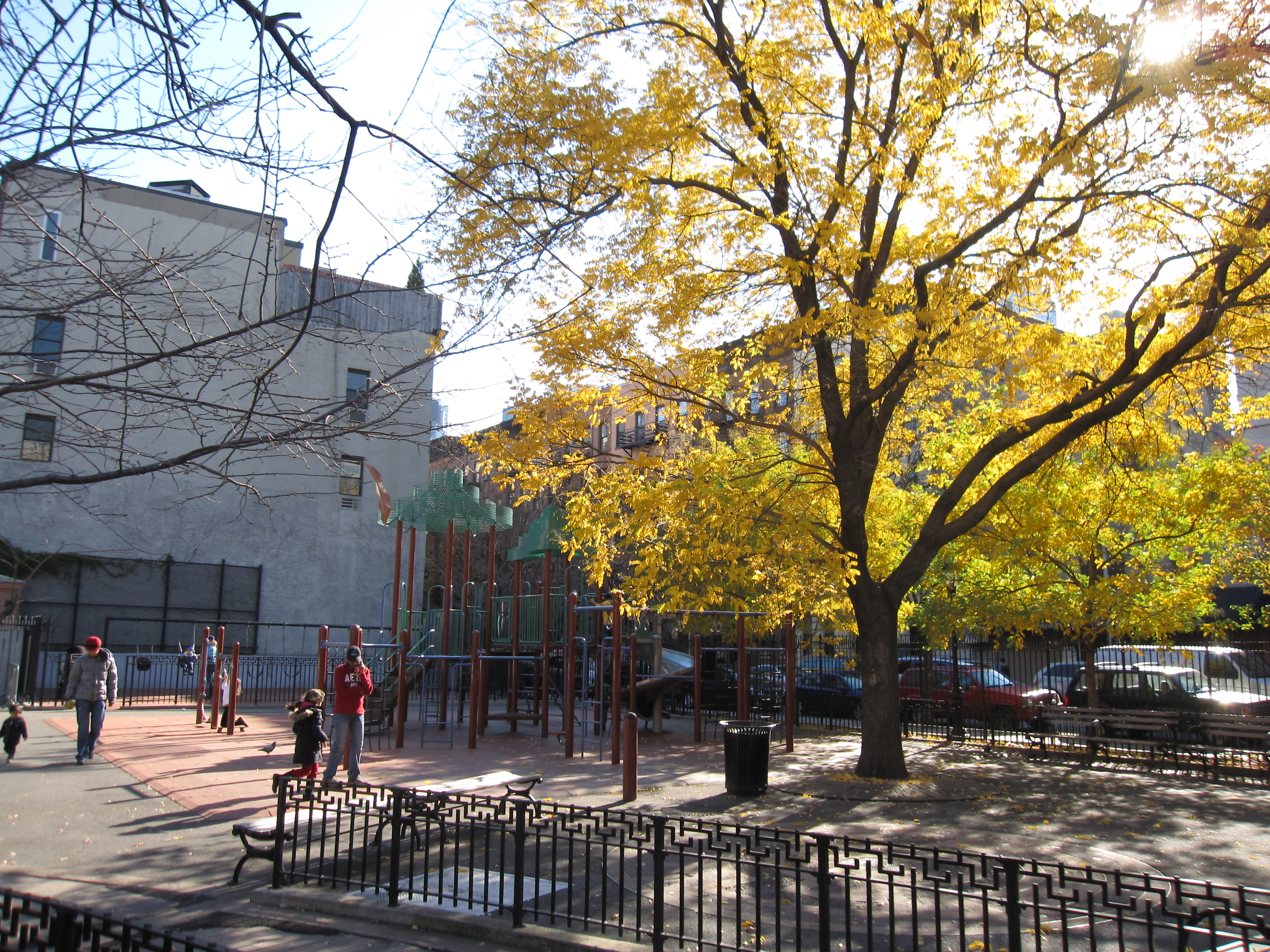
- Hell's Kitchen Park (Fall 2010)
- Interactive map of Hell's Kitchen Park
- Location: Hell's Kitchen
- Nearest city: Manhattan
- Coordinates: 40°45′46.6″N 73°59′33.3″W
- Area: 0.58-acre (0.23 ha)
- Created: December 4, 1979

Hell's Kitchen Park is a 0.58-acre (0.23 ha) park in Hell's Kitchen in Manhattan, New York City.

== History ==
In the 1960s, there were very few open spaces in Hell's Kitchen. Residents complained about this, so the civic authorities thought of possibly building parkland on a parking lot on Tenth Avenue between West 47th and 48th Street. On June 23, 1966, the Board of Estimate approved the acquisition and condemned the parking lot. The New York state government allocated $400,000 to acquire the lot in September 1966. However, because land studies delayed the project for several years, the playground did not open until December 4, 1979.

The West 47th Street Block Association and other residents collaborated to keep the park safe in the 1980s. They did so by holding gatherings, getting lights installed on adjoining buildings, and advocating for a fence, which was built in the late 1980s. In 2005, the park was reconstructed with $1.2 million allocated by Council member for the 3rd District, Christine Quinn.
