= Yvette Calderon =

American physician

- Education: Brown University; Albert Einstein College of Medicine
- Scientific career
- Workplaces: Jacobi Medical Center; Englewood Hospital and Medical Center; Icahn School of Medicine at Mount Sinai; Jefferson Health System

Yvette Calderon is an American physician who is Chair of the Department of Emergency Medicine for Jefferson Health System. Her research has focused on health disparities in Manhattan, with a particular focus on HIV and hepatitis C. She was elected to the National Academy of Medicine in 2022.

== Early life and education ==
Calderon was raised in a housing project in Hell's Kitchen. Her parents both emigrated to Manhattan from Puerto Rico. Her father was a member of Borinqueneers, the 65th Infantry Regiment who served during the Korean War. She was mentored by a philanthropist who created a program to keep students off the streets, and had the opportunity to visit the Mount Sinai Health System. She eventually attended Brown University, then earned her medical degree at the Albert Einstein College of Medicine. She completed her internship in internal medicine at Englewood Hospital and Medical Center, before moving to the Jacobi Medical Center for her residency.

== Research and career ==
Calderon started her career at the Jacobi Medical Center. Her career has focused on elimination of HIV/AIDS amongst at-risk populations and underserved communities. In the 2010s in The Bronx, where Calderon spent part of her childhood, over 23,000 people were living with HIV/AIDS, and around one quarter were not aware they were carrying the virus. Calderon made HIV testing part of routine medical care in NYC Health + Hospitals. She developed Behavioral Intervention-Rapid HIV Testing Education & Follow-Up (BRIEF), which looked to improve awareness of HIV through rapid testing. BRIEF was the first multi-media based approach to educate about and prevent HIV. She was appointed as Assistant Dean of Diversity Enhancement at the Albert Einstein College of Medicine, where she developed mentorship programs. She was appointed Chair of the Department of Emergency medicine at the Icahn School of Medicine at Mount Sinai in 2015, and medical director of emergency services at the North Central Bronx Hospital in 2016.

During the COVID-19 pandemic, Calderon was Chair of the Department of Emergency Medicine at the Mount Sinai Beth Israel Hospital. Calderon's father died from the disease. This motivated her to ensure all hospitalized COVID-19 patients would be able to hear the voice of people they knew. She investigated health disparities during COVID-19, and tried to persuade reluctant community members to get the vaccine.

Calderon developed the first digital HIV diagnostic and counseling program, which has been deployed in various clinical settings.

== Awards and honors ==
- 2003 Inducted into Leo M. Davidoff Society
- 2013 The Linda Laubenstein Award for Excellence in HIV care
- 2015 Bronx Influential Women Awards
- 2015 New York City Health and Hospital Corporation: Doctor’s Day Award
- 2019 Crain Communications Notable Women in Healthcare
- 2021 Crain’s New York Champion of Change Award
- 2022 Elected Fellow of the National Academy of Medicine

== Selected publications ==
- Finitsis, David J.; Pellowski, Jennifer A.; Johnson, Blair T. (2014-02-05). "Text Message Intervention Designs to Promote Adherence to Antiretroviral Therapy (ART): A Meta-Analysis of Randomized Controlled Trials". PLOS ONE. 9 (2) e88166. Bibcode:2014PLoSO...988166F. doi:10.1371/journal.pone.0088166. ISSN 1932-6203. PMC 3914915. PMID 24505411.
- Berger, Jeffrey S.; Eisen, Lewis; Nozad, Valerie; D’Angelo, John; Calderon, Yvette; Brown, David L.; Schweitzer, Paul (2005-08-01). "Competency in electrocardiogram interpretation among internal medicine and emergency medicine residents". The American Journal of Medicine. 118 (8): 873–880. doi:10.1016/j.amjmed.2004.12.004. ISSN 0002-9343. PMID 16084180.
- Calderon, Yvette (2011-05-01). "Educational Effectiveness of an HIV Pretest Video for Adolescents: A Randomized Controlled Trial". Pediatrics. 127 (5): 911–916. doi:10.1542/peds.2010-1443. PMC 3081187. PMID 21482613.
