= Joan of Aza =

Mother of St. Dominic

Blessed Juana de Aza
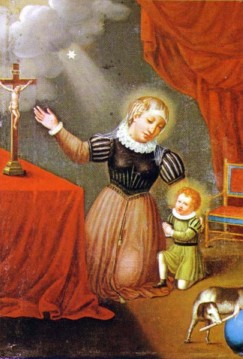
- Juana de Aza with her son St Dominic

Mother of St Dominic de Guzman
- Born: c.1135 Haza, Spain
- Died: August 4, 1205 (aged ~70); Caleruega, Spain
- Venerated in: Roman Catholic Church
- Beatified: 1 October 1828 (confirmation of cultus), Rome, Papal States by Pope Leo XII
- Feast: August 2
- Attributes: halo, with her sons St. Dominic and Bl. Mannes (mostly depicted as young boys), a dog with a torch in its mouth, sometimes wearing a crown or tiara, book, resting on a chair

Juana de Aza is the name gradually developed in hagiographical tradition for the mother of Saint Dominic and Bl. Manés de Guzmán. In the final form of this tradition, she is said to have been born in about 1135 in Haza and to have died at Caleruega (Dominic's birthplace) on 4 August 1205. Juana de Aza was beatified in 1828.

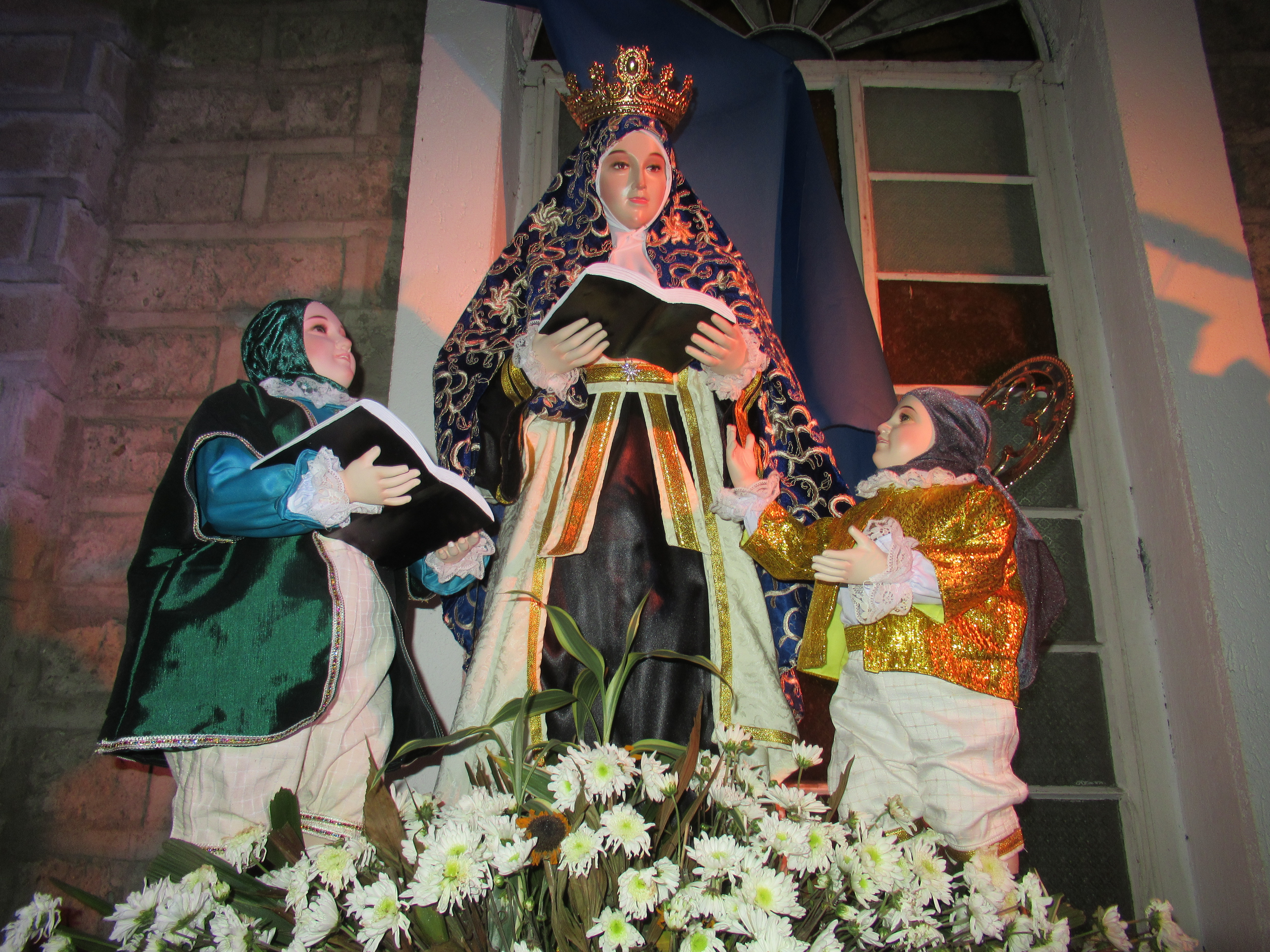
Joan of Aza

== Legend ==
In the earliest biography of Dominic, by Jordan of Saxony, Dominic's parents are not named, but the story is told that before his birth his mother dreamed that a dog leapt from her womb carrying a torch in its mouth and set the world aflame. Jordan adds that Dominic was brought up by his parents and a maternal uncle who was an archbishop. A later source, still of the 13th century, gives the names of Dominic's mother and father as Juana and Felix. Nearly a century after Dominic's birth, a local author asserts that Dominic's father was vir venerabilis et dives in populo suo ("an honoured and wealthy man in his village"); later hagiographers, elaborating on this, gradually developed identities for his father, said to be a member of the local noble family Guzmán and for his mother, who was eventually attached to the neighbouring noble Aza family.

Nothing is known of her childhood, but she probably married at a customarily young age. She and her husband, Felix, had four sons and a daughter. When the two older boys were grown, she went to the Abbey church at Silos to pray for another son. She is said to have had a dream in which St. Dominic of Silos told her that she would have a son, who would be a shining light to the Church. She decided to name the child Dominic.

According to Dominican tradition, his mother later saw the moon on his forehead, yet at his baptism, his godmother perceived it as a star. The boy was named probably after Saint Dominic of Silos whose nearby shrine was a favorite of his mother.
