= Libellus de principiis =

Libellus de principiis Ordinis Praedicatorum or simply Latin: Libellus de principiis English: On the beginnings of the Order of Preacher) is a work written by Jordan of Saxony on Saint Dominic and the beginnings of the Dominican Order of Preachers. It was written around 1233.

== Editions ==
- J. Quétif, J. Échard, ed. (1719). Scriptores Ordinis Praedicatorum (in Latin). Vol. 1. Paris.
- B. Iordano, ed. (1733). Acta Sanctorum (in Latin). Vol. 1. pp. 545–559.
- J. J. Berthier, ed. (1891). Jordanis de Saxonia opera ad res Ordinis Praedicatorum spectantia (in Latin). Friborg.
- H. C. Scheeben (ed.). Monumenta Ordinis Fratrum Praedicatorum Historica (in Latin). Vol. 16. pp. 25–88.

== See also ==
- Acta Sanctorum
