= Amata (nun) =

Italian Dominican nun

Blessed Amata OP
- Born: Rome, Italy
- Died: 1270; Bologna, Italy
- Venerated in: Roman Catholic Church
- Beatified: 24 December 1891, Saint Peter's Basilica, Papal States by Leo XIII
- Major shrine: Convent of Saint Agnes, Bologna
- Feast: June 10

...Blessed Diana d'Andalò and the other two members of the community who were beautified with her personify the three essential graces of monastic life: Amata, deep humility, Cecilia, the prioress, wise and creative authority; Diana, the greatest grace of them all, perfect love.

— Gerald Vann, OP

Amata, OP was a Dominican nun who co-founded the Convent of St. Agnes in Bologna, Italy.

== Biography ==
Little is known of Amata, although she is always associated with Diana degli Andalò and Cecilia Cesarini. Modern historians claim she did not exist, but her relics are buried with her companions at Bologna. There was another Amata, who was healed by Saint Dominic when he cast out seven devils from her, but it was probably not this Amata. Her name has been removed from the Latin martyrology.

Amata, along with Diana and Cecilia, knew Dominic personally. She was his good friend; according to legend, he gave her the name Amata, which means "beloved". She and Cecilia were from the monastery at San Sisto Vecchio in Rome, during the time of Dominic's reforms, which he convinced her to enter. In 1224, he either sent her with the other two nuns, during a time of reform, to Bologna to found St. Agnes Convent, or he was instrumental in allowing her to stay both there and at San Sisto.

Amata was buried with Diana and Cecilia at St. Agnes, although their relics were transferred several times but always together. Mary Jean Dorcy, who wrote a book detailing the biographies of saints from the Dominican order, said that both Dominic's naming and her burial with Diana and Cecilia "will have to be her title to honor".

== Veneration ==
Amata, along with Diana and Cecilia, were beatified in 1891 by Pope Leo XIII. Different sources cite different feast days for her: June 8, according to the Dominican martyrology, June 9, and June 10.
