= Diana degli Andalò =

Dominican nun

Blessed Diana degli Andalò O.P.
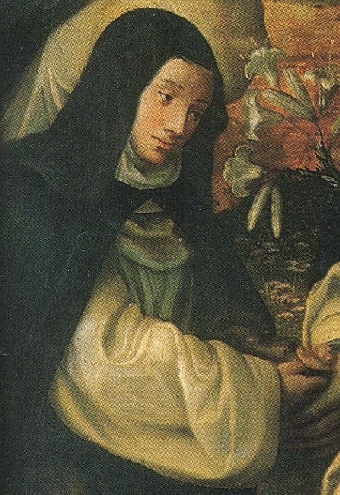

Nun
- Born: 1201; Bologna, Italy
- Died: 10 June 1236 (aged 35); Bologna, Italy
- Venerated in: Catholic Church
- Beatified: 8 August 1888, Saint Peter's Basilica, Papal States by Pope Leo XIII
- Major shrine: Convent of Saint Agnes, Bologna
- Feast: 10 June
- Attributes: lily

...She [Diana] and the other two members of the community who were beatified with her personify the three essential graces of monastic life: Amata, deep humility, Cecilia, the prioress, wise and creative authority; Diana, the greatest grace of them all, perfect love.

— Gerald Vann, O.P.

Diana degli Andalò, OP (1201 – 10 June 1236), sometimes d'Andalo, was a Dominican nun who founded a convent in Italy dedicated to Saint Agnes.

== Biography ==
Diana d'Andalò was born into a powerful Roman family in Bologna, Italy in 1201. She is described as having been "rather spoiled". She was "of outstanding beauty", charming, eloquent, well-educated, high spirited, courageous, and had good judgment. Dominican scholar Gerald Vann writes that she was "full of the joy of living, full too of the joy of her own beauty and the power it gave her".

In 1218, Diana heard the Dominican scholar and preacher Reginald of Orleans speak in Bologna. His sermons inspired her to give up her "worldliness" and devote herself to prayer. Following Reginald's advice, she remained at her family's home and continued to wear the clothes appropriate to her standing, although she wore an iron chain and hairshirt under them. In 1219, Saint Dominic came to Bologna; he received her vow of virginity and she proclaimed her intention to join the Dominican order as soon as a convent was established in Bologna.

She persuaded her father to purchase the lands to build a convent, but he refused to allow her to enter it, probably because the family intended that she marry into another prominent family, and the bishop denied permission to build on the site chosen. In 1222, she ran away to an Augustinian convent in Ronzano. Her family forcibly retrieved her and brought her back home; one of her ribs was broken, an almost fatal injury from which she never fully recovered. Dominic died shortly afterwards, but after she recovered from her injuries, she again escaped to Ronzano in 1223; her family did not come after her a second time.

Shortly after Dominic's death, his successor Jordan of Saxony met Diana when he came to Bologna. With his assistance, Diana reconciled with her family, her father agreed to allow her to enter religious life, and the bishop agreed to another site for the convent. In 1223, the Convent of St. Agnes in Bologna was established, and Diana entered the Dominican order. Four other nuns were also brought from the Convent of St. Sixtus at Rome, including Cecilia Cesarini, who was made prioress, and Amata; the three are always associated together. Diana remained at St. Agnes until her death in 1236, and was buried there, along with the remains of Cecilia and Amata.

== Veneration ==
Diana was equivalently beatified in 1888, and together with Cecilia Cesarini and Amata was more formally recognized by Pope Leo XIII in 1891. The relics of Diana, Cecilia, and Amata were moved several times, but always together. Diana's head was placed in a reliquary near Dominic's tomb. Her feast day is June 10.

== Letters ==
Diana is known for a series of letters written to her and to the other sisters at the Convent of St. Agnes by Jordan of Saxony; 37 of the 50 letters that have survived were written directly to her. They are "evidence of the deep friendship shared by Diana and Jordan and demonstrate the possibility of warm affection" between priests and the cloistered nuns that pray for them and their work. The letters are also a record of the early history of the Dominican Order. Gerald Vann, author of the book To Heaven with Diana!, a compilation of the correspondence between Diana and Jordan, calls the letters "a wonderful treatise on Christian friendship".

== Works cited ==
- Vann, Gerald (2006). To Heaven with Diana!: A Study of Jordan of Saxony and Diana d'Andalò. New York: iUniverse. ISBN 0-595-38586-9. OCLC 931336962
