= Haza, Province of Burgos =

Coordinates: 41°37′N 3°49′W

Haza
- Municipality and town
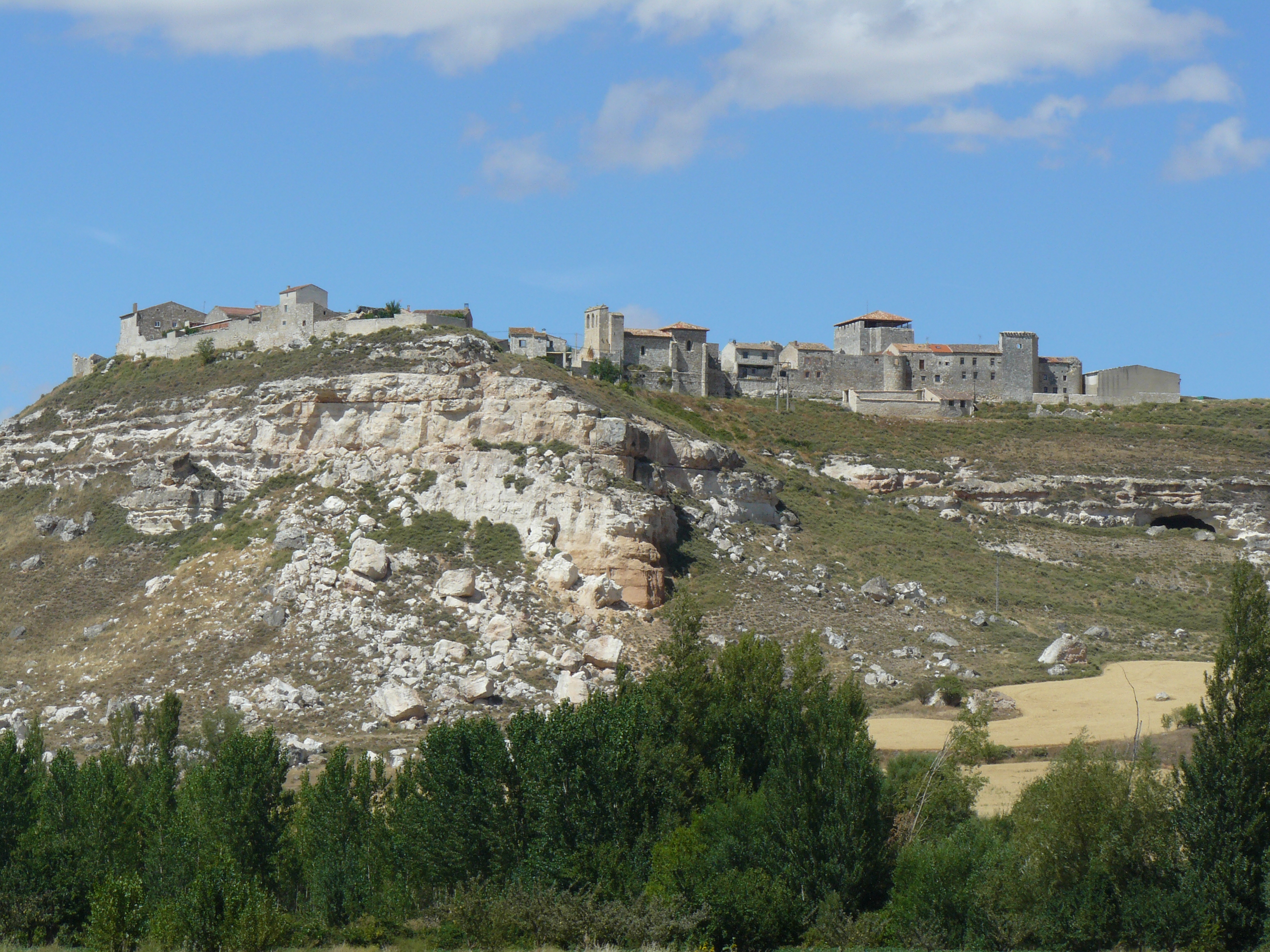
- View of Haza, 2011

- Flag Coat of arms
- Interactive map of Haza
- Country: Spain
- Autonomous community: Castile and León
- Province: Burgos
- Comarca: Ribera del Duero

Area
  - Total: 83.45 km^{2} (32.22 sq mi)
- Elevation: 910 m (2,990 ft)

Population (2025-01-01)
  - Total: 33
  - Density: 0.40/km^{2} (1.0/sq mi)
- Time zone: UTC+1 (CET)
  - Summer (DST): UTC+2 (CEST)
- Postal code: 09316
- Website: www.haza.es

Haza (formerly Aza) is a municipality located in the province of Burgos, Castile and León, Spain.

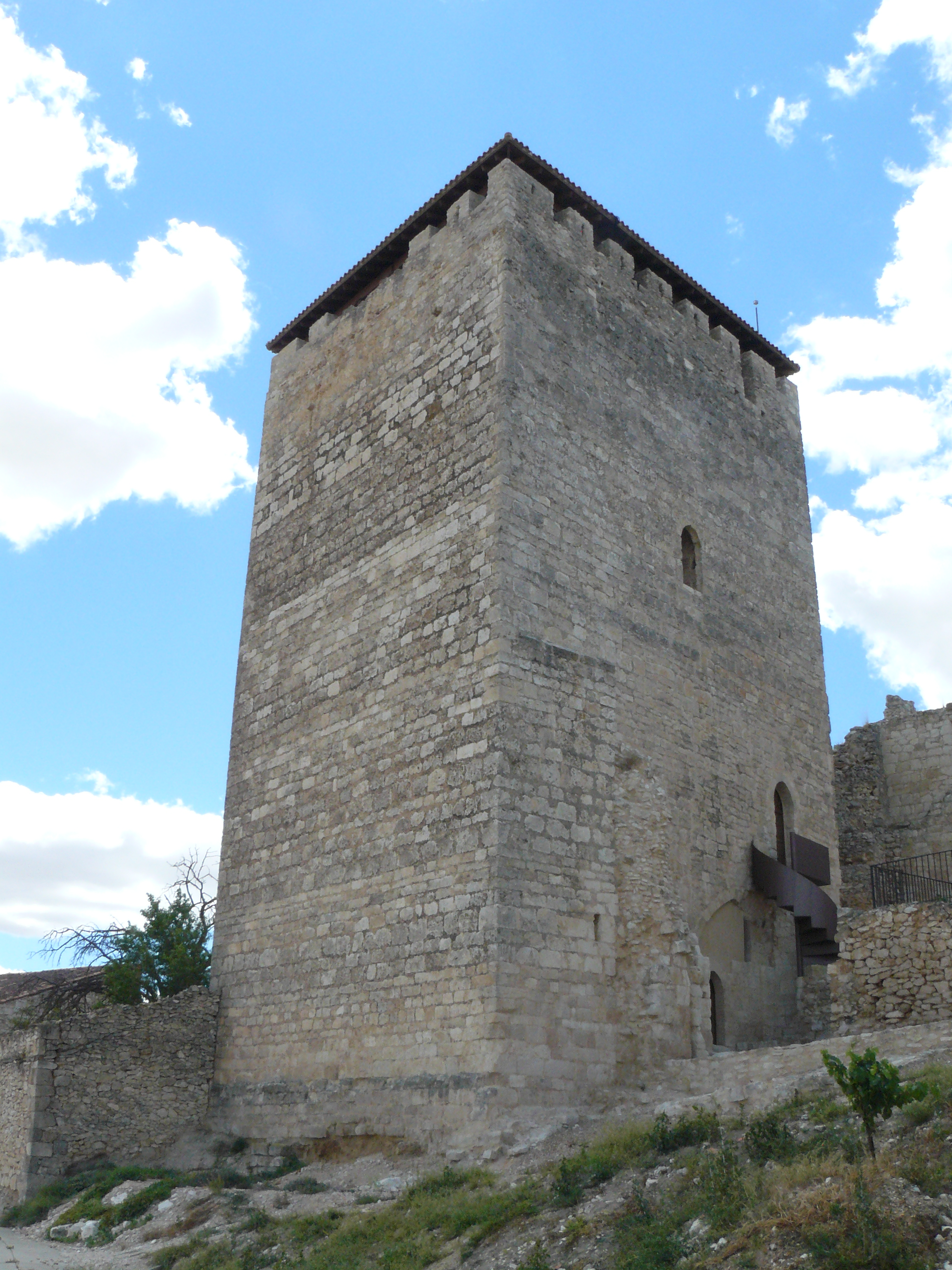
Keep of the castle of Haza

== People from Haza ==
- Joan of Aza (c. 1135 - August 2, 1205) - Catholic Saint and mother of Saint Dominic.
