= Manés de Guzmán =

Spanish Dominican friar

Blessed Manés de Guzmán OP
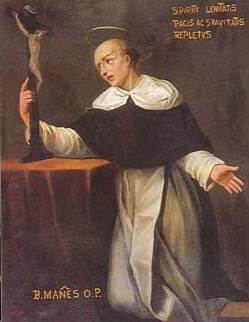

Priest
- Born: Manés de Guzmán y Aza c. 1166; Caleruega, Burgos, Spain
- Died: 1235 (aged 68–69); Gumiel de Izán, Burgos, Spain
- Venerated in: Roman Catholic Church
- Beatified: 2 June 1834 (cultus confirmation), Saint Peter's Basilica, Papal States by Pope Gregory XVI
- Feast: 30 July; 18 August (Dominican Order)

Manés de Guzmán, OP (c. 1166 – 1235) (Spanish: [ɡuθˈman]), was a Castilian Dominican priest beatified in the Roman Catholic Church. His younger brother, Domingo de Guzmán was the founder of the Order of Preachers, whom he helped in his reforming aims throughout his life.

== Biography ==
Manés was the second son of Félix de Guzmán and Juana de Aza. He was educated by his parents and his uncle Don Gonzalo de Aza in Gumiel de Izán. He wanted to enter a Cistercian monastery in the region of Caleruega, but was rejected.

When his brother founded the Order of Preachers, he joined them eventually becoming one of its first members; with an introverted and humble temperament, he helped his brother in the consolidation and expansion of the order. On 15 August 1217, Dominic ordered the friars of Prouille to disperse throughout Europe and settle there, growing the order, already confirmed by Pope Honorius III.

He was sent to Paris with other Spanish friars and there collaborated in the foundation of the Convent of Saint-Jacques-du-Haut-Pas. There he preached against the Albegensian heresy. Later on, his brother Dominic arranged for him, accompanied by Fra Miquel de Fabra, to make a trip to Spain in order to consolidate and strengthen the new houses of the Order in his country of origin. In 1219, his brother entrusted him with the care of the Dominican nuns of the Convent of Madrid.

After the death and canonization of his brother on 3 July 3, 1234, Manés returned to Caleruega to promote the construction of a church in the birthplace of the new saint, which would later become a monastery for nuns.

He died in the Monastery of San Pedro de Gumiel de Izán and was buried there, where some members of his family were already buried, including his mother, Juana de Aza. As he enjoyed a reputation for sanctity, he was buried with all kinds of honors. When the Dominicans began to venerate him, his relics were transferred from his family pantheon to the main altar, where they were exposed for public veneration, together with many others from other saints, brought from Cologne.

He was beatified eventually on 2 June 1834 by Pope Gregory XVI; his feast day is either July 30 or August 18.
