= Reginald of Orleans =

Italian friar

Blessed Réginald of Orleans OP
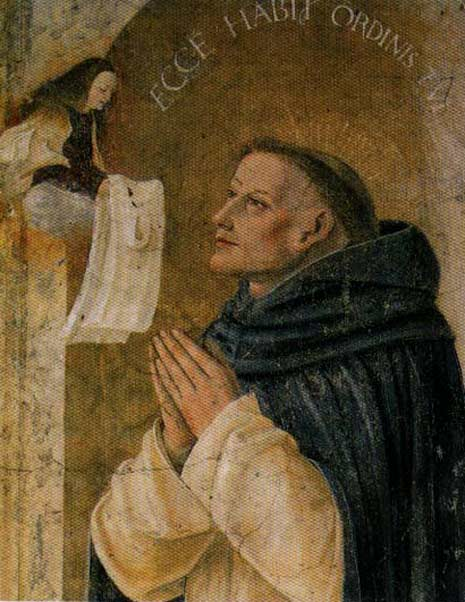

Priest
- Born: c. 1180; Orléans, Loiret, France
- Died: 1 February or 30 June 1220 (aged 40); Paris, France
- Venerated in: Roman Catholic Church
- Beatified: 15 February 1877 by, Saint Peter's Basilica, Rome by Pope Pius IX
- Feast: 1 February

Reginald of Orleans (c. 1180 – 30 June 1220) was an Italian Dominican friar and Catholic priest. He was one of the earliest members and a close collaborator of Saint Dominic.

== Biography ==
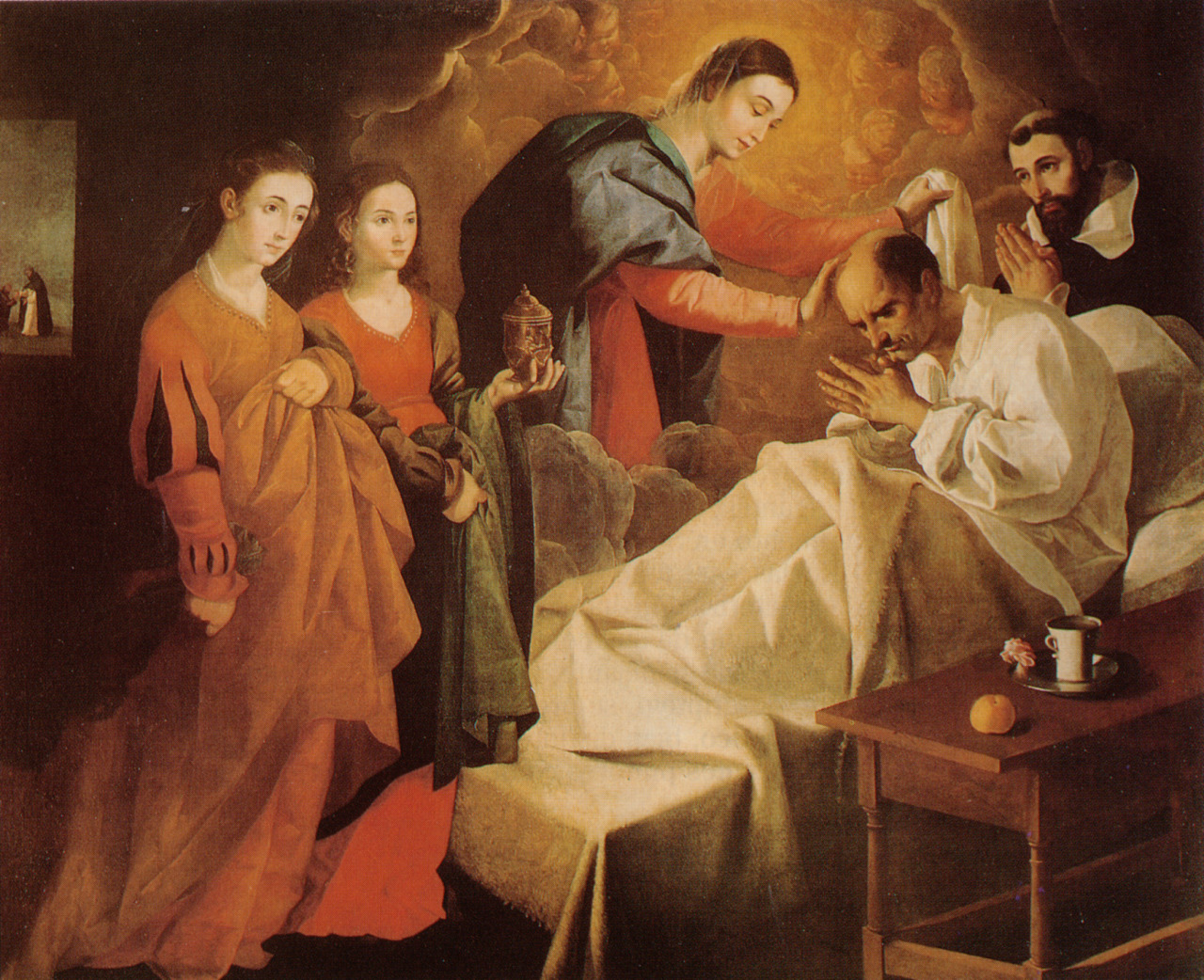
The Miraculous Healing of the Blessed Reginald of Orleans (painting by Francisco de Zurbarán, 1626).

After being a professor of canon law at Quartier de la Sorbonne, Paris for many years, Reginald became dean of the collegiate church of Saint-Agnan in Orléans. In 1216, he decided to follow Bishop Manasses de Seignelay who was to meet Pope Honorius III in Rome, before making a pilgrimage to Jerusalem.

In Rome, he met Cardinal Ugolino di Conti, who later became Pope Gregory IX. The latter introduced him to Dominic de Guzmán, whose ideals on poverty fascinated him. During his stay in Rome, he fell seriously ill, Dominic visited him and prayed for him. Reginald promised him that if he recovered, he would enter the Dominican order.

While he was ill, the Virgin Mary is said to have appeared to Reginald, presenting him with the white Dominican habit and inviting him to wear it. Reginald was cured and took his religious vows before Dominic, who asked him to follow him to Bologna. At the University of Bologna, many students and professors were deeply impressed by Reginald's preaching, including Maestro Moneta and Roland of Cremona, who rushed to the friars on an Ash Wednesday to ask them to enter the Dominican order.

A young noblewoman from Bologna, Diana degli Andalò, who had become friends with Reginald, donated the church of San Niccolò delle Vigne (now the Basilica of San Domenico) and its large adjoining plot of land to the Dominican friars so that they could build a convent there. She took Dominican vows and later became prioress of the convent of Sant'Agnese in Bologna, which Dominic and Reginald blessed.

Reginald remained in Bologna for almost a year as prior of the Dominican convent, while Dominic was in Spain and France. On his return, he sent Reginald to Paris, where the Order needed his presence. In Paris, Reginald became prior of the Dominican convent of Saint-Jacques and, with his sermons, he enthused many professors at the Sorbonne as well as many students, among whom were Jordan of Saxony, who would be Dominic's successor in the Order.

Despite his health problems, Reginald wanted to continue to lead an austere lifestyle, marked by continuous penances, which he considered a pleasure, he said: "One cannot follow Jesus without a cross! I do not think I acquired any particular merit by entering the Order, because I have always been very happy there". The second master of the Dominican order, Jordan of Saxony, said of him: "His eloquence was fiery and his words, like a flaming torch, inflamed the hearts of his listeners, very few had hearts hardened to the point of resisting the heat of this fire. One would have said he was a second Elijah".

He died in 1220. When he was dying, he was heard to say: "It has been no merit for me to be a Dominican because I have enjoyed it so much!" As the Dominicans did not yet have a cemetery in Paris, Reginald was buried in the Benedictine cemetery of Sainte-Marie-des-Champs, Seine-Maritime. Today, an altar exists in the crypt of Notre-Dame-des-Champs on rue Pierre-Nicole where it is written that "for centuries the Parisians came to honor him and pray to him in this sanctuary".

== Veneration ==
Reginald was beatified on 15 February 1877 by Pope Pius IX.
