= William of Montferrat (monk) =

13th-century monk

William of Montferrat (in Italian, Guglielmo di Monferrato) was probably a member of the family of the marquesses of Montferrat.

As a young man, staying in the house of Ugolino di Conti while observing Lent in Rome in 1215 or 1216, he encountered Dominic of Osma. They discussed Christian ministry, and talked of future missionary work among Prussians or other northern pagans. William afterwards spent two years at the University of Paris. In June 1219 Dominic came to Paris and enrolled William in the Order of Friars Preachers. Leaving Paris in July, Dominic and William travelled with a third Friar, known only as John (Iohannes), to Milan and Bologna. Leaving John there, they went on to Florence and Viterbo, where they found Pope Honorius III. William now remained with the pope and gained his close trust, but was at Bologna in summer 1221 when Dominic died. He was one of the witnesses at the process of Dominic's canonisation at Bologna in 1233.

== Bibliography ==
- M.-H. Vicaire, Saint Dominic and his times; translated by Kathleen Pond. London: Darton, Longman and Todd, 1964.
