= Cecilia Cesarini =

Italian Dominican nun (1203–1290)

Blessed Cecilia Cesarini O.P.
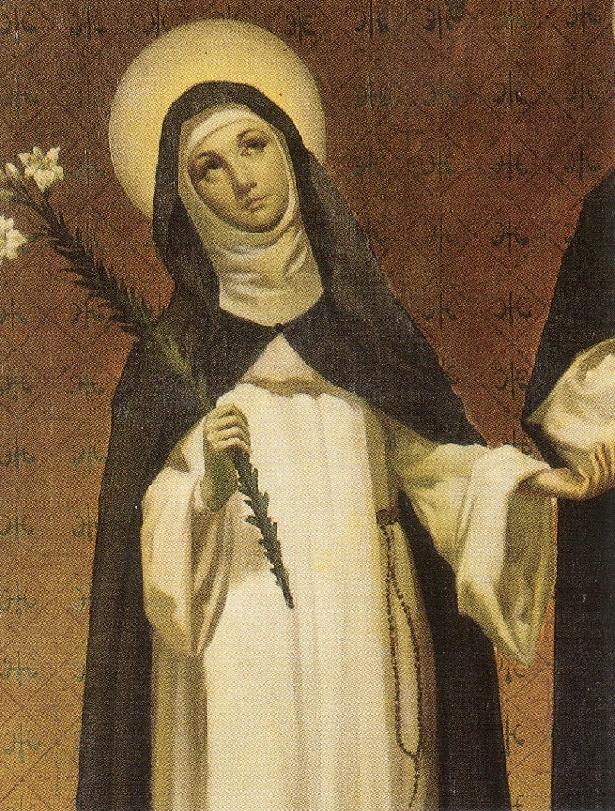

Nun
- Born: 1203
- Died: 1290 (aged about 87); Bologna, Italy
- Venerated in: Roman Catholic Church
- Beatified: 24 December 1891, Saint Peter's Basilica, Papal States by Pope Leo XIII
- Major shrine: Convent of Saint Agnes, Bologna
- Feast: August 4
- Attributes: lily

...Blessed Diana d'Andalò and the other two members of the community who were beatified with her personify the three essential graces of monastic life: Amata, deep humility, Cecilia, the prioress, wise and creative authority; Diana, the greatest grace of them all, perfect love.

— Gerald Vann, O.P.

Cecilia Cesarini (1203–1290), also Caecilia, was a Dominican nun. Cecilia, described as "a high-spirited young Roman", was born into the Cesarini family, a well-established family of the minor nobility. The reason she entered into a religious life is unknown.

As part of Dominic's reform of monastic life in the 13th century, when Cecilia was 17 years old, her monastery, Santa Maria in Rome, was moved to San Sisto Vecchio, under the Dominican order. She knew Dominic personally. She used her family's influence to assist his reforms, urged her prioress to support his cause, and according to tradition, was the first to receive the Dominican habit. Two years later, in 1223 or 1224, she and three other nuns, including Diana degli Andalò and Amata, were sent to Bologna to found a new monastery, St. Agnes, where she remained until her death. She was the monastery's first prioress, and was reported to be "very strict".

In her late 80s, almost 50 years after Dominic's death, Cecilia was asked by Theodore of Apoldia to record her memories about the early days of the Dominican movement. She dictated to another nun her memories of Dominic, including his physical description, several of his miracles, and a spiritual depiction about his "deep trust and confidence in God". Her account was the "only first-hand description" of Dominic.

Cecilia died in 1290. She was buried at St. Agnes with Andalò and Amata; the three are always associated together. Their relics were transferred several times but always together. They were beatified in 1891. Her feast day is, depending on the source, is August 4.

== Bibliography ==
"The Legend of St. Dominic", by Blessed Cecilia Cesarini. Part III of Lives of the Brethren of the Order of Preachers 1206-1259 (1955). Translated by Placid Conway, O.P. Bede Jarrett, O.P. (ed.) London: Blackfriars Publications.
