= Jordan of Saxony =

Beatified German Dominican priest

Blessed Jordan of Saxony OP
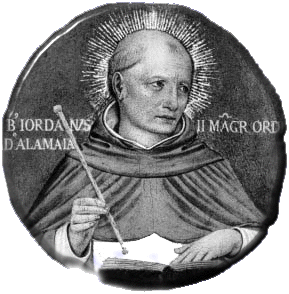
- Fresco of the Blessed Jordan in the Dominican priory at Worms

Master General of the Order of Preachers
- Born: c. 1190; Borgberge near Dassel, Duchy of Saxony, Holy Roman Empire
- Died: 1237; Levantine Sea, near Acre
- Venerated in: Roman Catholic Church
- Beatified: 10 May 1826, Saint Peter's Basilica, Papal States by Pope Leo XII (cultus confirmed)
- Feast: 13 February
- Patronage: Vocations to the Dominican Order; Faculty of Engineering; University of Santo Tomas; Manila, Philippines

Academic background
- Education: University of Paris
- Academic advisor: Reginald of Orleans

Academic work
- Institutions: University of Paris

Jordan of Saxony (referred to in Latin as Jordanis, also known as de Alamania; c. 1190 – 1237), was a German Catholic priest and one of the first leaders of the Dominican Order. His feast day is February 13.

== Life ==
Jordan belonged to the noble German family of the Counts of Eberstein. He was born in the Castle of Borrenstrick, in the diocese of Paderborn. He began his studies in his native land, and was sent to complete them at the University of Paris. While a student he met Dominic de Guzman, the founder of the Order of Preachers, and was inspired by the preaching of Reginald of Orleans (also known as Reginald of Saint-Gilles) to join the Dominican Order. He received the habit on Ash Wednesday, 1220. Jordan was a Master of Arts and a grammarian, and taught in the schools of Paris.

In 1221, a General Chapter of the Order held in Bologna appointed Jordan Prior Provincial of Lombardy in Italy.

=== Master General ===
On 6 August 1221, Dominic died, and in 1222 Jordan was elected as his successor as Master General of the Order of Preachers. Like Dominic, Jordan was famed as a strict disciplinarian whose commitment to the Rule was tempered with kindness.

During Jordan's administration, the young Order increased to over 300 priories. Jordan is particularly remembered for his eloquence in attracting candidates to join the Order. Through his lectures in university towns, he won many—allegedly well over 1,000—professors and students for the Order from the universities of Europe, among whom was Albertus Magnus who is thought to have been recruited in Padua. He added four new provinces to the eight already existing. Twice he obtained for the Order a chair at the University of Paris and helped to found the University of Toulouse. He established the first general house of studies of the Order.

In addition, Jordan was a spiritual guide to many, including one of the first Dominican nuns, Diana degli Andalò. He also found time to write a number of books: a life of Dominic and several other works. Among them was the Libellus de principiis Ordinis Praedicatorum ("Booklet on the beginnings of the Order of Preachers"), a Latin text. This is both the earliest biography of Dominic and the first narrative history of the foundation of the Order.

A section of a work by the friar Gerald de Frachet describing the lives of the first Dominicans, the Lives of the Brothers (Vitae fratrum), is dedicated to describing his character, virtue, and miracles. All of the first chroniclers of the Order describe Jordan's kindness and personal charm. He had the ability to console the troubled and to inspire the despondent with new hope.

== Death ==
Jordan died, at the age of forty-seven, in a shipwreck returning from Palestine, where he had been visiting the local monasteries of the Order. The shipwreck occurred off the coast of Syria on 13 February 1237. Jordan was buried in the Dominican Church of St. John in Akko, in present-day Israel.

His feast day is 13 February.

== Veneration ==
Jordan of Saxony was beatified by Pope Leo XII in 1825.

=== Patronage ===
He is venerated as the patron of Dominican vocations. Jordan is honoured as the patron saint of the Faculty of Engineering of the University of Santo Tomas, in Manila, which was founded by the Dominican Order. In Colombia, he is honoured as the patron saint of the Colegio Jordan de Sajonia, one of the most important private schools of Bogota.

== Legacy ==
Jordan of Saxony is credited with introducing the practice of singing the Salve Regina in procession at the end of Compline, done, it is recorded, to calm the spirits of the Brothers, who were being tried by the Devil.

Catholic Church titles
Preceded by Dominic de Guzman	Master General of the Dominican Order; 1222–1237	Succeeded by Raymundo de Peñafort
