= Caleruega =

- Municipality and town
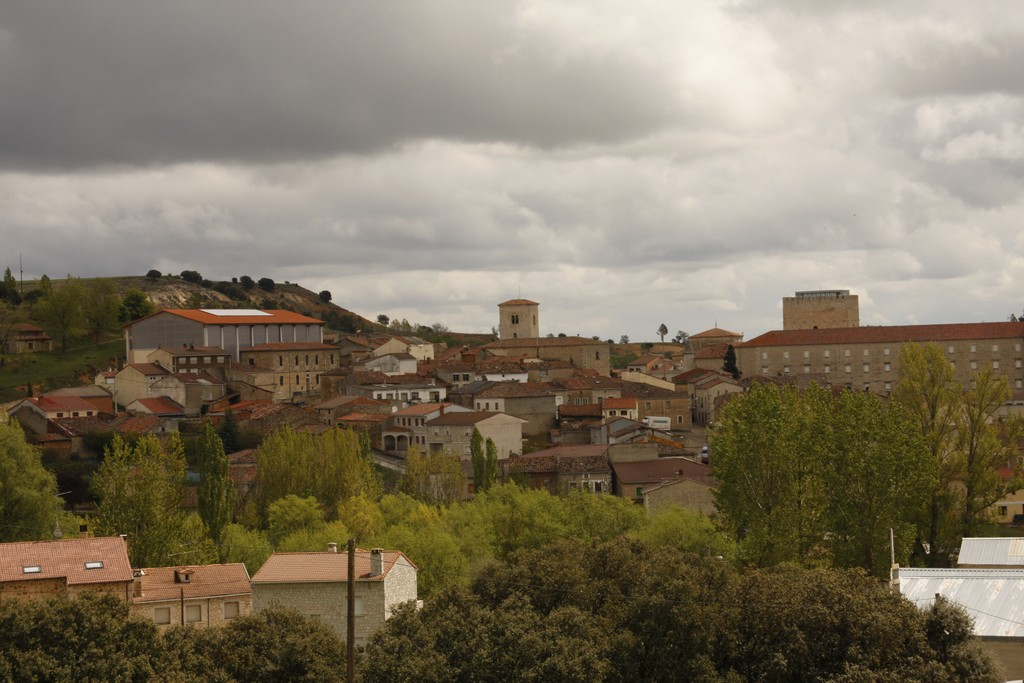
- View of Caleruega, 2010

- Flag Coat of arms

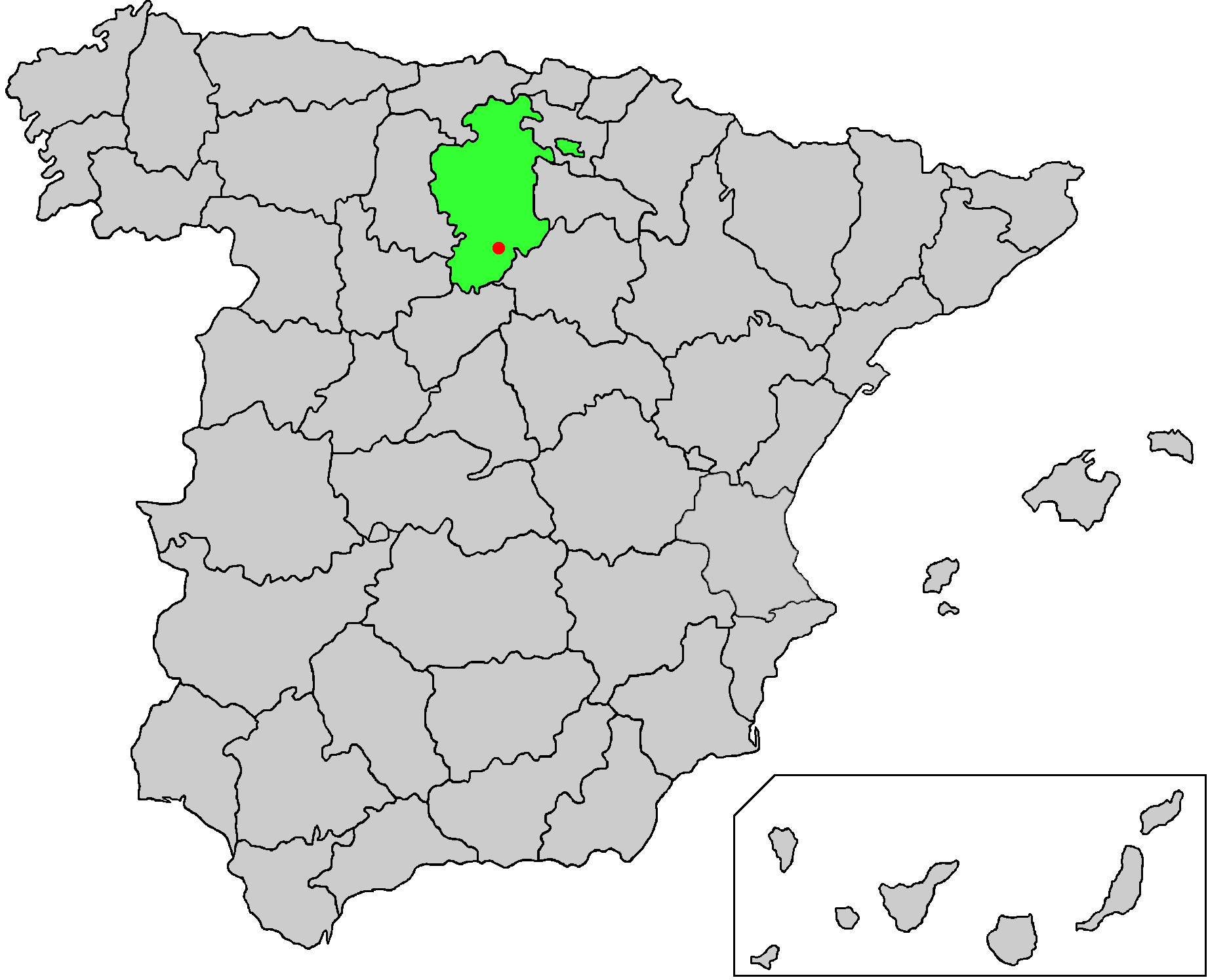
- Location of Caleruega
- Coordinates: 41°49′N 3°29′W
- Country: Spain
- Autonomous community: Castile and León
- Province: Burgos
- Comarca: Ribera del Duero

Government
  - Mayor: José Ignacio Delgado (PRCAL)

Area
  - Total: 47.63 km^{2} (18.39 sq mi)
- Elevation: 960 m (3,150 ft)

Population (2025-01-01)
  - Total: 385
  - Density: 8.08/km^{2} (20.9/sq mi)
- Time zone: UTC+1 (CET)
  - Summer (DST): UTC+2 (CEST)
- Postal code: 09451
- Website: http://www.caleruega.es/

Caleruega is a small town and municipality located in the autonomous community of Castile-Leon, Spain. It is part of the province of Burgos. The town is a few miles south of the Monastery of Santo Domingo de Silos.

== People from Caleruega ==
- Saint Dominic (1170–1221) - Catholic church priest and founder of the Dominican Order
