= Dominic de Guzmán =

Founder of the Dominican Order (1170–1221)

Saint Dominic OP
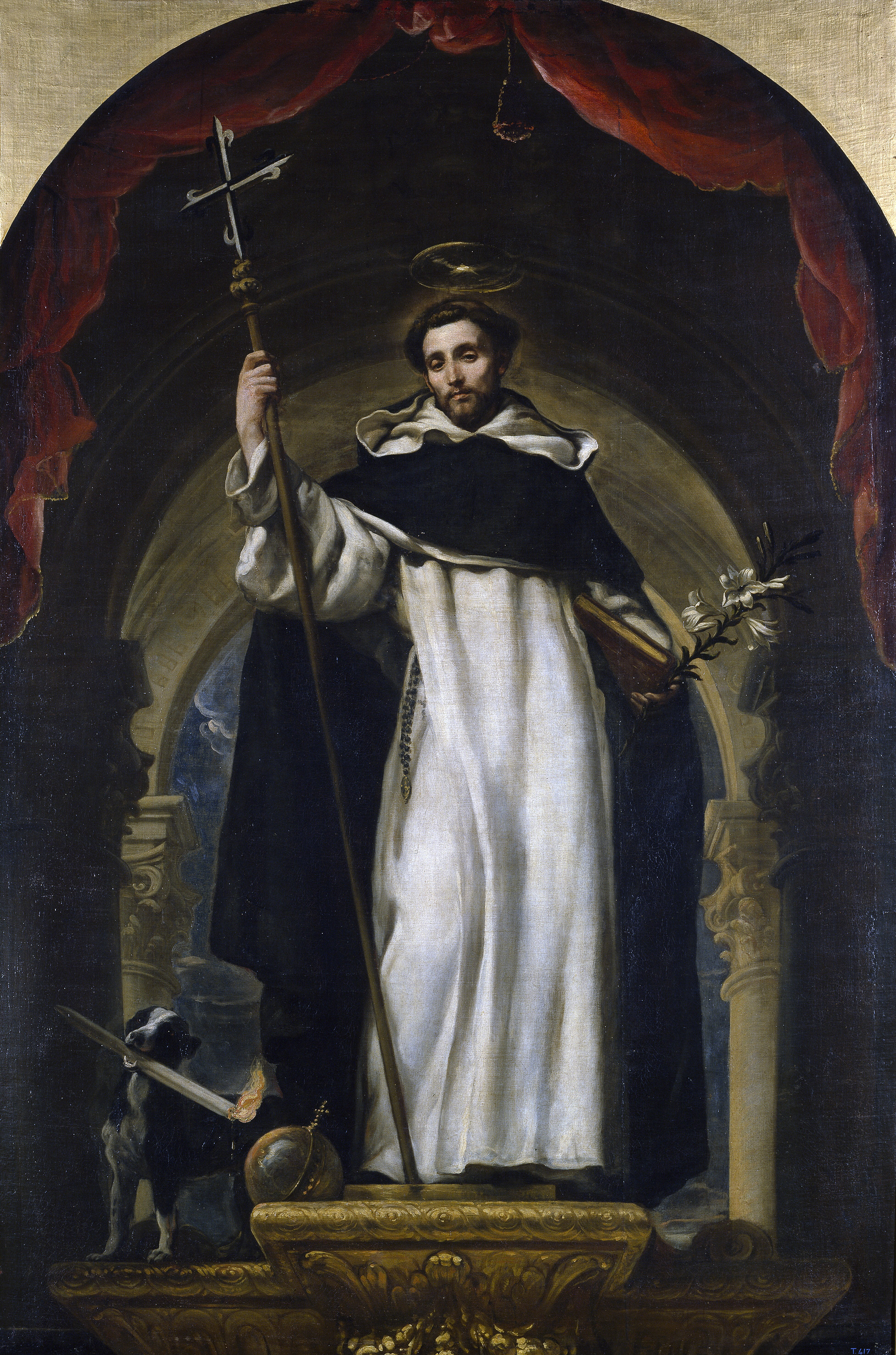
- Santo Domingo de Guzmán, portrait by the Portuguese-Spanish painter Claudio Coello in 1670

Founder of the Dominican Order; Confessor of the Faith
- Born: 8 August 1170; Caleruega, Kingdom of Castile
- Died: 6 August 1221 (aged 50); Bologna, Kingdom of Italy, Holy Roman Empire
- Venerated in: Catholic Church; Anglican Communion; Lutheranism
- Canonized: 3 July 1234, Rieti Cathedral by Pope Gregory IX
- Major shrine: Basilica of San Domenico
- Feast: 8 August; 24 May (translation of relics); 4 August (pre-1970 General Roman Calendar)
- Attributes: Dominican habit and rule, rosary, dog (often black and white) with a torch in its mouth, star above his head, lilies, staff
- Patronage: Astronomers, natural scientists, Archdiocese of Fuzhou, Dominican Republic, Santo Domingo Pueblo, Valletta, Birgu (Malta), Campana, Calabria, Managua

Dominic de Guzmán (Spanish: [ɡuθˈman]; 8 August 1170 – 6 August 1221), almost exclusively known as Saint Dominic (Spanish: Santo Domingo), was a Castilian religious priest and the founder of the Order of Preachers (Dominicans). He is the patron saint of astronomers and natural scientists, and he and the Dominicans are traditionally credited with spreading and popularizing the rosary.

== Life ==
=== Birth and early life ===
Dominic was born in Caleruega, halfway between Osma and Aranda de Duero in Old Castile, Spain. He was named after Dominic of Silos. The Benedictine abbey of Santo Domingo de Silos lies a few miles north of Caleruega.

In the earliest narrative source, by Jordan of Saxony, Dominic's parents are not named. The story is told that before his birth his barren mother made a pilgrimage to the Abbey at Silos, and dreamt that a dog leapt from her womb carrying a flaming torch in its mouth, and seemed to set the earth on fire. This story is likely to have emerged when his order became known, after his name, as the Dominican order, Dominicanus in Latin, and a play on words interpreted as Domini canis: "Dog of the Lord." Jordan adds that Dominic was brought up by his parents and a maternal uncle who was an archpriest. The failure to name his parents is not unusual, since Jordan wrote a history of the Order's early years, rather than a biography of Dominic. A later source of the 13th century gives their names as Juana and Felix. Nearly a century after Dominic's birth, the local author Rodrigo de Cerrato asserted that Dominic's father was an honored and wealthy man in his village. The travel narrative of Pero Tafur, written circa 1439 (about a pilgrimage to Dominic's tomb in Italy), states that Dominic's father belonged to the family de Guzmán, and that his mother belonged to the Aça or Aza family. Dominic's mother, Joan of Aza, was beatified by Pope Leo XII in 1829. His older brother, Manés was also beatified by Pope Gregory XVI in 1834.

=== Education and early career ===
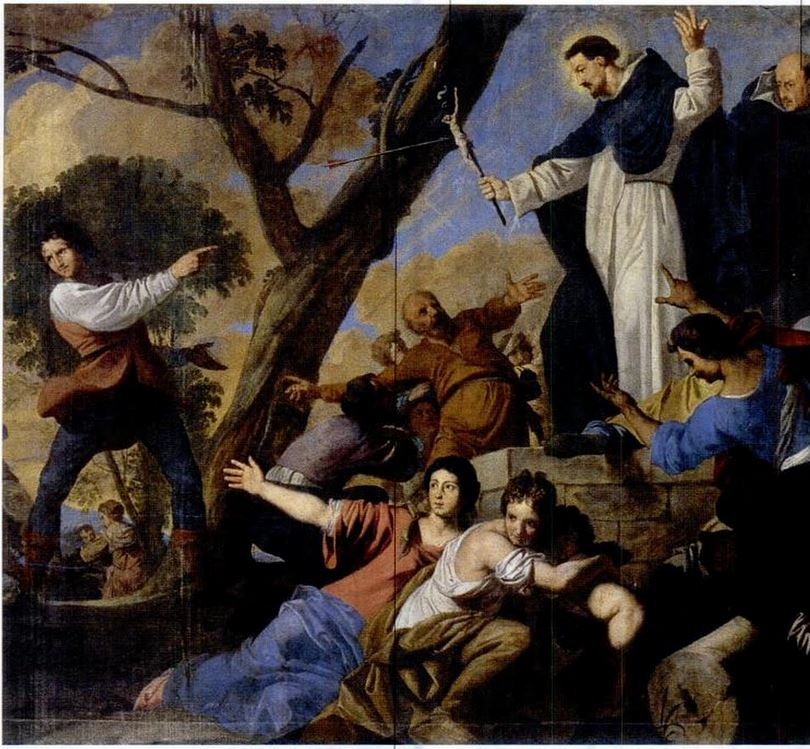
A picture of St Dominic accompanied by Simon de Montfort raising the crucifix against the Cathars by Daniel van den Dyck

At fourteen years of age, Dominic was sent to the Premonstratensian monastery of Santa María de La Vid and subsequently transferred for further studies in the schools of Palencia. In Palencia, he devoted six years to the arts and four to theology. At some point in time he also joined Santa María de La Vid.

In 1191, when Spain was desolated by famine, young Dominic gave away his money and sold his clothes, furniture, and even precious manuscripts to feed the hungry. Dominic reportedly told his astonished fellow students, "Would you have me study off these dead skins when men are dying of hunger?"

At the age of 24, Dominic was ordained as a priest and joined the canonry of the Cathedral of Osma. In 1198, Don Martin de Bazan, the Bishop of Osma, having reformed the chapter, made Dominic the subprior of the chapter.

Diego de Acebo succeeded Bazan as Bishop of Osma in 1201. In 1203 or 1204, Dominic accompanied Diego on a diplomatic mission for Alfonso VIII, King of Castile, to secure a bride in Denmark for crown prince Ferdinand. The envoys traveled to Denmark via Aragon and the south of France. The marriage negotiations ended successfully, but the princess died before leaving for Castile. During their return journey, they met with Cistercian monks who had been sent by Pope Innocent III to preach against the Cathars, a religious sect with gnostic and dualistic beliefs which the Catholic Church deemed heretical. Dominic and Diego de Acebo attributed the Cistercians' lack of success to their extravagance and pomp compared to the asceticism of the Cathars. Dominic and Diego decided to adopt a more ascetic way of life and began a program in the south of France to convert the Cathars.

=== Prouille ===
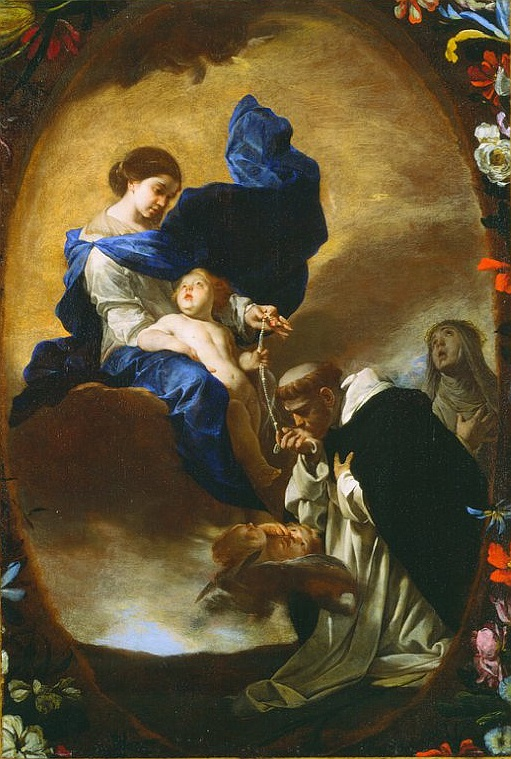
The vision of St. Dominic receiving the rosary from the Virgin by Bernardo Cavallino

In late 1206, Acebo and his group established themselves at the Monastery of Our Lady of Prouille in France. Bishop Foulques of Toulouse allowed them to use the church. The house was intended partly as a refuge for women who had previously lived in Cathar religious houses, and partly the first established base of operations. The first nuns of Prouille lived for several months at Fanjeaux, because the buildings at Prouille were not yet habitable. Dominic gave them the Rule of St. Augustine.

Catholic-Cathar debates were held at Verfeil, Pamiers and Montréal. Ordered by the Pope to return to his diocese, Diego de Acebo died at Osma in December 1207, leaving Dominic alone in his mission.

==== The vision of Mary and the rosary ====
Based on a Dominican tradition, in 1208 Dominic experienced a vision of the Blessed Virgin Mary in the church at Prouille, during which she gave him a rosary. This gave rise to the title Our Lady of the Rosary. The prayer beads were well-known at the time; it was not the beginning of rosary devotion, but Dominicans contributed much to its spread. For centuries the rosary has been at the heart of the Dominican Order. Pope Pius XI stated, that the rosary is "the principle and foundation on which the Order of St. Dominic rests for perfecting the lives of its members and obtaining the salvation of others."

=== Foundation of the Dominicans ===
In 1215, Dominic with six followers moved into a house given them by Peter Seila of Toulouse. Dominic saw the need for a new type of organization to address the spiritual needs of the growing cities of the era, one that would combine dedication and systematic education, with more organizational flexibility than either monastic orders or the secular clergy. He subjected himself and his companions to the monastic rules of prayer and penance; Bishop Foulques of Toulouse gave them written authority to preach throughout his territory.

Also in 1215, the year of the Fourth Lateran Council, Dominic and Foulques went to Rome to secure the approval of Pope Innocent III. Dominic returned to Rome a year later and was finally granted written authority in December 1216 by the new pope, Honorius III, for him to form the Ordo Praedicatorum ("Order of Preachers").

In the winter of 1216–1217, at the house of Ugolino de' Conti, Dominic first met William of Montferrat, who joined Dominic as a friar in the Order of Preachers and remained a close friend.

=== Later life ===
Cecilia Cesarini, who was received by Dominic into his new order, in her old age described him as "...thin and of middle height. His face was handsome and somewhat fair. He had reddish hair and beard and beautiful eyes ... His hands were long and fine and his voice pleasingly resonant. He never got bald, though he wore the full tonsure, which was mingled with a few grey hairs."

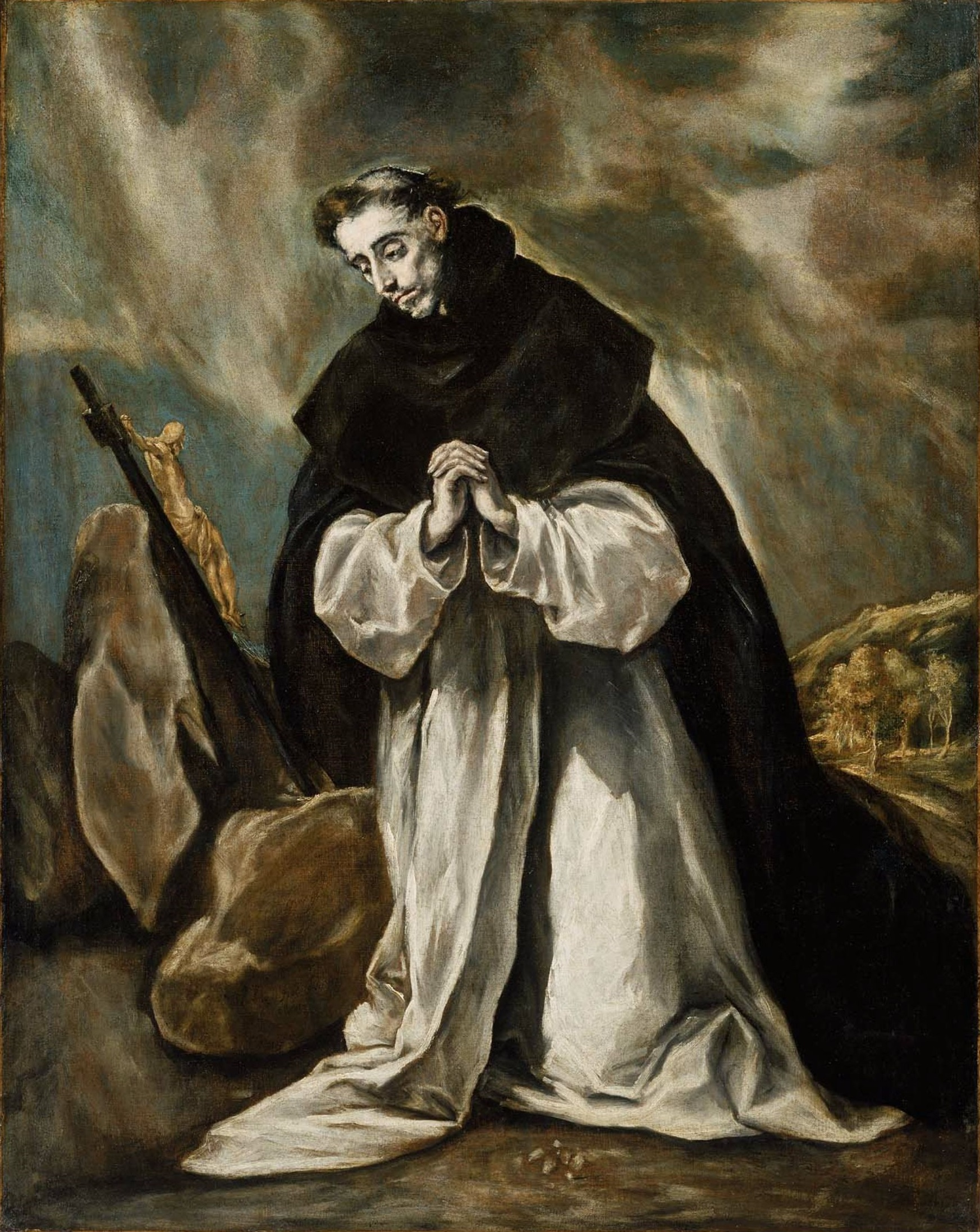
Saint Dominic in prayer by El Greco

Although he traveled extensively to maintain contact with his growing brotherhood of friars, Dominic made his headquarters in Rome. In 1219, Pope Honorius III invited Dominic and his companions to take up residence at the ancient Roman basilica of Santa Sabina, which they did by early 1220. Before that time the friars had a temporary residence in Rome at the convent of San Sisto Vecchio, which Honorius III had given to Dominic circa 1218, intending it to become a convent for a reformation of nuns at Rome under Dominic's guidance. The official foundation of the Dominican convent at Santa Sabina with its studium conventuale, the first Dominican studium in Rome, occurred with the legal transfer of property from Pope Honorius III to the Order of Preachers on 5 June 1222, though the brethren had taken up residence there already in 1220. The studium at Santa Sabina was the forerunner of the studium generale at Santa Maria sopra Minerva. The latter would be transformed in the 16th century into the College of Saint Thomas (Latin: Collegium Divi Thomæ), and then in the 20th century into the Pontifical University of Saint Thomas Aquinas, Angelicum sited at the convent of Saints Dominic and Sixtus.

Dominic arrived in Bologna on 21 December 1218. A convent was established at the Mascarella church by Reginald of Orleans. Soon afterward they had to move to the church of San Nicolò of the Vineyards. Dominic settled in this church and held the first two General Chapters of the order there.

According to Guiraud, Dominic abstained from meat, "observed stated fasts and periods of silence", "selected the worst accommodations and the meanest clothes", and "never allowed himself the luxury of a bed". "When traveling, he beguiled the journey with spiritual instruction and prayers". Guiraud also states that Dominic frequently traveled barefoot and that "rain and other discomforts elicited from his lips nothing but praises to God".

Dominic died at the age of fifty-one, according to Guiraud "exhausted with the austerities and labors of his career". He had reached the convent of St Nicholas at Bologna, Italy, "weary and sick with a fever". Guiraud states that Dominic "made the monks lay him on some sacking stretched upon the ground" and that "the brief time that remained to him was spent in exhorting his followers to have charity, to guard their humility, and to make their treasure out of poverty". He died at noon on 6 August 1221. His body was moved to a simple sarcophagus in 1233. Under the authority of Pope Gregory IX, Dominic was canonized in 1234. In 1267 Dominic's remains were moved to the shrine, made by Nicola Pisano and his workshop for the Church of St. Dominic in Bologna.

== Inquisition ==
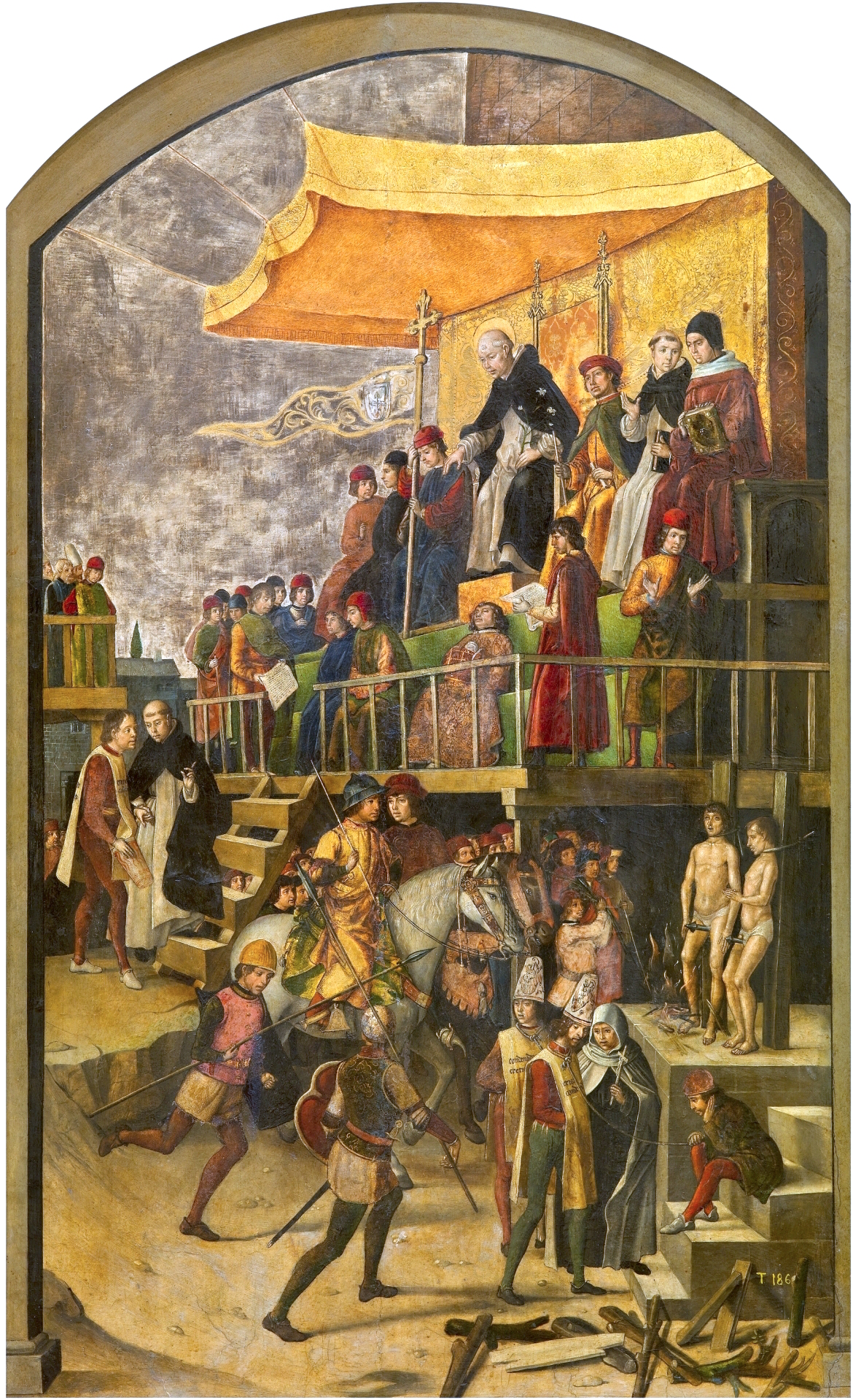
St Dominic presiding over an Auto da fe, by Pedro Berruguete, c. 1495

Dominic is commonly but apocryphally associated with the Inquisition. Historical sources from Dominic's own time period reveal nothing about his involvement in the Inquisition. Dominic died in 1221, and the office of the Inquisition was not established until 1231 in Lombardy and 1234 in Languedoc. The order he founded would, on the other hand, become closely associated with the medieval Inquisition.

Canon 27 of the Third Council of the Lateran of 1179 stressed the duty of princes to repress heresy and condemned "the Brabantians, Aragonese, Basques, Navarrese, and others who practice such cruelty toward Christians that they respect neither churches nor monasteries, spare neither widows nor orphans, neither age nor sex, but after the manner of pagans, destroy and lay waste everything". This was followed in 1184 by a decretal of Pope Lucius III, Ad abolendam. This decreed that bishops were to investigate the presence of heresy within their respective dioceses. Practices and procedures of episcopal inquisitions could vary from one diocese to another, depending on the resources available to individual bishops and their relative interest or disinterest.

In 1231 Pope Gregory IX appointed a number of Papal Inquisitors, mostly Dominicans and Franciscans, for the various regions of Europe. As mendicants, they were accustomed to travel. Unlike the haphazard episcopal methods, the papal inquisition was thorough and systematic, keeping detailed records. This tribunal or court functioned in France, Italy and parts of Germany and had virtually ceased operation by the early fourteenth century.

In the 15th century, the Spanish Inquisition commissioned the artist Pedro Berruguete to depict Dominic presiding at an auto da fé. Thus, the Spanish inquisitors promoted a historical legend for the sake of auto-justification. Reacting against the Spanish tribunals, 16th- and 17th-century Protestant polemicists developed and perpetuated the legend of Dominic the Inquisitor. This image gave German Protestant critics of the Catholic Church an argument against the Dominican Order whose preaching had proven to be a formidable opponent in the lands of the Reformation. As Edward Peters notes, "In Protestant historiography of the sixteenth century a kind of anti-cult of St. Dominic grew up."

== Cord of Saint Dominic ==
The Cord (belt) of Saint Dominic is a Catholic sacramental which reminds the wearer of the protection of Saint Dominic. The history of the cord is associated with the miraculous image of Saint Dominic in Soriano, the perimeter of which painting defines the length of the cord. The beginning of the prayer "O wonderful hope" is written on the cord. According to the tradition, if someone wishes to receive grace from Saint Dominic, they should wear it all the time. Infertile couples use the cord to pray for intercession of Saint Dominic for the gift of offspring from God.

== Veneration ==
The feast of Saint Dominic is celebrated with great pomp and devotion in Malta, in the old city of Birgu and the capital city of Valletta. Pope Pius V, a Dominican friar himself, aided the Knights of St. John to build Valletta.

The Arca di San Domenico is a shrine containing the remains of Saint Dominic, located in the Basilica of San Domenico in Bologna.

The Pattern of Urlaur is an annual festival held on 4 August at Urlaur, Kilmovee, County Mayo since medieval times, to commemorate the feast day of Saint Dominic.

The following dates are all feasts dedicated to Saint Dominic observed by Catholics depending on location and tradition:

- 25 January – commemoration of translation of relics to Church of Saint Roch
- 15 February – commemoration of the skull translation (1383)
- 24 May – commemoration of first translation (1233)
- 5 June – commemoration of second translation (1267)
- 3 July – commemoration of canonization anniversary (1234)
- 3 August – main commemoration (Australia)
- 4 August – commemoration by (Traditional Roman Catholics)
- 6 August – commemoration of death anniversary
- 7 August – main commemoration (Diocese of Sosnowiec, 8 August - anniversary of the dedication of cathedral church)
- 8 August – main commemoration
- 15 September – commemoration of apparition of Saint Dominic in Soriano (traditional date)
- 25 September – commemoration of apparition of Saint Dominic in Soriano (modern date)
- 11 November – commemoration of third translation (1411)

Dominic is honored in the Church of England and in the Episcopal Church on 8 August.

== Toponymy ==
The Dominican Republic and its capital Santo Domingo are named after Saint Dominic.

== Bibliography ==
- Bedouelle, Guy (1995). Saint Dominic: The Grace of the Word. Ignatius Press. ISBN 0-89870-531-2. An excerpt is available online: "The Holy Inquisition: Dominic and the Dominicans"
- Finn, Richard (2016). Dominic and the Order of Preachers. London: Catholic Truth Society. ISBN 9781784691011.
- Goergen, Donald J. (2016). Saint Dominic: The Story of a Preaching Friar. New York: The Paulist Press. ISBN 978-08091-4954-4.
- Guiraud, Jean (1913). Saint Dominic. Duckworth.
- Francis C. Lehner, ed., St Dominic: biographical documents. Washington: Thomist Press, 1964 Full text
- McGonigle, Thomas; Zagano, Phyllis (2006). The Dominican Tradition. Collegeville, MN: The Liturgical Press. ISBN 978-0-8146-1911-7.
- Pierre Mandonnet, M. H. Vicaire, St. Dominic and His Work. Saint Louis, 1948 Full text at Dominican Central
- Catholic Encyclopedia: St. Dominic by John B. O'Conner, 1909.
- Tugwell, Simon (1982). Early Dominicans: Selected Writings. New York: Paulist Press. ISBN 978-0-8091-2414-5.
- Vicaire, M.H. (1964). Saint Dominic and his Times. Translated by Kathleen Pond. Green Bay, Wisconsin: Alt Publishing. ASIN B0000CMEWR.
- Wishart, Alfred Wesley (1900). A Short History of Monks and Monasteries. Freely available eText. Project Gutenberg.
- Friedrich Wilhelm Bautz (1975). "Dominic de Guzmán". In Bautz, Friedrich Wilhelm (ed.). Biographisch-Bibliographisches Kirchenlexikon (BBKL) (in German). Vol. 1. Hamm: Bautz. cols. 1356–1358. ISBN 3-88309-013-1.
- Guy Bedouelle: Dominikus – Von der Kraft des Wortes. Styria, Graz/ Wien/ Köln 1984, ISBN 3-222-11513-3.
- Jean-René Bouchet: Dominikus: Gefährte der Verirrten. from the Franz. von Michael Marsch. publisher's current texts, Heiligenkreuztal, 1989, ISBN 3-921312-37-X.
- Peter Dyckhoff: Mit Leib und Seele beten. Illustrations and text of a mediaeval manuscript about the new form of prayer by Saint Dominic. ISBN 3-451-28231-3.
- Paul D. Hellmeier: Dominikus begegnen. St.Ulrich Verlag, Augsburg, 2007, ISBN 978-3-936484-92-2.
- Wolfram Hoyer (ed.): Jordan von Sachsen. Von den Anfängen des Predigerordens. (Dominikanische Quellen und Zeugnisse; Vol. 3). Benno, Leipzig, 2002, ISBN 3-7462-1574-9.
- Meinolf Lohrum: Dominikus. Benno, Leipzig, 1987, ISBN 3-7462-0047-4.
- Meinolf Lohrum: Dominikus. Beter und Prediger. M. Grünewald, Mainz, 1990, ISBN 3-7867-1136-4.
